= List of Sydney suburbs =

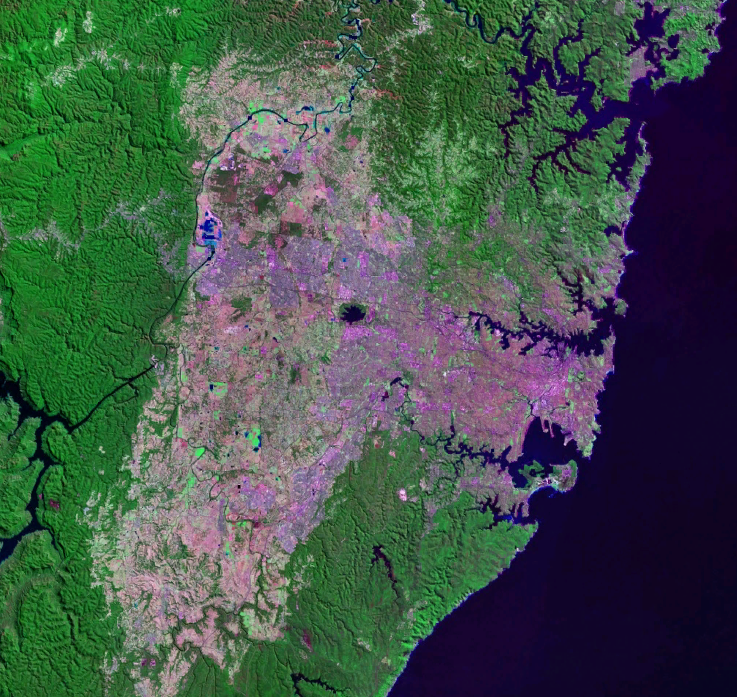
Landsat 7 false-color image of the Sydney area and surrounding suburbs. The image demonstrates how the built-up areas (pink) have been constrained by the Royal National Park to the south, the Ku-ring-gai Chase National Park to the north, and the Blue Mountains National Park to the west (a boundary that generally follows a geological feature called the Lapstone Monocline, dividing the Blue Mountains from the Cumberland Plain).

This is a complete listing of the suburbs and localities in the greater Sydney area in alphabetical order. Sydney has about 30 local government areas, each consisting of several suburbs. Suburbs in Australia are purely geographical, not political, divisions, but have officially defined boundaries. The term "suburban" is used for such defined districts throughout the metropolitan area, even in the city centre. See table below, Category: Suburbs of Sydney and Category: Local government areas in Sydney.

Suburbs are listed here if they are inside the Sydney metropolitan area, and are listed in the New South Wales Geographical Names Register as being suburbs. For this list, the boundaries of the Sydney metropolitan area are defined as the Hawkesbury/Nepean River in the north/north west, and then the outer boundaries of the City of Penrith, Camden Council, the City of Campbelltown and Sutherland Shire.

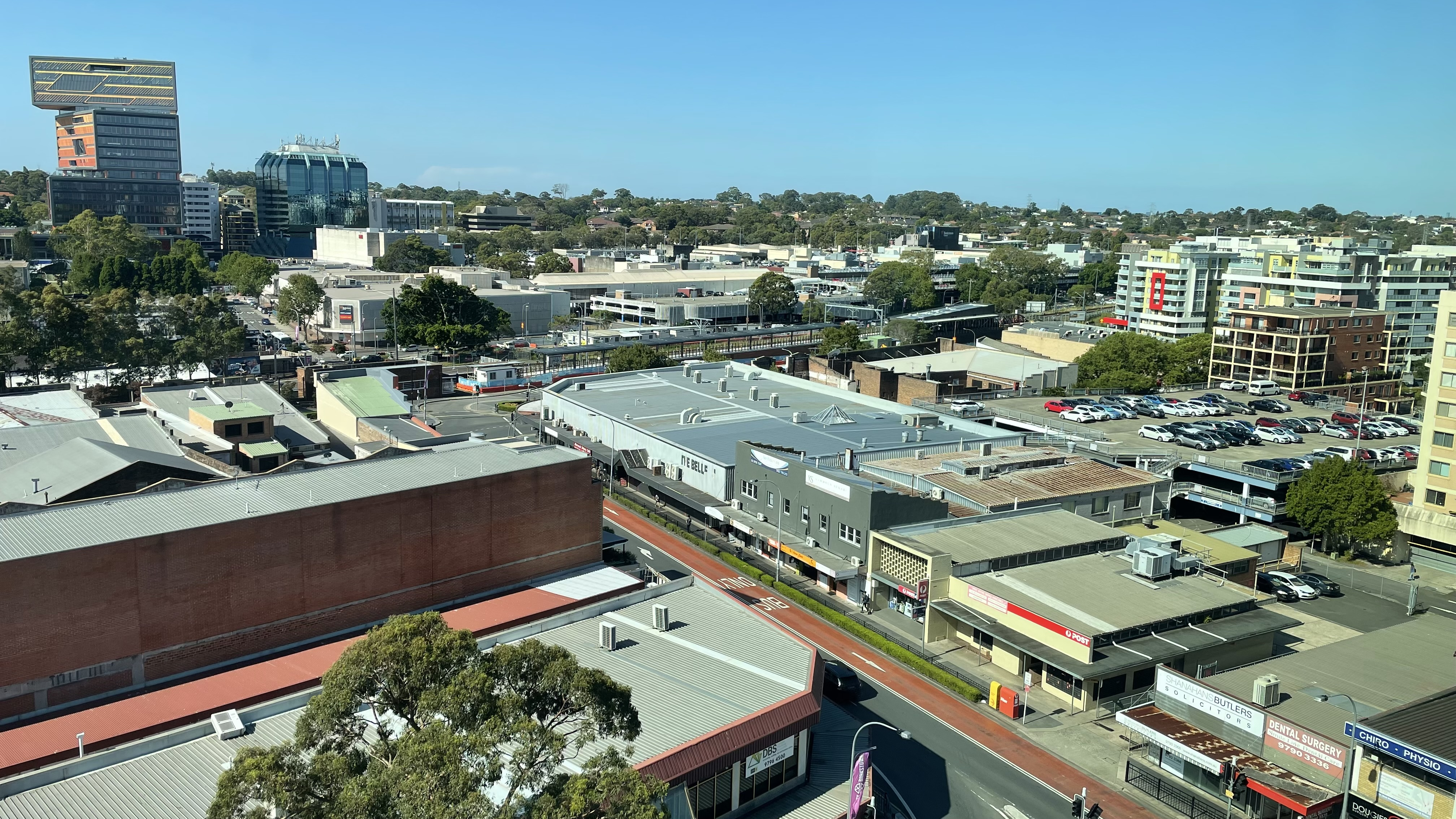
Bankstown

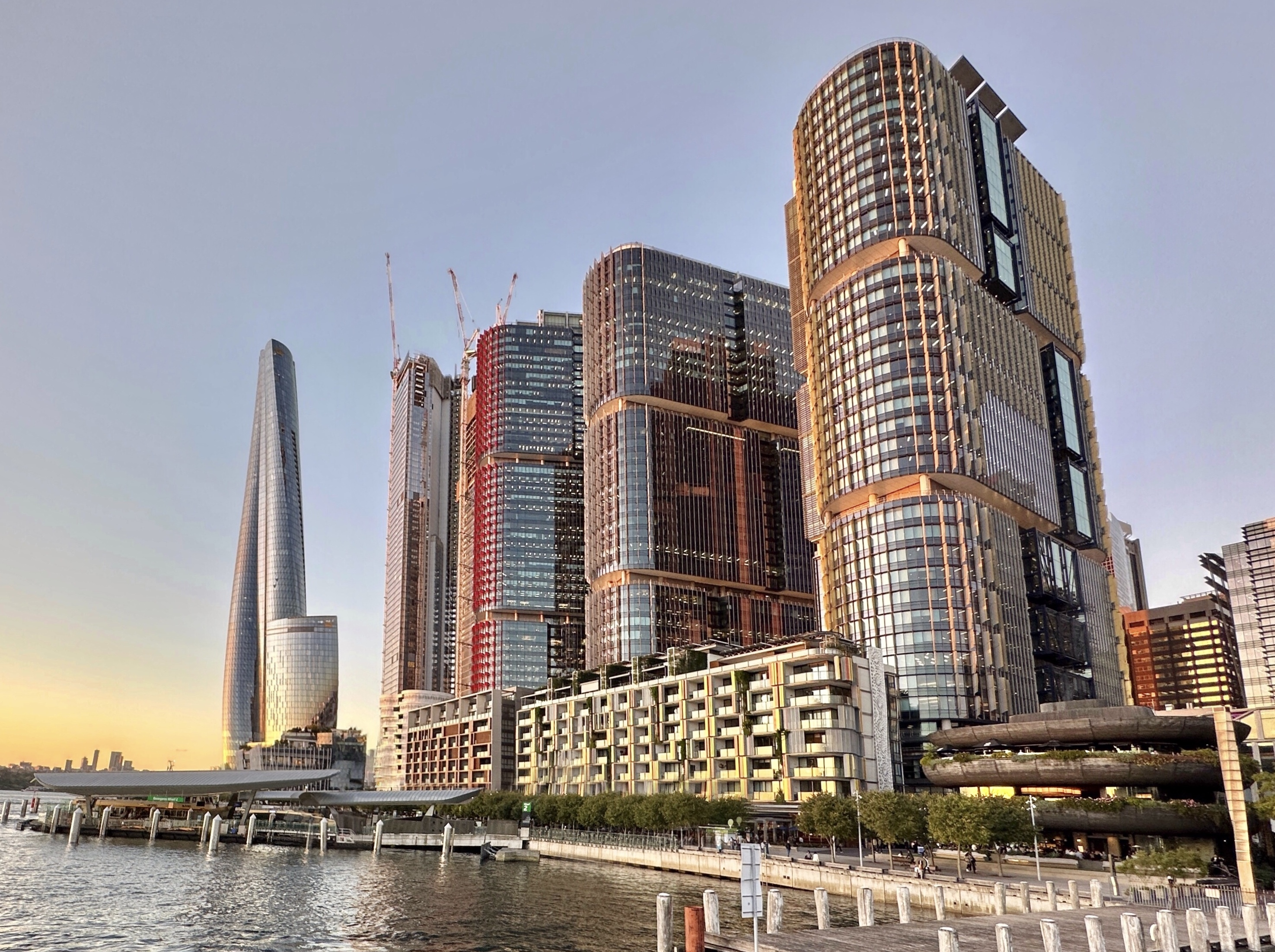
Barangaroo

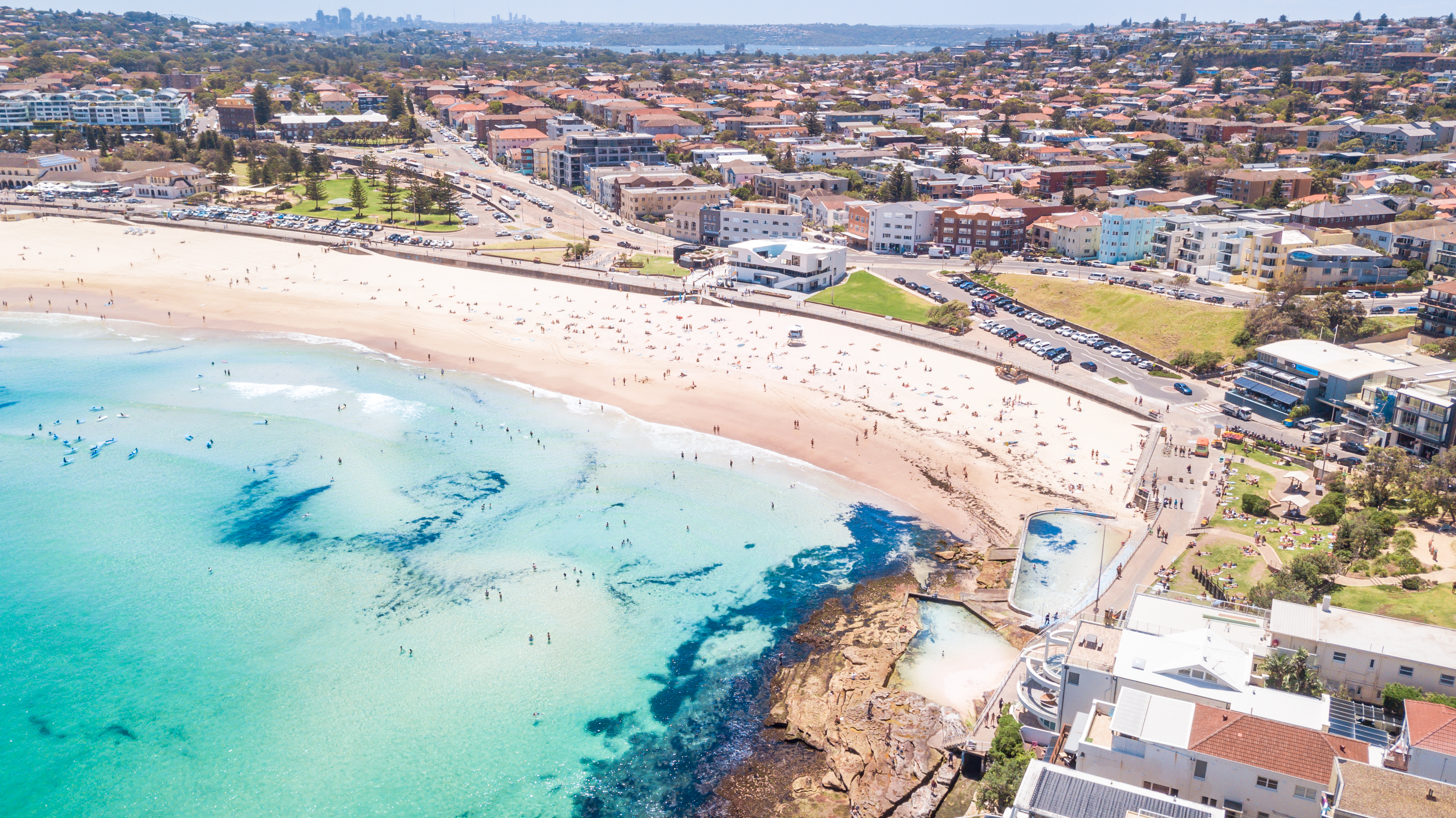
Bondi Beach

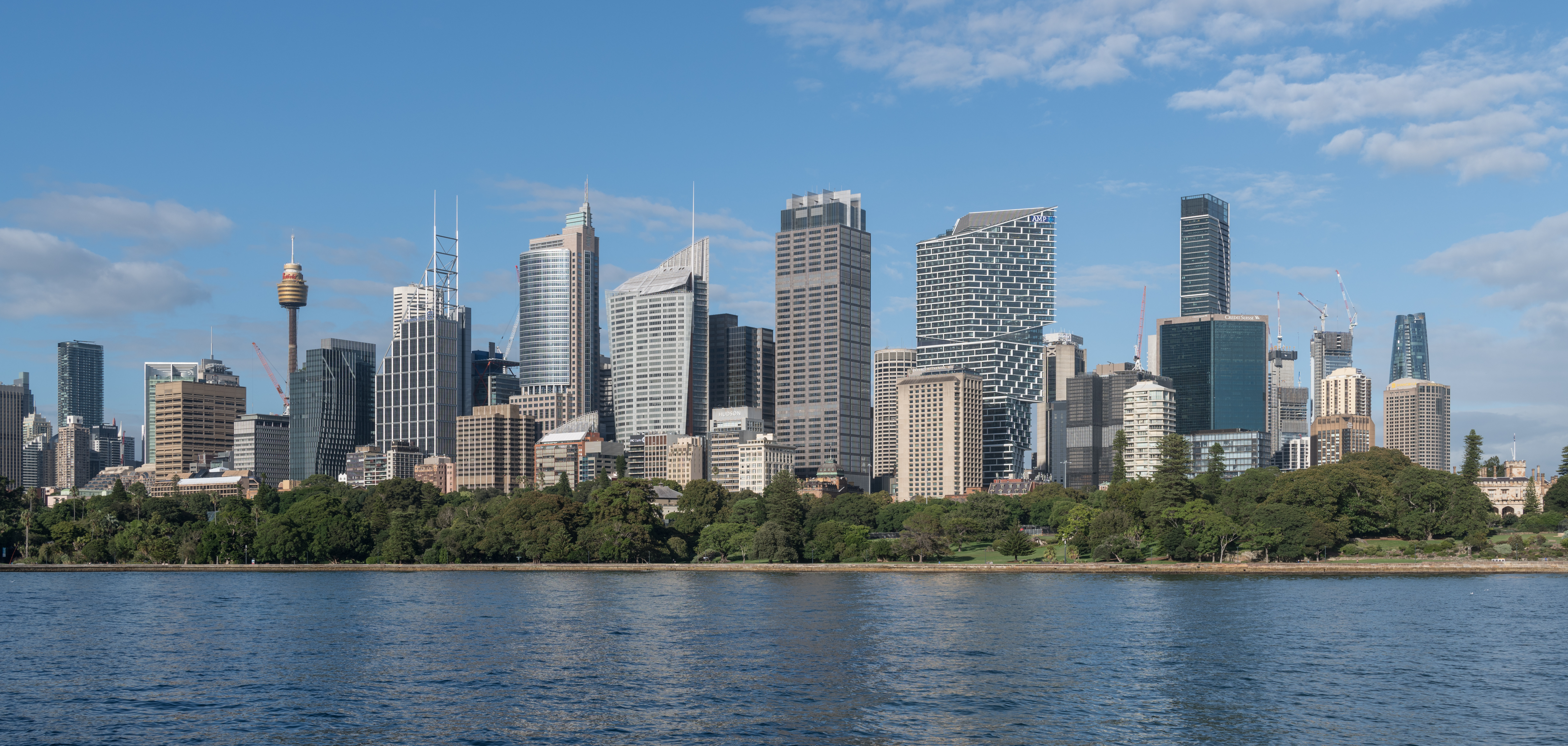
Central business district

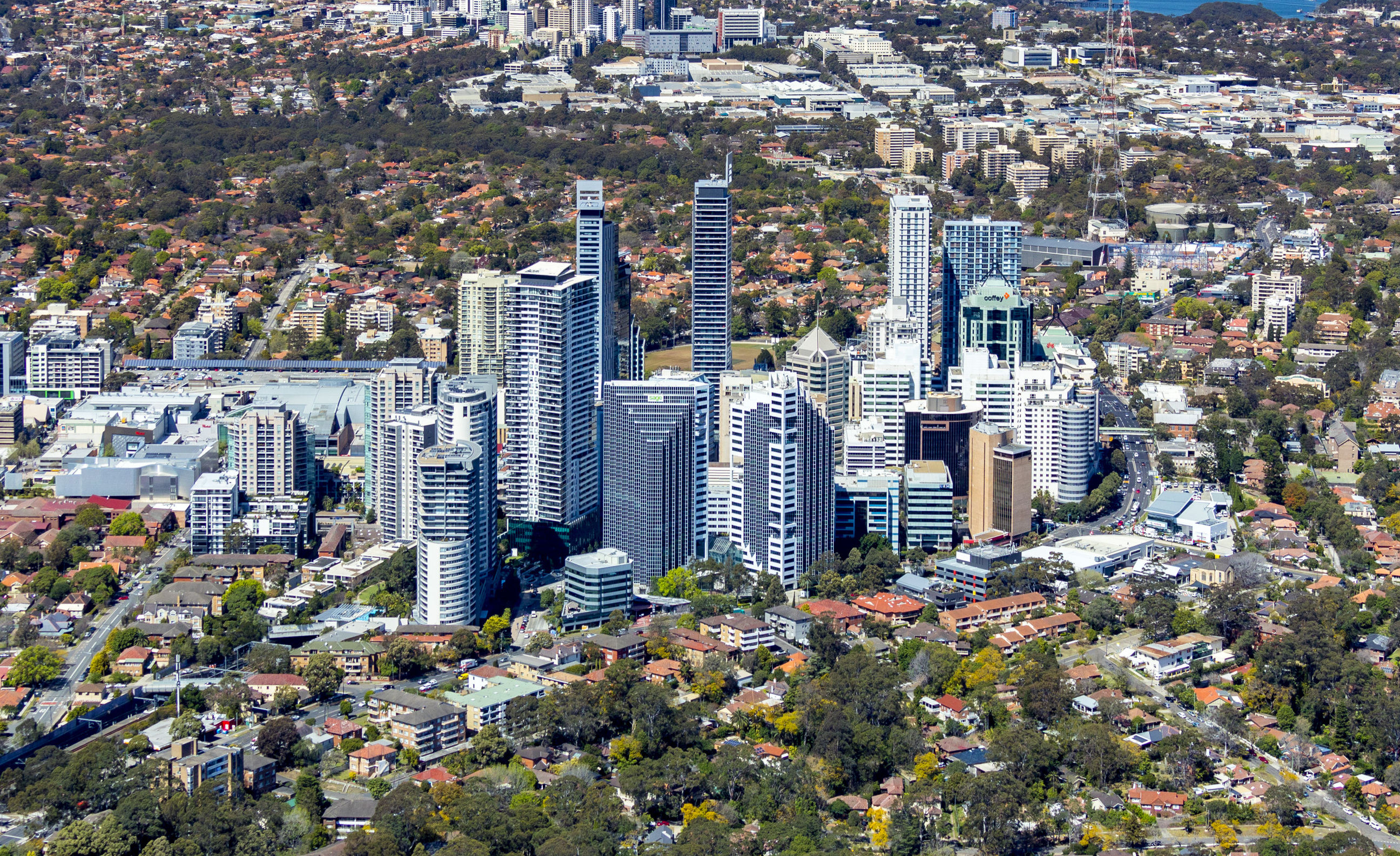
Chatswood

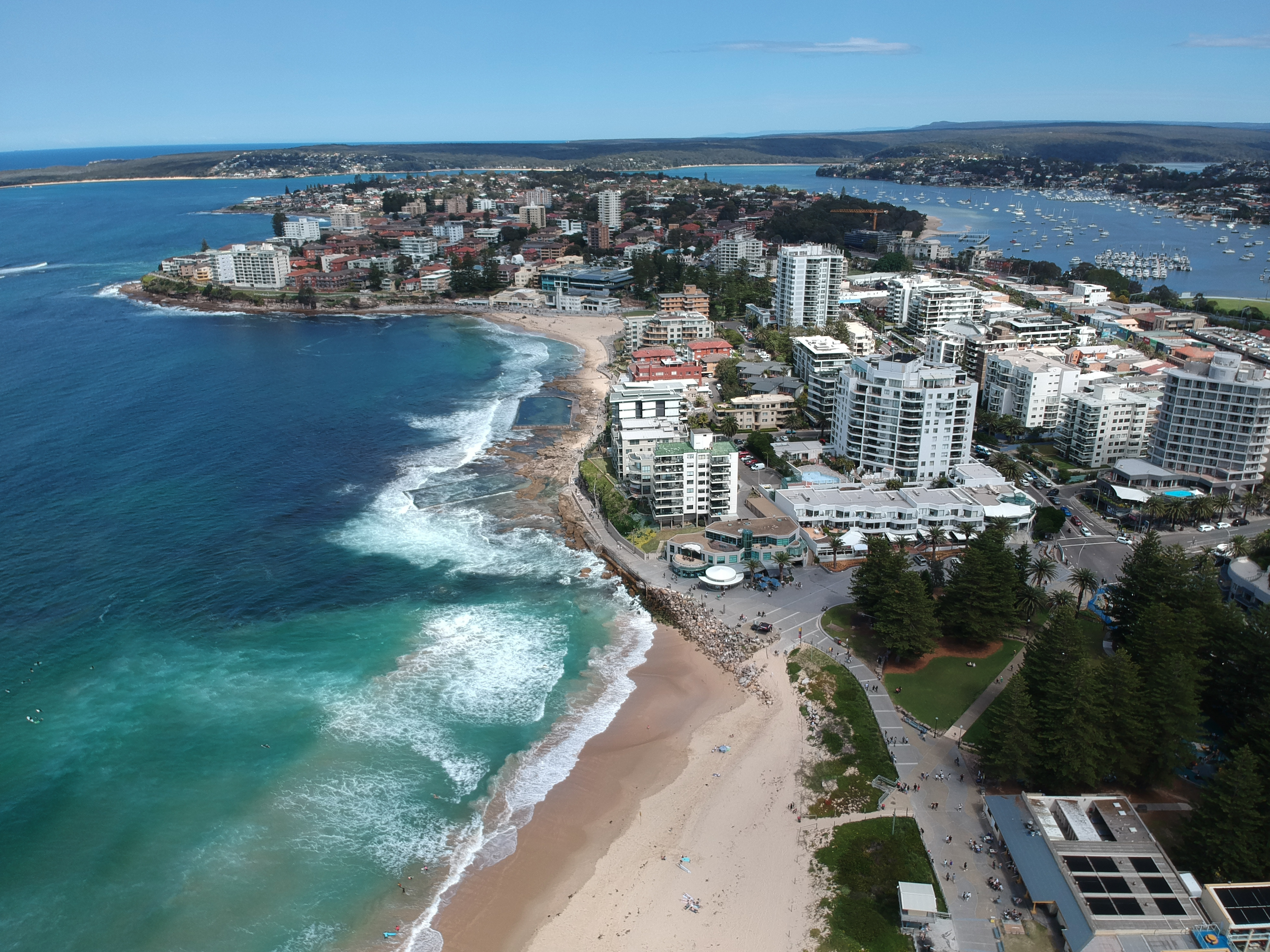
Cronulla

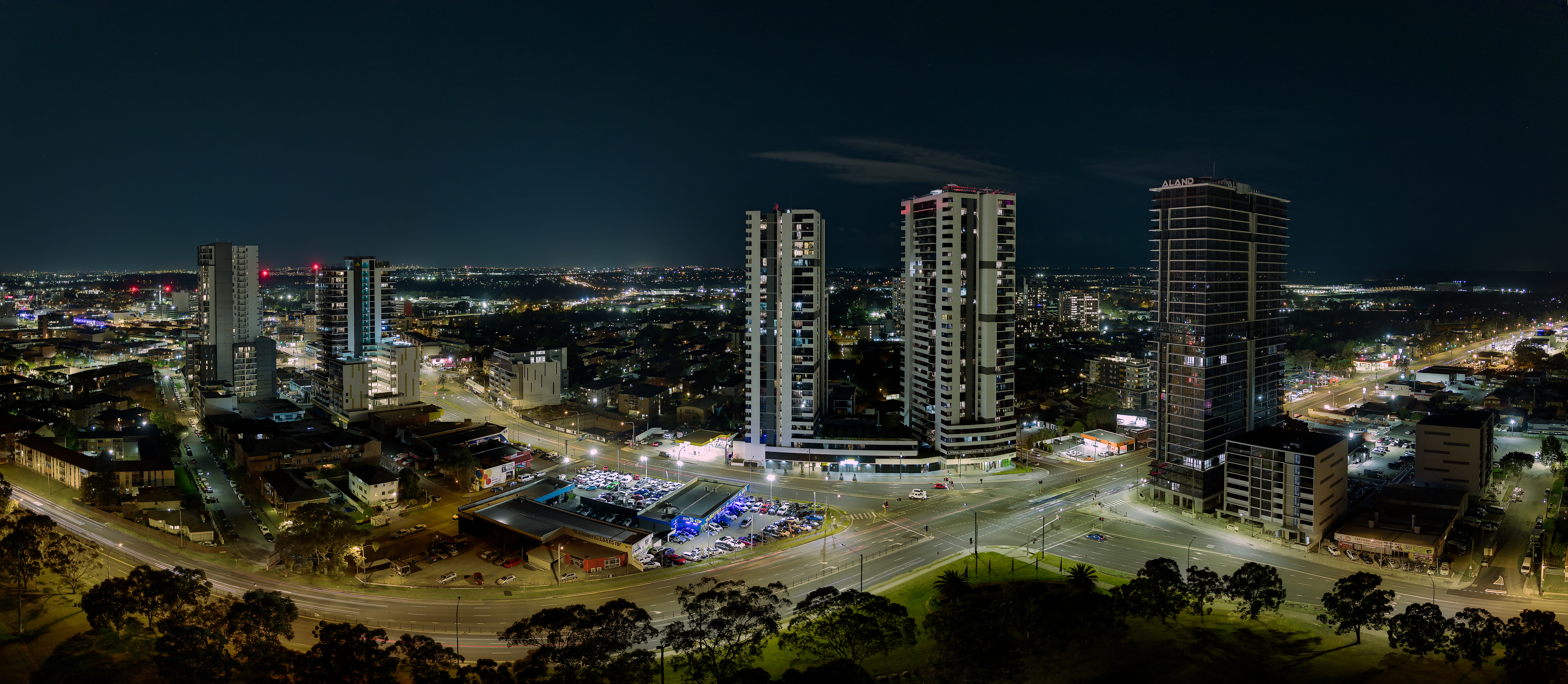
Liverpool

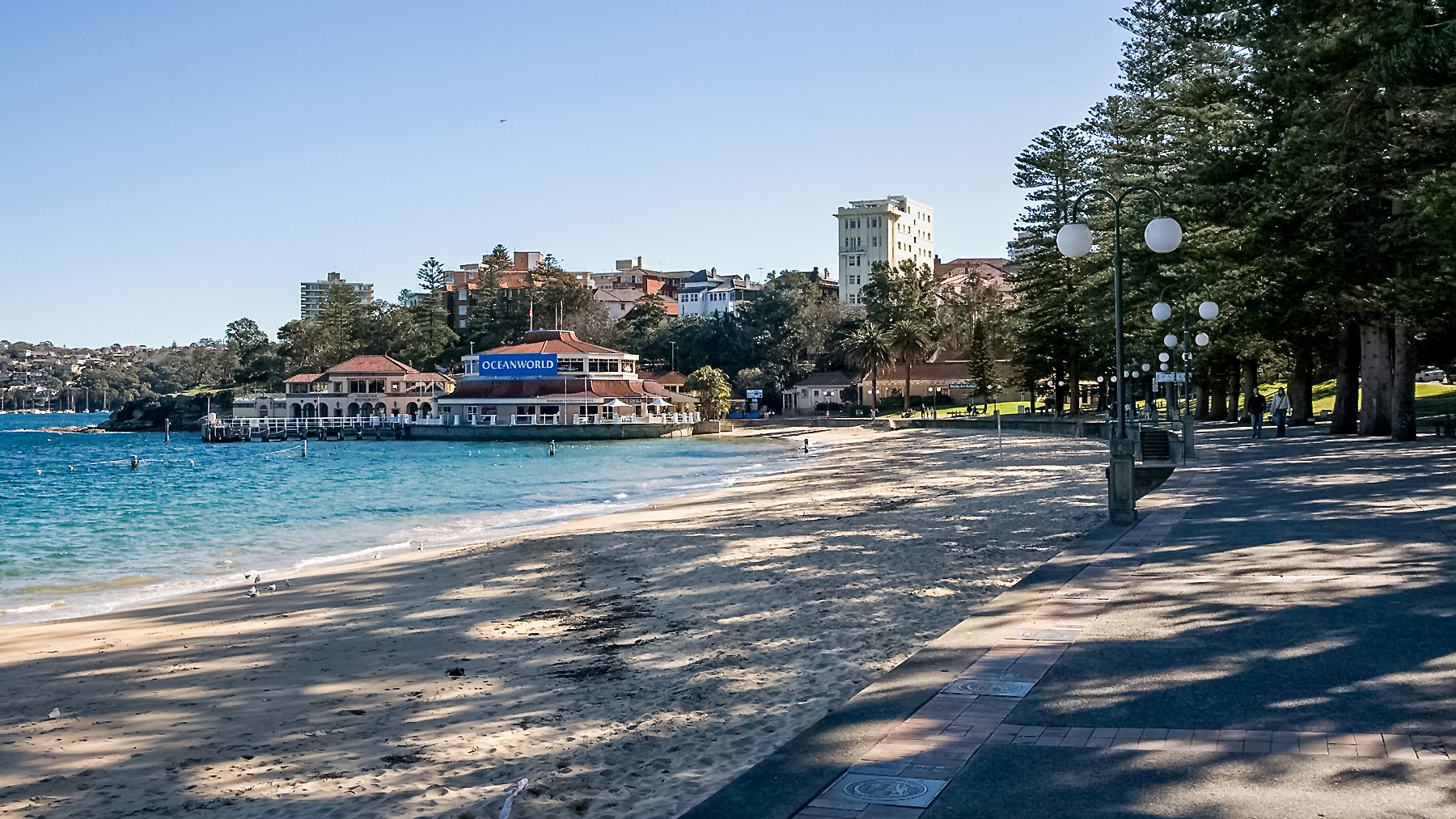
Manly

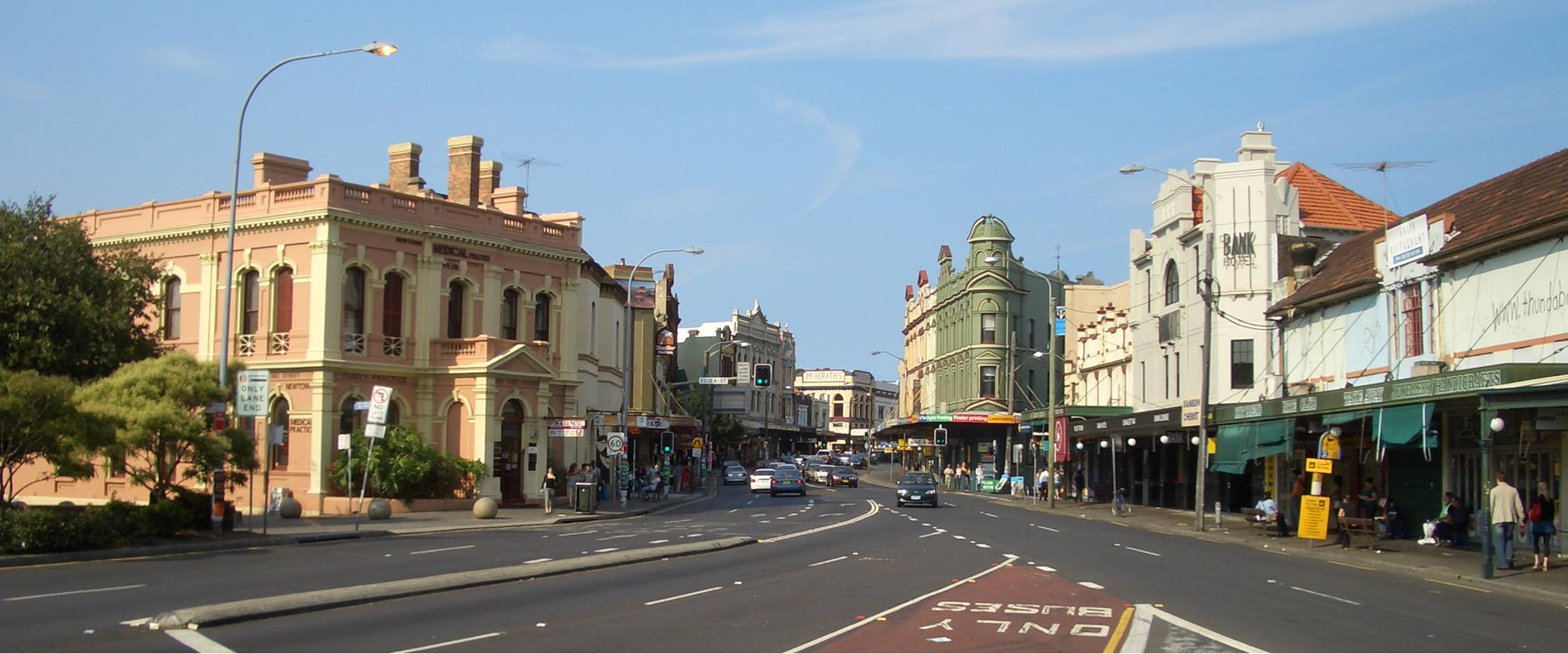
Newtown

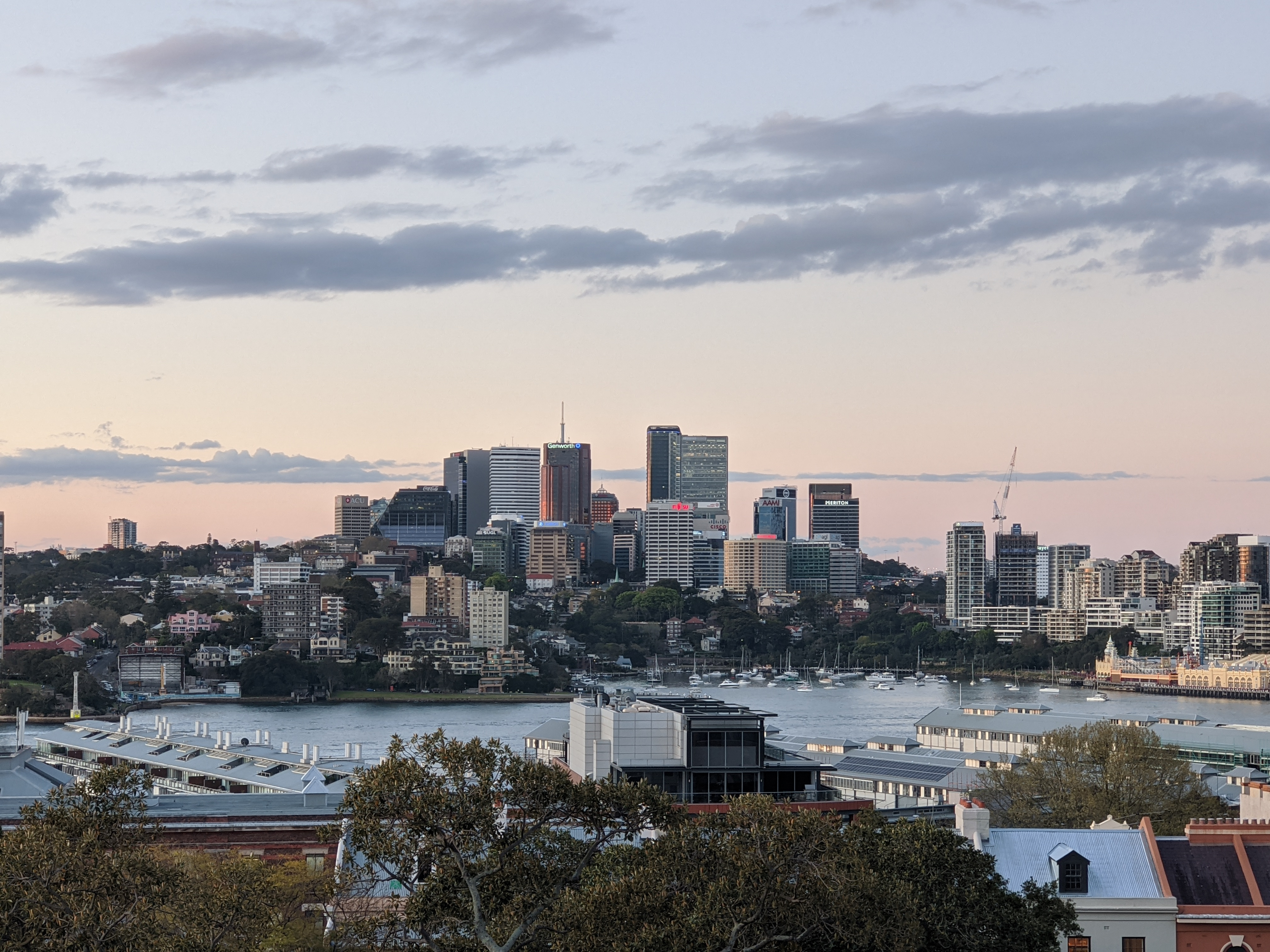
North Sydney

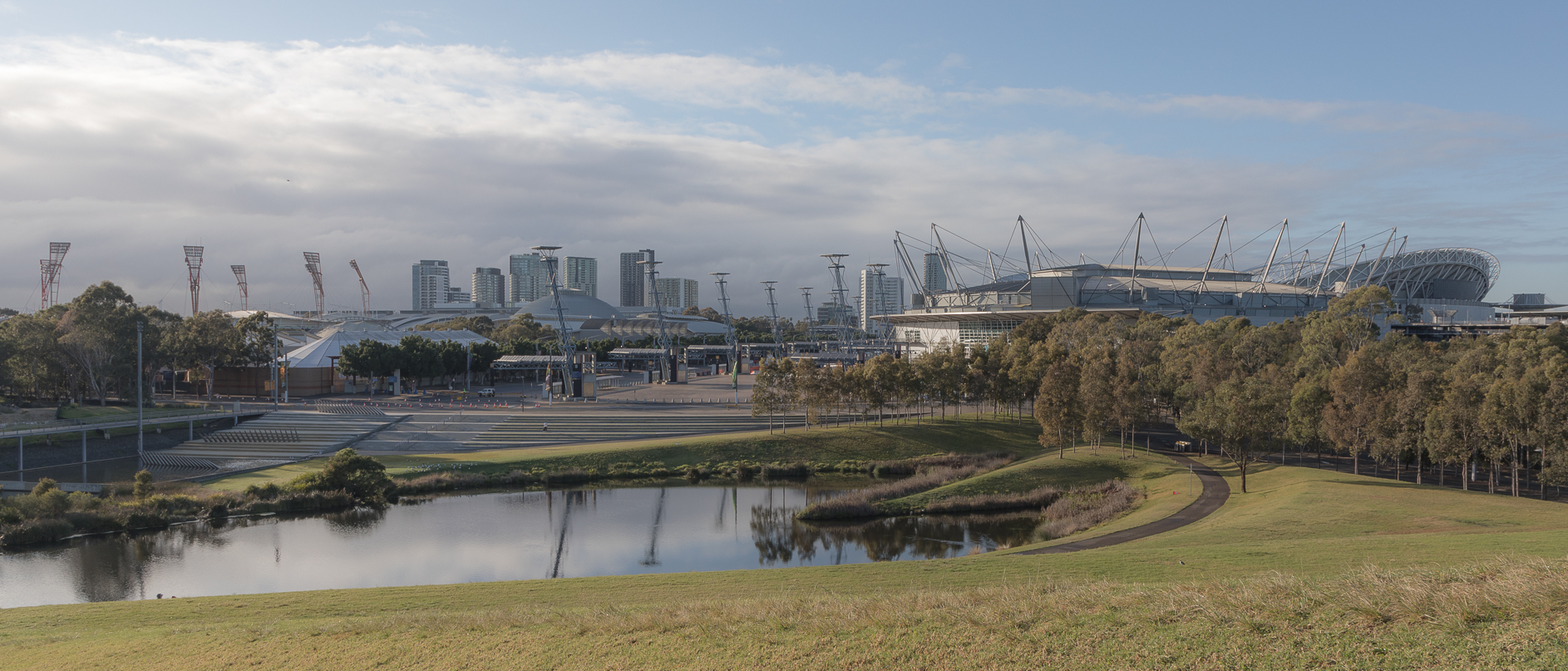
Sydney Olympic Park

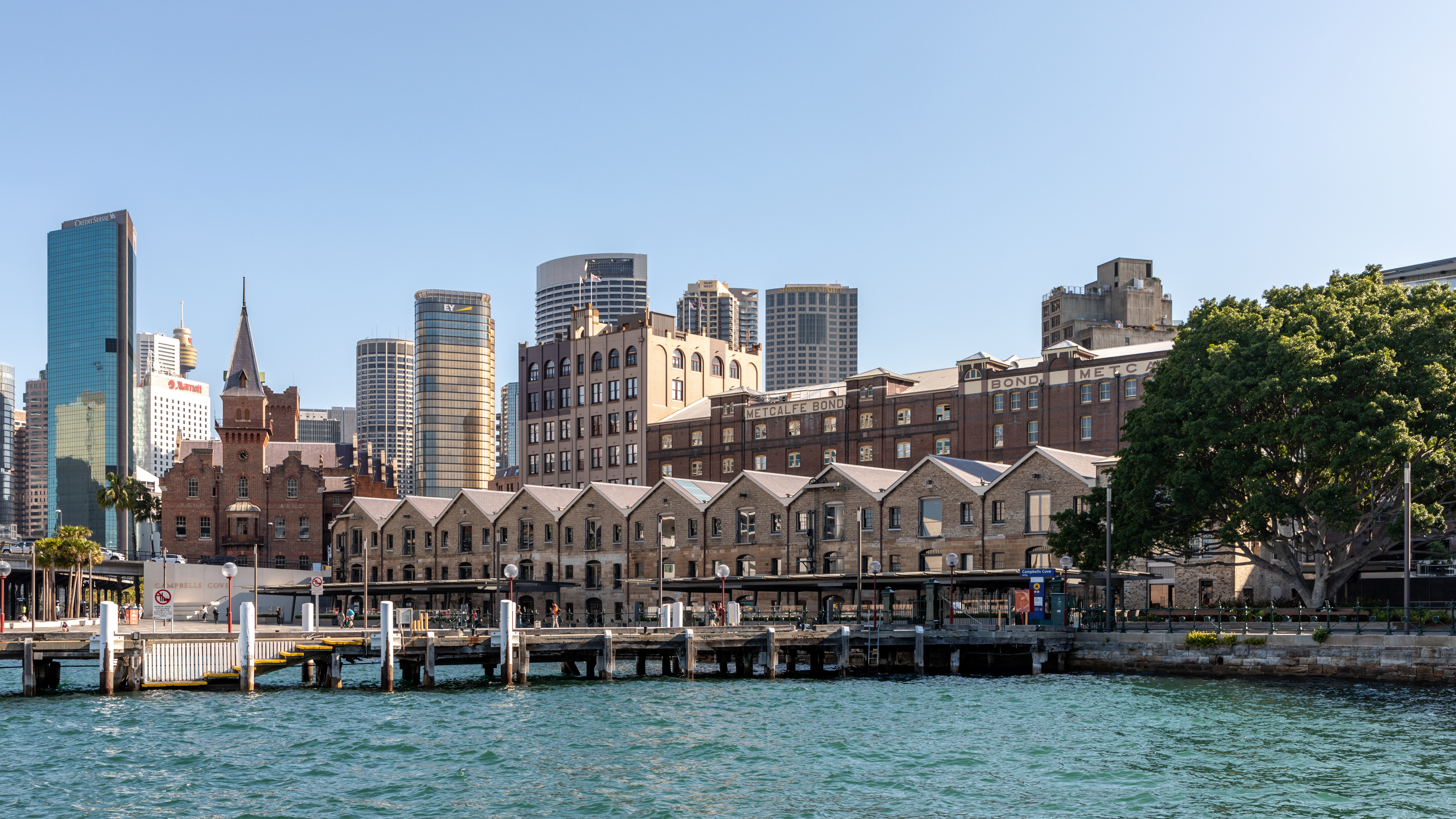
The Rocks

== A ==
Abbotsbury – Abbotsford – Acacia Gardens – Agnes Banks – Airds – Alexandria – Alfords Point – Allambie Heights – Allawah – Ambarvale – Angus – Annandale – Annangrove – Arcadia – Arncliffe – Arndell Park – Artarmon – Ashbury – Ashcroft – Ashfield – Asquith – Auburn – Austral – Avalon Beach

== B ==
Badgerys Creek – Balgowlah – Balgowlah Heights – Balmain – Balmain East – Bangor – Banksia – Banksmeadow – Bankstown – Bankstown Aerodrome – Barangaroo – Barden Ridge – Bardia – Bardwell Park – Bardwell Valley – Bass Hill – Baulkham Hills – Bayview – Beacon Hill – Beaconsfield – Beaumont Hills – Beecroft – Belfield – Bella Vista – Bellevue Hill – Belmore – Belrose – Berala – Berkshire Park – Berowra – Berowra Heights – Berowra Waters – Berrilee – Beverley Park – Beverly Hills – Bexley – Bexley North – Bidwill – Bilgola Beach – Bilgola Plateau – Birchgrove – Birrong – Blackett – Blacktown – Blair Athol – Blairmount – Blakehurst – Blaxlands Ridge – Bligh Park – Bondi – Bondi Beach – Bondi Junction – Bonnet Bay – Bonnyrigg – Bonnyrigg Heights – Bossley Park – Botany – Bow Bowing – Box Hill – Bradbury – Bradfield – Breakfast Point – Brighton-Le-Sands – Bringelly – Bronte – Brooklyn – Brookvale – Bundeena – Bungarribee – Burraneer – Burwood – Burwood Heights – Busby

== C ==
Cabarita – Cabramatta – Cabramatta West – Caddens – Cambridge Gardens – Cambridge Park – Camden – Camden Park – Camden South – Camellia – Cammeray – Campbelltown – Camperdown – Campsie – Canada Bay – Canley Heights – Canley Vale – Canoelands – Canterbury – Caringbah – Caringbah South – Carlingford – Carlton – Carnes Hill – Carramar – Carss Park – Cartwright – Castle Cove – Castle Hill – Castlecrag – Castlereagh – Casula – Catherine Field – Cattai – Cawdor – Cecil Hills – Cecil Park – Centennial Park – Chatswood – Chatswood West – Cheltenham – Cherrybrook – Chester Hill – Chifley – Chippendale – Chipping Norton – Chiswick – Chullora – Church Point – Claremont Meadows – Clarendon – Clareville – Claymore – Clemton Park – Clontarf – Clovelly – Clyde – Coasters Retreat – Cobbitty – Colebee – Collaroy – Collaroy Plateau – Colyton – Como – Concord – Concord West – Condell Park – Connells Point – Constitution Hill – Coogee – Cornwallis – Cottage Point – Cowan – Cranebrook – Cremorne – Cremorne Point – Cromer – Cronulla – Crows Nest – Croydon – Croydon Park – Cumberland Reach – Curl Curl – Currans Hill – Currawong Beach

== D ==
Daceyville – Dangar Island – Darling Point – Darlinghurst – Darlington – Davidson – Dawes Point – Dean Park – Dee Why – Denham Court – Denistone – Denistone East – Denistone West – Dharruk – Dolans Bay – Dolls Point – Doonside – Double Bay – Dover Heights – Drummoyne – Duffys Forest – Dulwich Hill – Dundas – Dundas Valley – Dural

== E ==
Eagle Vale – Earlwood – East Hills – East Killara – East Kurrajong – East Lindfield – East Ryde – Eastern Creek – Eastgardens – Eastlakes – Eastwood – Ebenezer – Edensor Park – Edgecliff – Edmondson Park – Elanora Heights – Elderslie – Elizabeth Bay – Elizabeth Hills – Ellis Lane – Elvina Bay – Emerton – Emu Heights – Emu Plains – Enfield – Engadine – Englorie Park – Enmore – Epping – Ermington – Erskine Park – Erskineville – Eschol Park – Eveleigh

== F ==
Fairfield – Fairfield East – Fairfield Heights – Fairfield West – Fairlight – Fiddletown – Five Dock – Flemington – Forest Glen – Forest Lodge – Forestville – Freemans Reach – Frenchs Forest – Freshwater

== G ==
Gables – Galston – Georges Hall – Gilead – Girraween – Gladesville – Glebe – Gledswood Hills – Glen Alpine – Glendenning – Glenfield – Glenhaven – Glenmore Park – Glenorie – Glenwood – Glossodia – Gordon – Grantham Farm – Granville – Grasmere – Grays Point – Great Mackerel Beach – Green Valley – Greenacre – Greendale – Greenfield Park – Greenhills Beach – Greenwich – Green Square – Gregory Hills – Greystanes – Grose Vale – Grose Wold – Guildford – Guildford West – Gymea – Gymea Bay

== H ==
Haberfield – Hammondville – Harrington Park – Harris Park – Hassall Grove – Haymarket – Heathcote – Hebersham – Heckenberg – Henley – Hillsdale – Hinchinbrook – Hobartville – Holroyd – Holsworthy – Homebush – Homebush West – Horningsea Park – Hornsby – Hornsby Heights – Horsley Park – Hoxton Park – Hunters Hill – Huntingwood – Huntleys Cove – Huntleys Point – Hurlstone Park – Hurstville – Hurstville Grove

== I ==
Illawong – Ingleburn – Ingleside

== J ==
Jamisontown – Jannali – Jordan Springs

== K ==
Kangaroo Point – Kareela – Kearns – Kellyville – Kellyville Ridge – Kemps Creek – Kensington – Kenthurst – Kentlyn – Killara – Killarney Heights – Kings Langley – Kings Park – Kingsford – Kingsgrove – Kingswood – Kirkham – Kirrawee – Kirribilli – Kogarah – Kogarah Bay – Ku-ring-gai Chase – Kurmond – Kurnell – Kurraba Point – Kurrajong – Kurrajong Hills – Kyeemagh – Kyle Bay

== L ==
La Perouse – Lakemba – Lalor Park – Lane Cove – Lane Cove North – Lane Cove West – Lansdowne – Lansvale – Laughtondale – Lavender Bay – Leets Vale – Leichhardt – Len Waters Estate – Leonay – Leppington – Lethbridge Park – Leumeah – Lewisham – Liberty Grove – Lidcombe – Lilli Pilli – Lilyfield – Lindfield – Linley Point – Little Bay – Liverpool – Llandilo – Loftus – Londonderry – Long Point – Longueville – Lovett Bay – Lower Portland – Lucas Heights – Luddenham – Lugarno – Lurnea

== M ==
Macquarie Fields – Macquarie Links – Macquarie Park – Maianbar – Malabar – Manly – Manly Vale – Maraylya – Marayong – Maroota – Maroubra – Marrickville – Marsden Park – Marsfield – Mascot – Matraville – Mays Hill – McCarrs Creek – McGraths Hill – McMahons Point – Meadowbank – Melonba – Melrose Park – Menai – Menangle Park – Merrylands – Merrylands West – Middle Cove – Middle Dural – Middleton Grange – Miller – Millers Point – Milperra – Milsons Passage – Milsons Point – Minchinbury – Minto – Minto Heights – Miranda – Mona Vale – Monterey – Moore Park – Moorebank – Morning Bay – Mortdale – Mortlake – Mosman – Mount Annan – Mount Colah – Mount Druitt – Mount Kuring-Gai – Mount Lewis – Mount Pritchard – Mount Vernon – Mulgoa – Mulgrave

== N ==
Narellan – Narellan Vale – Naremburn – Narrabeen – Narraweena – Narwee – Nelson – Neutral Bay – Newington – Newport – Newtown – Nirimba Fields – Normanhurst – North Balgowlah – North Bondi – North Curl Curl – North Epping – North Kellyville – North Manly – North Narrabeen – North Parramatta – North Richmond – North Rocks – North Ryde – North St Ives – North St Marys – North Strathfield – North Sydney – North Turramurra – North Wahroonga – North Willoughby – Northbridge – Northmead – Northwood – Norwest

== O ==
Oakhurst – Oakville – Oatlands – Oatley – Old Guildford – Old Toongabbie – Oran Park – Orchard Hills – Oxford Falls – Oxley Park – Oyster Bay

== P ==
Paddington – Padstow – Padstow Heights – Pagewood – Palm Beach – Panania – Parklea – Parramatta – Peakhurst – Peakhurst Heights – Pemulwuy – Pendle Hill – Pennant Hills – Penrith – Penshurst – Petersham – Phillip Bay – Picnic Point – Pitt Town – Pitt Town Bottoms – Pleasure Point – Plumpton – Point Piper – Port Botany – Port Hacking – Potts Hill – Potts Point – Prairiewood – Prestons – Prospect – Punchbowl – Putney – Pymble – Pyrmont

== Q ==
Quakers Hill – Queens Park – Queenscliff

== R ==
Raby – Ramsgate – Ramsgate Beach – Randwick – Redfern – Regents Park – Regentville – Revesby – Revesby Heights – Rhodes – Richards – Richmond – Richmond Lowlands – Riverstone – Riverview – Riverwood – Rockdale – Rodd Point – Rookwood – Rooty Hill – Ropes Crossing – Rose Bay – Rosebery – Rosehill – Roselands – Rosemeadow – Roseville – Roseville Chase – Rossmore – Rouse Hill – Royal National Park – Rozelle – Ruse – Rushcutters Bay – Russell Lea – Rydalmere – Ryde

== S ==
Sackville – Sackville North – Sadleir – Sandringham – Sandy Point – Sans Souci – Scheyville – Schofields – Scotland Island – Seaforth – Sefton – Seven Hills – Shalvey – Shanes Park – Silverwater – Singletons Mill – Smeaton Grange – Smithfield – South Coogee – South Granville – South Hurstville – South Maroota – South Penrith – South Turramurra – South Wentworthville – South Windsor – Spring Farm – St Andrews – St Clair – St Helens Park – St Ives – St Ives Chase – St Johns Park – St Leonards – St Marys – St Peters – Stanhope Gardens – Stanmore – Strathfield – Strathfield South – Summer Hill – Surry Hills – Sutherland – Sydenham – Sydney Olympic Park – Sylvania – Sylvania Waters – Sydney

== T ==
Tallawong – Tamarama – Taren Point – Telopea – Tempe – Tennyson – Tennyson Point – Terrey Hills – The Ponds – The Rocks – The Slopes – Thornleigh – Toongabbie – Tregear – Turramurra – Turrella

== U ==
Ultimo

== V ==
Varroville – Vaucluse – Villawood – Vineyard – Voyager Point

== W ==
Wahroonga – Waitara – Wakeley – Wallacia – Wareemba – Warrawee – Warriewood – Warwick Farm – Waterfall – Waterloo – Watsons Bay – Wattle Grove – Waverley – Waverton – Wedderburn – Wentworth Point – Wentworthville – Werrington – Werrington County – Werrington Downs – West Hoxton – West Killara – West Pennant Hills – West Pymble – West Ryde – Westleigh – Westmead – Wetherill Park – Whalan – Whale Beach – Wheeler Heights – Wilberforce – Wiley Park – Willmot – Willoughby – Willoughby East – Windsor – Windsor Downs – Winston Hills – Wisemans Ferry – Wolli Creek – Wollstonecraft – Woodbine – Woodcroft – Woodpark – Woollahra – Woolloomooloo – Woolooware – Woolwich – Woronora – Woronora Heights

== Y ==
Yagoona – Yarramundi – Yarrawarrah – Yennora – Yowie Bay

== Z ==
Zetland
