= Kurrajong Heights Hotel =

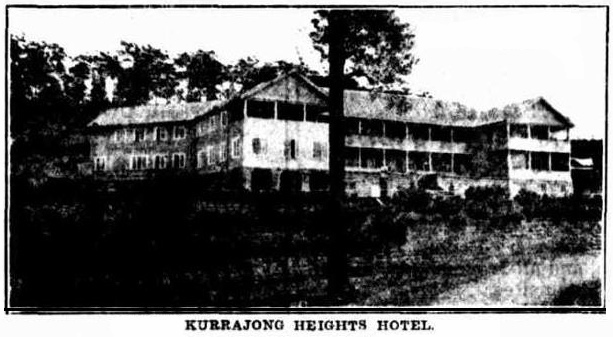
- Kurrajong Heights Hotel 1932
- Interactive map of the Kurrajong Heights Hotel area

General information
- Status: Demolished
- Type: Hotel
- Location: New South Wales, 1349 Bells Line of Road, Kurrajong Heights, Australia
- Coordinates: 33°31′22″S 150°37′39″E
- Elevation: 495 m (1,624 ft)
- Groundbreaking: April, 1927
- Opened: 18 August 1928 by Hon. G. R. McDonald, M.L.C.
- Closed: 13 April 1975
- Demolished: 14 April 1975
- Cost: £30,000
- Landlord: Mr. and Mrs. E. S. Day

Height
- Roof: Tiles

Technical details
- Material: Stone and brick
- Floor count: East 3 floors, west 2 floors
- Lifts/elevators: nil
- Grounds: 98 acres

Design and construction
- Architect: George Herbert Goodsell
- Architecture firm: Robertson and Marks, Architects, Sydney
- Main contractor: Mr. R. P. Blundell

Other information
- Number of rooms: 22 bedrooms

Kurrajong Heights Hotel was a residential hotel on the main road from Richmond to Bell, known as Bell's Line of Road in the state of New South Wales, Australia. Kurrajong Heights is a town 79 kilometres (49 mi) north-west of Sydney, in the local government area of the City of Hawkesbury. It is stretched across the Bells Line of Road in the Blue Mountains, west of Kurrajong and east of Bilpin.

At the hotel's opening in 1928, Kurrajong Heights had a population of around 150.

== Opening ==
The Kurrajong Heights Hotel was officially opened at 12:30pm on Saturday, 18 August, 1928 by Mrs. H. E. Peck at the invitation of the Chairman of Directors (Hon. G. R. McDonald, M.L.C.) Mr.G. H. Goodsell handed Mrs. Peck a gold key, with which she opened the front door and signalled the gathering to enter while a band played the National Anthem. Inside the building Mrs. Peck declared the hotel "well and truly open."
