= Bells Line of Road =

Road in New South Wales, Australia

Bells Line of Road New South Wales
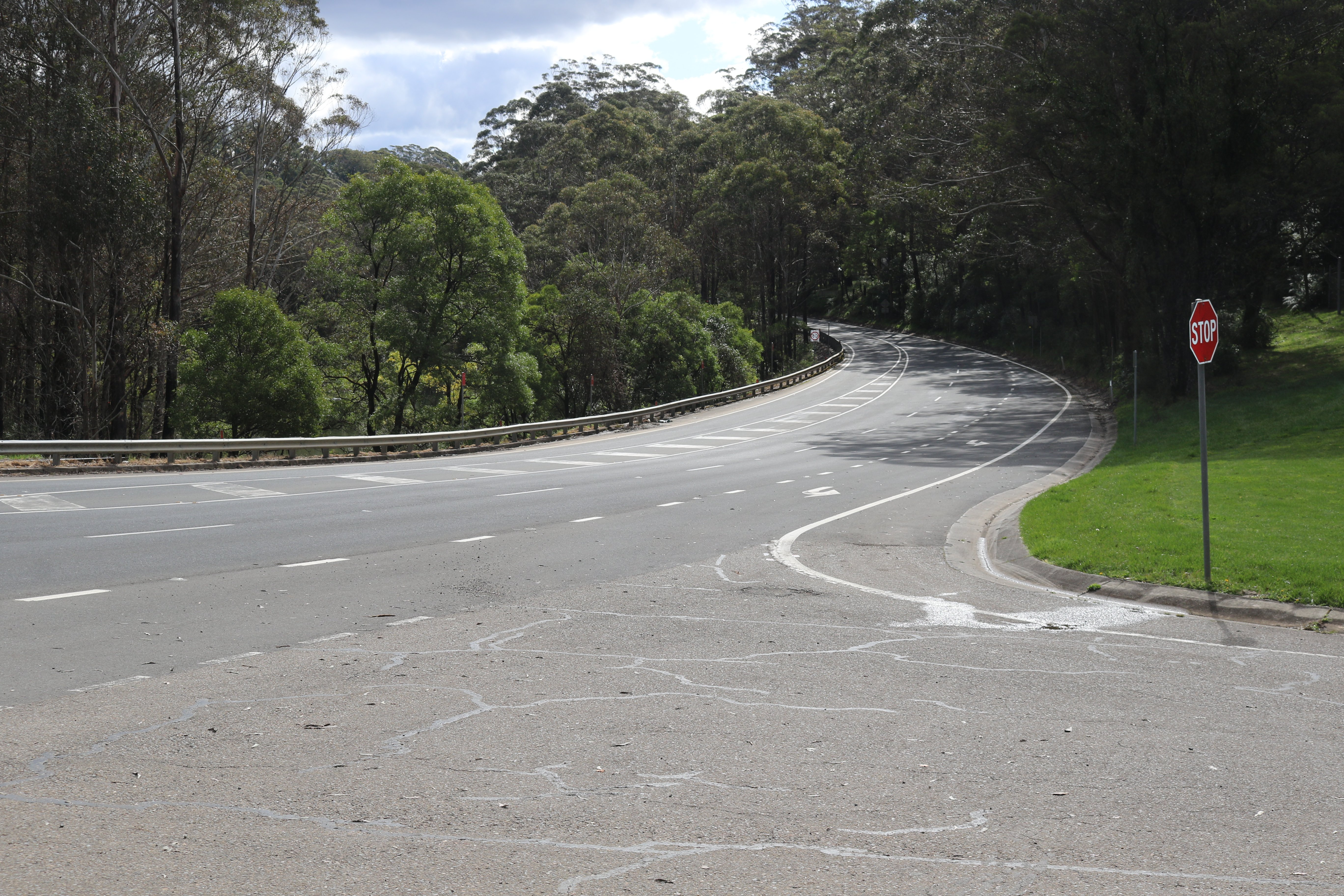
- Mount Tomah, Australia
- Coordinates: 33.511482°S 150.280724°E (West end); 33.588607°S 150.729495°E (East end)

General information
- Type: Road
- Length: 58.6 km (36 mi)
- Gazetted: August 1928
- Route number(s): B59 (2013–present)
- Former route number: State Route 40 (1974–2013)

Major junctions
- West end: Chifley Road; Bell, New South Wales
- Darling Causeway
- East end: Kurrajong Road; Richmond, Sydney

Location(s)
- Major suburbs: Mount Tomah, Berambing, Bilpin, Kurrajong Heights, Kurmond

Bells Line of Road is a 59-kilometre (37 mi) major road located in New South Wales, Australia, providing an alternative crossing of the Blue Mountains to the Great Western Highway. The eastern terminus of the road is in Richmond, 51 km northwest of Sydney, where the road continues eastward as Kurrajong Road, which intersects the A9. The western terminus of the road is in Bell, in the Blue Mountains, where the road continues as the Chifley Road.

The route, part of the traditional Aboriginal pathway network, was shown to Archibald Bell, Jr. by Darug men Emery and Cogy in 1823. Subsequently, he was accompanied by the Government Assistant Surveyor and the route marked was known as Bell's Line, to be later cleared to become the second road across the Blue Mountains. Due to its condition and the gradients around Mount Tomah it was rarely used before World War II. The road was improved between 1939 and 1943, as an alternative to the Great Western Highway for the war effort. At the same time that it was improved, the road from Bell via Scenic Hill to Lithgow was built, so that the Darling Causeway (the conjoining road connecting Bell and Mount Victoria) carries relatively little traffic, but is a significant tourist route.

Today, the route is still used as an alternative route across the Blue Mountains and is also a popular tourist drive.

In June 2025, the Government of New South Wales announced the progression of a funding injection of $100 million from the federal government for upgrades to the road.

== Route ==
The eastern terminus of Bells Line of Road as an identified route began at the edge of the town of Richmond, but now officially begins at the Richmond Bridge across the Hawkesbury River. West of the Hawkesbury River it passes through the town of North Richmond and the village of Kurmond, before bypassing Kurrajong. At Bellbird Hill it then proceeds to climb onto the Bell Range of the Blue Mountains, passing through Kurrajong Heights. When on the range, it proceeds through the fruit-growing areas of Bilpin and Berambing, before climbing and descending Mount Tomah, passing by the Mount Tomah Botanic Gardens. After Mount Tomah it proceeds through the Blue Mountains National Park passing Mount Bell and Mount Charles and passing close to Pierces Pass and Mount Banks. Eight kilometres (5.0 mi) before Bell is the turn off to the villages of Mount Wilson and Mount Irvine. At the village of Bell, Bells Line of Road turns south to run along the crest of the Darling Causeway to Mount Victoria, passing the site of the now-demolished Hartley Vale railway station. From Bell the majority of traffic uses Chifley Road, which goes west to Lithgow and Great Western Highway.

The route has numerous sections of steep and winding road. The steepest section is at Bellbird Hill, where the road rises around 450 metres (1,480 ft) from the Hawkesbury Valley to the Bell Range. The road is steep with a grade of 1:8 and has several tight bends. Other steep sections include the east and west ascents of Mount Tomah and Mount Bell as well as "The Glen" on the west side of Kurrajong Heights.

=== Alternative routes ===
The next trafficable road north of Bells Line of Road that crosses the Blue Mountains is the Bylong Valley Way, which forms a more direct route between the Central West region and the Hunter Valley, including the Port of Newcastle.

== History ==
The passing of the Main Roads Act of 1924 through the Parliament of New South Wales provided for the declaration of Main Roads, roads partially funded by the State government through the Main Roads Board. Main Road No. 184 was declared along this road on 8 August 1928, from Richmond, via Bilpin to Bell (and continuing southwards along Darling Causeway to the intersection with Great Western Highway at Mount Victoria, and continuing eastwards via Windsor along Windsor Road to Parramatta); with the passing of the Main Roads (Amendment) Act, 1929 to provide for additional declarations of State Highways and Trunk Roads, this was amended to Main Road 184 on 8 April 1929.

The passing of the Roads Act 1993 updated road classifications and the way they could be declared within New South Wales. Under this legislation, Bells Line of Road retains its declaration as part of Main Road 184.

The route was allocated part of State Route 40 in 1974. With the conversion to the newer alphanumeric system in 2013, this was replaced with route B59.

=== Lowered speed limits ===
In November 2007, the Roads & Traffic Authority (RTA) announced plans to lower the speed limits along much of Bells Line of Road. Within a week, sufficient opposition was expressed that the changes were put on hold. In October 2008, the same changes were again announced, with the RTA claiming that there had been community consultation, but numerous users of the road, including MPs and councillors based west of the Blue Mountains, claimed to have been unaware of any consultation. As a result of the changes, the maximum speed limit east of Bell is now 80 kilometres per hour (50 mph).

== Junctions ==
LGA	Location	km	mi	Destinations	Notes
Hawkesbury	Richmond	0.0	0.0	Kurrajong Road (B59 east) – Richmond, Windsor, Sydney	Eastern terminus of road, route B59 continues east along Kurrajong Road
Hawkesbury	Richmond	0.0	0.0	Old Kurrajong Road (north) – Richmond; Yarramundi Lane (south) - Agnes Banks	
Hawkesbury River		0.7	0.43	Bridge (no known official name)	
Hawkesbury	North Richmond	1.4	0.87	Terrace Road (north) - Freemans Reach; Grose Vale Road (south) - Grose Vale, Grose Wold	
Hawkesbury	North Richmond	2.1	1.3	Crooked Lane – Tennyson	
Hawkesbury	Kurmond	5.6	3.5	Kurmond Road - Kurmond	
Hawkesbury	Kurrajong	7.3	4.5	Comleroy Road - East Kurrajong	
Hawkesbury	Kurrajong	7.5	4.7	Old Bells Line of Road – Kurrajong	
Blue Mountains	Mount Wilson	51.2	31.8	Mount Wilson Road – Mount Wilson, Mount Irvine	Uncontrolled T intersection
Blue Mountains	Bell	58.4	36.3	Main Western railway line	
Blue Mountains	Bell	58.6	36.4	Darling Causeway (south) – Mount Victoria, Springwood	
Blue Mountains	Bell	58.6	36.4	Chifley Road (B59 west) – Lithgow	Western terminus of road, route B59 continues west along Chifley Road
1.000 mi = 1.609 km; 1.000 km = 0.621 mi: Route transition

== Future ==
For many years, road-lobby groups have been pushing for what they call a "superhighway" across the Blue Mountains. They claim that the poor roads across the Blue Mountains are impeding economic growth west of the Mountains.

In 2002, road-lobby groups secured $2 million in funding for a feasibility study into building a freeway following Bells Line of Road. The proposed freeway would have linked to the M2 Hills Motorway in Sydney and connected to the Great Western Highway west of Lithgow via a route across the Newnes Plateau. The study report, published in November 2004 concluded that, while feasible to build from an engineering perspective, it would not be economically feasible and would have massive impact on adjacent national parks and local communities.

The Great Western Highway has been the main route across the Blue Mountains since its construction in 1815, but after the above studies found that a freeway would be too expensive to build along the route of Bells Line of Road, the idea was abandoned. However Roads & Maritime Services' 2017 road corridor improvement program provides for a somewhat more modest program of upgradings. It is also revisiting studies last undertaken in the 1960s to extend the planned Castlereagh Freeway (subsequently partly-built as the M2) to connect with Bell's Line of Road at Kurrajong Heights. If this project were to be implemented it would force major improvements to be undertaken to the route followed by Bell's Line of Road, due to the traffic volumes that would be generated by a freeway. Conversely, a freeway could not be justified without a major capacity increase on the Bell's Line of Road route.
