= The Slopes =

The Slopes may refer to:

- The Slopes, Buxton, a Grade-II-listed public park in England
- The Slopes, New South Wales, a town in Australia
