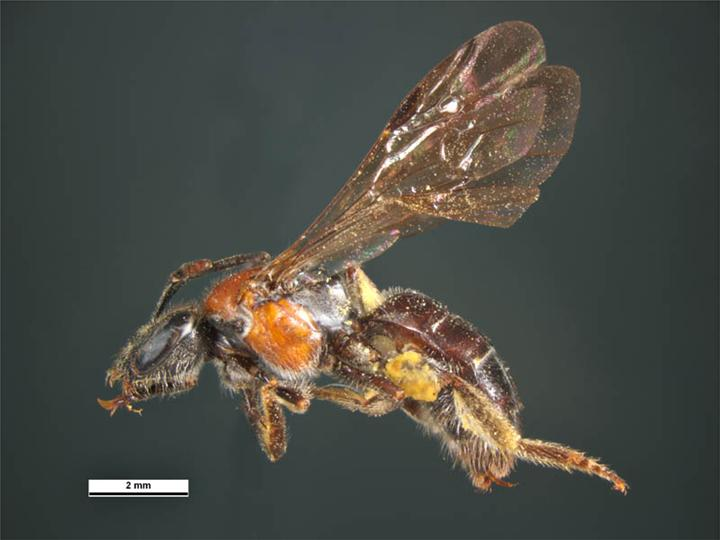
- Female
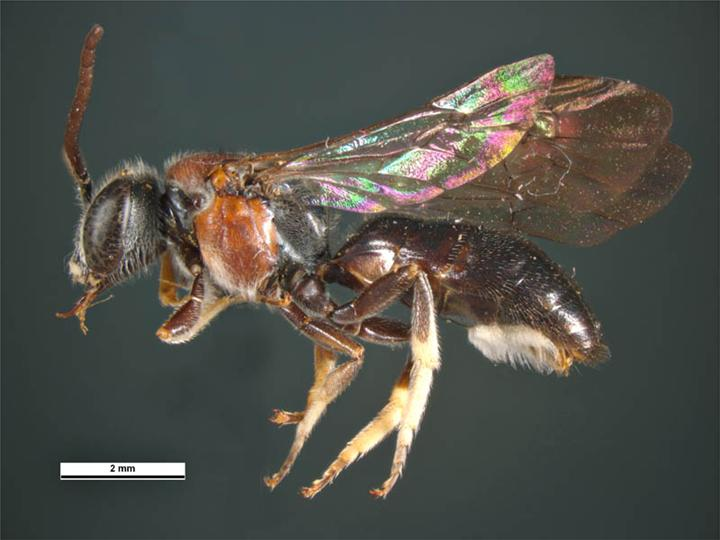
- Male

Scientific classification
- Kingdom: Animalia
- Phylum: Arthropoda
- Clade: Pancrustacea
- Class: Insecta
- Order: Hymenoptera
- Family: Halictidae
- Genus: Lasioglossum
- Species: L. callomelittinum

Binomial name
- Lasioglossum callomelittinum (Cockerell, 1910)

Synonyms
- Parasphecodes callomelittinus Cockerell, 1910; Halictus ruficollis Friese, 1924; Parasphecodes rufocollaris Cockerell, 1930; Callomelitta anomala Rayment, 1935

= Lasioglossum callomelittinum =

Species of bee

Lasioglossum callomelittinum, or Lasioglossum (Callalictus) callomelittinum, is a species of bee in the family Halictidae and subfamily Halictinae. It is endemic to Australia. It was described by British-American entomologist Theodore Dru Alison Cockerell in 1910.

== Description ==
Female body length is about 8.5 mm. Integumental colouration is mainly black, with reddish-brown markings. The hair is white to brownish.

== Distribution and habitat ==
The species occurs in south-eastern mainland Australia. Type localities include Adelaide, Melbourne, Bilpin and the Lamington National Park.

== Behaviour ==
The adults are flying mellivores.
