= Richmond Lowlands =

- Suburb
- Interactive map of Richmond Lowlands
- Coordinates: 33°33′55″S 150°45′35″E
- Country: Australia
- State: New South Wales
- City: Sydney
- LGA: City of Hawkesbury
- Location: 67.5 km (41.9 mi) from Sydney CBD

Government
  - State electorate: Hawkesbury
  - Federal division: Macquarie
- Elevation: 8 m (26 ft)

Population
  - Total: 55 (2021 census)
- Postcode: 2753
Suburbs around Richmond Lowlands
Tennyson	Tennyson	Freemans Reach
North Richmond	Richmond Lowlands	Wilberforce
North Richmond	Richmond	Cornwallis

Richmond Lowlands is a town of Sydney, in the state of New South Wales, Australia. It is located in the City of Hawkesbury south-west of Freemans Reach.

As of the 2021 census, the population of Richmond Lowlands was 55.

There is a history of cattle breeding with previous occupants including Moxie's dairy. There are also many turf farms in the area.
