= Yobarnie Keyline Farm =

- Location within New South Wales Location within Australia
- 33.5829°S 150.6975°E
- Location: 108 Grose Vale Road, North Richmond, City of Hawkesbury, New South Wales, Australia

History
- Built: 1943–1964

Site notes
- Architect: PA Yeomans
- Owner: Regent Property Group Buildev Development (NSW) Pty Ltd

New South Wales Heritage Register
- Official name: Yobarnie Keyline Farm; Redbank; Belmont Park
- Type: state heritage (landscape)
- Designated: 8 March 2013
- Reference no.: 1826
- Type: Agriculture
- Category: Farming and Grazing
- Builders: PA Yeomans

Yobarnie Keyline Farm is a heritage-listed former experimental farm and now pastoral property at 108 Grose Vale Road, North Richmond, New South Wales, an outer suburb of Sydney, Australia. It was designed by P.A. Yeomans and built by him from 1943 to 1964. It is also known as Redbank North Richmond and Belmont Park. The property is owned by Redbank Communities Pty Ltd. It was added to the New South Wales State Heritage Register on 8 March 2013.

== History ==
The original inhabitants of the Hawkesbury district were known as the Darug tribe of Aborigines, also known as Dharug or Daruk. Their name for the Hawkesbury River was recorded as Deerubbin and Venrubbin.

=== North Richmond ===
North Richmond was originally known as the village of Enfield. It is marked on the Parish of Currency, County Cook maps. The name was changed at a later date in the 19th century to avoid confusion with Enfield in Sydney's (inner) west. This interesting little township in the Hawkesbury has experienced many changes over the last 100 years.

Following European settlement of the eastern coast of Australia in 1788, Governor Phillip explored the Hawkesbury River and climbed Richmond Hill.

From 1794 European settlers were granted farms in Windsor along South Creek and the earliest grant in Richmond seems to have been 1795.

It was on this site in 1795 that there was a fierce battle between the Dharug inhabitants and soldiers of the colonial government.

Grants at North Richmond along the river date from 1796 and in the early 1800s, larger grants were given to members of the Rouse, Bell and Bowman families, including the land relating to this study which was granted to Archibald Bell.

=== Belmont Pastoral Estate ===
Governor Macquarie toured the New South Wales settlement in 1810. On the 1 December he and his party travelled to Richmond Hill, the "Kurry Jung Brush" and Richmond Terrace. They visited "Belmont" the home of Archibald Bell and he recorded in his journal:

"...rode up the hill to call on Mrs Bell (the wife of Lt. Bell of the 102nd Regiment) who resides on her Farm on the summit of this beautiful Hill, from which there is a very fine commanding Prospect of the River Hawkesbury and adjacent Country. We found Mrs Bell and her family at Home, and after sitting with them for about an hour, we again mounted our horses to prosecute our Excursion, directing our course for the Kurry Jung Hill".

A few days later on the 6 December 1810 Macquarie named the townships of Windsor, Richmond, Castlereagh, Wilberforce and Pitt Town.

While in 1813 Wentworth, Blaxland and Lawson successfully crossed the Blue Mountains, it was some ten years later in 1823 that Archibald Bell (Junior), son of Archibald Bell of Belmont, discovered an alternative route over the mountains which is (now) known as Bells Line of Road. This launched an expansion of land holdings in the west and a constant flow of traffic through North Richmond to Sydney.

By 1813 a school house had been constructed in the area which was also used as a temporary chapel. A Methodist Church was established in 1857 and Bishop Barker laid the foundation stone of St Phillip's Church of England on 23 May 1859 with a school house completed in 1861. Public education began in North Richmond with the opening of the Public School in 1871. The burial ground at St.Phillip's Church of England was consecrated in 1861; however the Bell family have their own vault on the site at Belmont Park.

The first house on the estate was built by Archibald Bell who lived there 1810-1849 but now the foundations of that house "Belmont" are all that remain.

An opulent mansion designed by Morell and Kemp and built by Howie for Phillip Charley, Director of BHP. who acquired the property in 1889. The mansion was completed in 1892, one storey high with cellars.

An unusual curved terracotta stair and balustrading in the centre axis leads down to a lower terrace whose centre feature is a sandstone and timber octagonal conservatory dated 1910.

The Charley family entertained lavishly, a feature of these occasions being theatrical performances in the courtyard which was provided with a stage opened by lowering the large window across the proscenium into the cellars. Leading to the house is a fine avenue of Canary Island date palms (Phoenix canariensis) approximately 1/2 mile (0.80 km) long, entered at an elaborate sandstone gate house built c. 1910.

The property has been developed as a psychiatric (St John of God) hospital. The property retains the mansion, gate house, formal driveway with date palm avenue, a garden pavilion/conservatory with grotto and a landscaped forecourt with pleasure grounds, all overlooking the Hawkesbury River. Its location on Richmond Hill includes an Aboriginal Memorial Garden. It was on this site in 1795 that there was a battle between the Dharug inhabitants and soldiers of the colonial government.

=== Yobarnie ===
Yobarnie (together with the adjacent St. John of God Hospital site) formed part of the historic core of the Belmont pastoral estate, developed by Archibald Bell from c.1804.

In 1943, Percival (P. A.) Yeomans, a retired mining engineer purchased two properties (Nevallan and Yobarnie) and, on Yobarnie, began conducting experiments in soil conservation and enrichment, erosion control and water management, based on his engineering insights. When Yeomans purchased Yobarnie and Nevallan, Yobarnie was already substantially cleared and this feature facilitated his early experiments there.

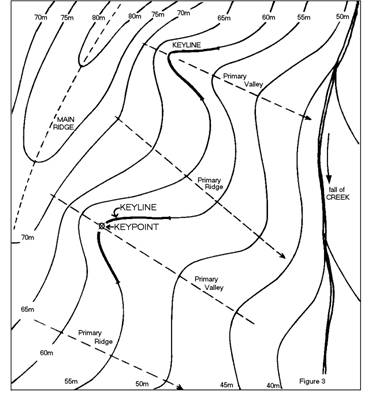
Contour map from P.A. Yeomans’ UN Habitat Speech, 1976

In 1944, the Geography Department of the University of Sydney began using the property for student mapping exercises which ultimately produced a complete contour map that guided future development of the Keyline System. By 1948, Yeomans devoted himself to his experiments on a full-time basis. After a further three years trialling various methods of artificial drainage, he abandoned this approach in favour of the system of deep soil ripping, ploughed contours and dams exploiting the natural topography of the place, that he called the Keyline System. The favourable results of this work on Yobarnie were then implemented on Nevallan which became the principal site for demonstrating the system.

By the early 1950s, the results achieved attracted numerous visitors to Nevallan and Yeomans' publications describing his discoveries excited the interest of agriculturalists worldwide. During the following decade, farmers in every corner of the world, confronted with poor soils on steep, undulating terrain adopted the Keyline method.

Following the death of his wife, in 1964, Yeomans was obliged to sell Yobarnie and Nevallan to pay estate taxes. The properties were purchased and operated as pasture for beef cattle (and erroneously known as "Peel's Dairy"). This use continues to the present.

In 2009, most of Yobarnie was purchased by a land development company which received planning permission from Hawkesbury City Council to construct a seniors' living facility on the portion of the property adjacent to the existing suburb of North Richmond. Local residents and members of the sustainable farming (permaculture) community became concerned that further development would obliterate the physical evidence of Yeomans' achievements and, in June, 2009, nominated the properties for heritage listing.

== Description ==
This pastoral properties is located on the south side of the Redbank Creek valley. It demonstrates the essential elements of Yeoman's Keyline System: the undulating terrain; the current hydrology of the place, as managed by the Keyline System - i.e. how water behaves there and both the big-picture and fine-grain biophysical effects of this; the dams; the ploughed contours and the resulting increased, enriched and productive topsoil. Together, these elements form a cohesive cultural landscape.

=== Condition ===
As at 6 December 2012, the Keyline system has not been actively maintained or operated on Yobarnie since 1964. A recent geotechnical assessment indicates that some maintenance would be required to bring the dams up to contemporary standards. The contours and dams of the original Keyline system are readily apparent to anyone acquainted with the system, despite their neglected and overgrown condition. Of the original 12 dams, 10 remain as built, although neglected and unmaintained, damage to dam walls by cattle appears negligible and easily repaired.

== Heritage listing ==
As at 6 December 2012, Yobarnie was one of the properties (the other was Nevallan) on which the Keyline system of soil improvement, erosion control, water storage, cultivation and irrigation on undulating topography was first developed and demonstrated from the mid-1940s. These properties are associated with Percival A Yeomans (1905–84), inventor of the Keyline system. Yeomans was the first contemporary Western agriculturalist to take a whole-system approach to sustainable design and management of the landscape. The property is held in high esteem by the permaculture and sustainable agricultural community. Yobarnie (with Nevallan) is unique in its ability to demonstrate the principles of the Keyline system of agriculture, on the site where this system was first developed, trialled and demonstrated.

Yobarnie Keyline Farm was listed on the New South Wales State Heritage Register on 8 March 2013 having satisfied the following criteria.

The place is important in demonstrating the course, or pattern, of cultural or natural history in New South Wales.

Yobarnie is of state heritage significance as the place in which the Keyline system of soil improvement, water storage, cultivation and irrigation on undulating topography was first developed and demonstrated. This system has since been adopted by farmers in almost every country in the world. The Keyline system is considered to be the precursor of the Permaculture movement. The properties continue the pastoral landuses begun when Yobarnie formed part of the Belmont estate, established in 1804.

The place has a strong or special association with a person, or group of persons, of importance of cultural or natural history of New South Wales's history.

Yobarnie is of state heritage significance for its association with Percival A Yeomans, inventor of the Keyline system. Yeoman's achievements were recognised internationally by the Prince Philip Design Award, in 1974, and a nationwide poll conducted by Country Life magazine placed him among the top 3 Australians who had contributed most to Australian agriculture.

The place is important in demonstrating aesthetic characteristics and/or a high degree of creative or technical achievement in New South Wales.

Yobarnie is of state heritage significance. It is the earliest legible evidence of the techniques and systems pioneered by PA Yeomans for soil improvement, water storage, cultivation and irrigation on undulating topography. In addition to the increased fertility and productivity of the soil subjected to the Keyline regime, by-products of the system include erosion prevention, increased fire safety, significant carbon sequestration and improved wildlife habitat. The distinctive cultural landscape resulting from this technical achievement is itself aesthetically pleasing and offers considerable scope for contributing to the visual and recreational amenity of any future adaptive reuse.

The place has a strong or special association with a particular community or cultural group in New South Wales for social, cultural or spiritual reasons.

Yobarnie is of state heritage significance for the high esteem in which it held by the state's (and indeed, the country's) agricultural community. This esteem is evidenced by a nationwide poll conducted by Country Life magazine that placed PA Yeomans among the top 3 Australians who had contributed most to Australian agriculture and by representations received from the practitioners and advocates of Permaculture attesting to the seminal role of the Keyline experiments in subsequent sustainable landuse theory and practice.

The place has potential to yield information that will contribute to an understanding of the cultural or natural history of New South Wales.

Yobarnie is of state heritage significance for its ability to demonstrate not only the principal characteristics of the Keyline system, but also for the evidence of Yeomans' early experiments which led to the perfection of that system. This evidence is not to be found on any other property.

The place possesses uncommon, rare or endangered aspects of the cultural or natural history of New South Wales.

Yobarnie is of state heritage significance as the site of the original development, implementation and demonstration of the Keyline system. Yobarnie is unique in preserving evidence of the early experimental stages in the development of that system. Such evidence of the sustainable transformation of natural landscapes by human agendas is rare in NSW and in Australia. These attributes have the potential to play a significant ongoing role in the cultural, recreational and economic life of the community.

The place is important in demonstrating the principal characteristics of a class of cultural or natural places/environments in New South Wales.

Yobarnie is of state heritage significance for its ability to demonstrate the interaction between topography and poor soil and the Keyline System, which created from this challenging environment the prototype of a viable agricultural landscape now represented worldwide.
