= Kurrajong Hills, New South Wales =

Kurrajong Hills New South Wales
- Coordinates: 33°32′S 150°39′E
- Population: 705 (2021 census)
- Postcode(s): 2758
- Elevation: 232 m (761 ft)
- Location: 76 km (47 mi) from Sydney CBD; 67 km (42 mi) from Lithgow
- LGA(s): City of Hawkesbury
- State electorate(s): Hawkesbury
- Federal division(s): Macquarie
Suburbs around Kurrajong Hills:
| Kurrajong Heights | Kurrajong Heights | Kurrajong |
| Kurrajong Heights | Kurrajong Hills | Kurrajong |
| Grose Vale | Kurmond | Kurmond |

Kurrajong Hills is a locality in the state of New South Wales, Australia. It is 76 kilometres north-west of Sydney, in the local government area of the City of Hawkesbury. It is north of the Bells Line of Road in the Blue Mountains, west of Kurrajong and east of Bilpin.

== History ==
Kurrajong Hills was previously known as Kurrajong North and Netley Hill. In 1927 Netley Hill Post Office, operated by Louisa Hearne, opened on the corner of Bells Line of Road and Hermitage Road. In 1938 the name was changed to North Kurrajong Post Office. It closed in 1968. In 1971 an attempt to officially name the area Netley Hill met with local opposition. The name Kurrajong Hills was settled on and assigned on 10 September 2004.

== Population ==
It had a population of 559 in the 2001 Census, growing to 629 in 2006, 639 in the 2011 Census and 705 in the 2021 Census.
