= North Richmond, New South Wales =

North Richmond
- Town
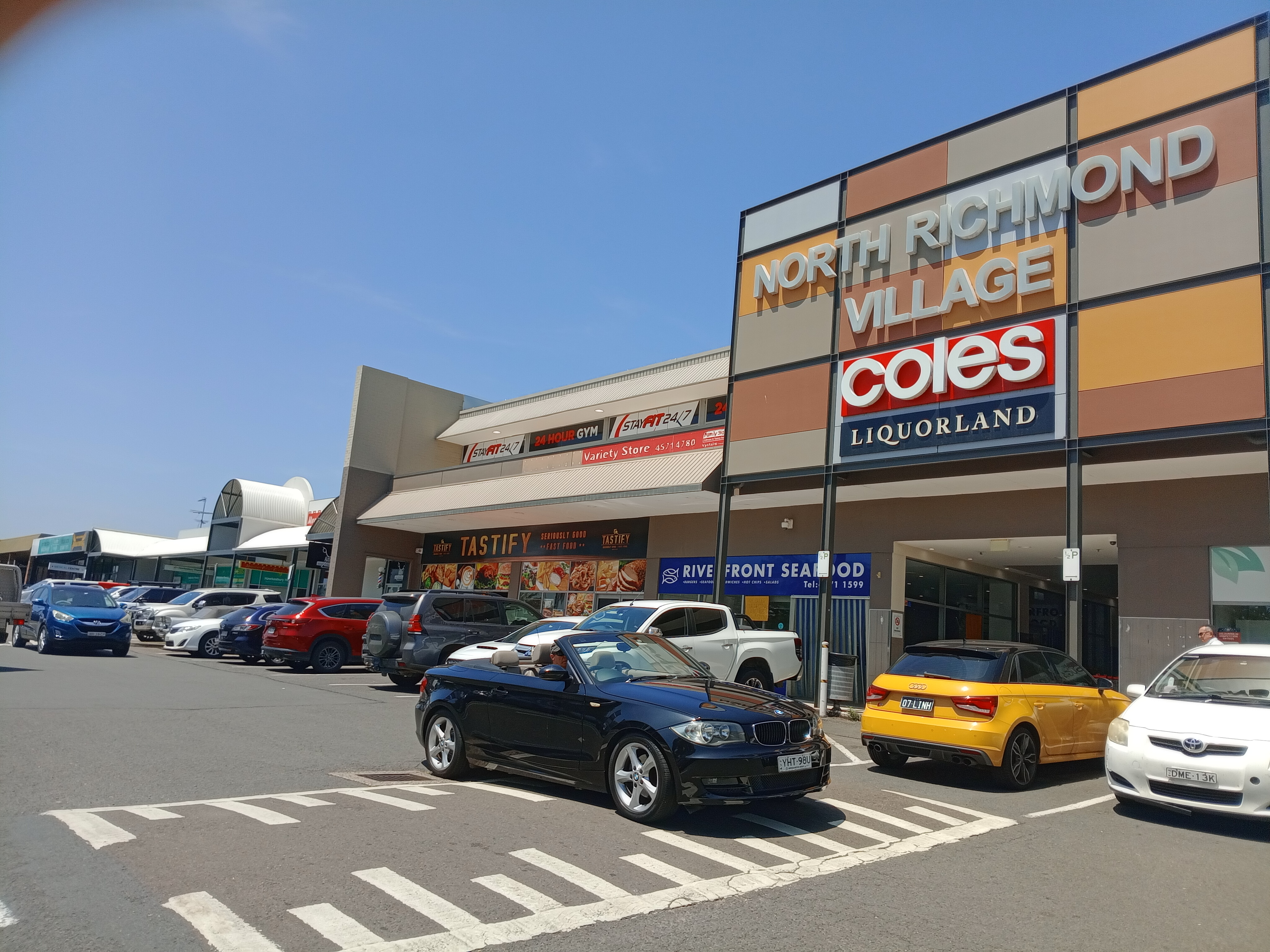
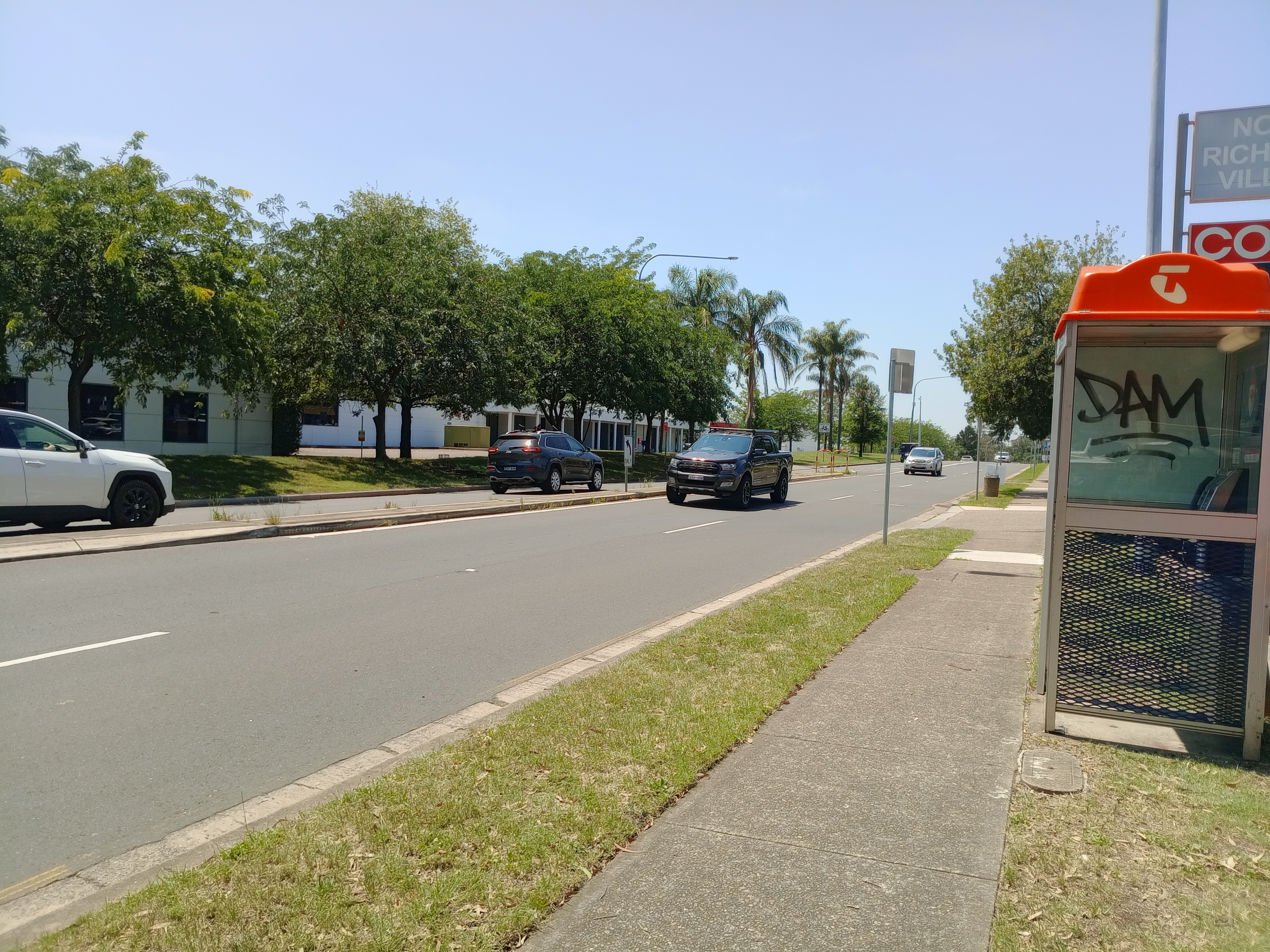
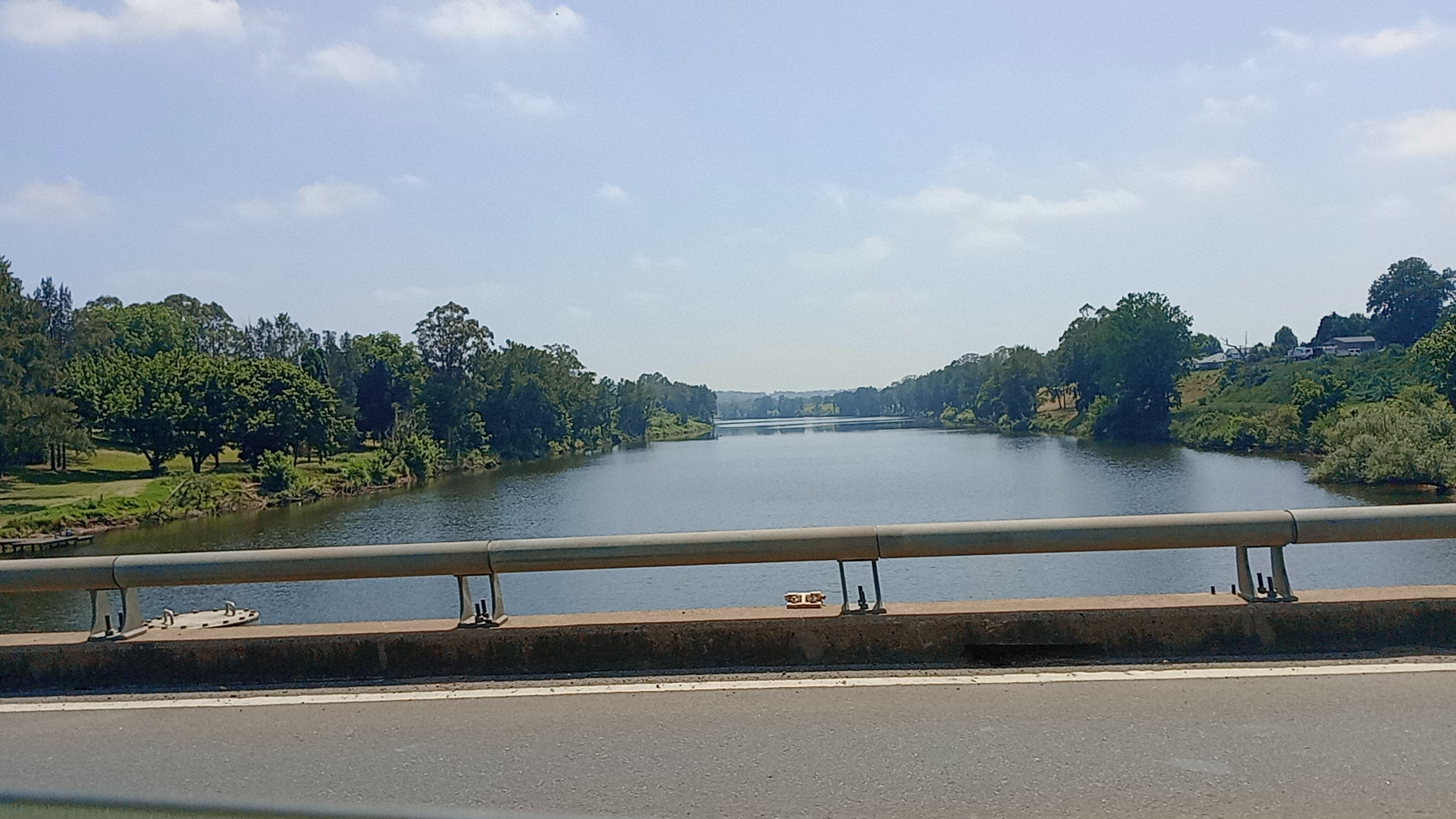
- North Richmond Shopping Village Bells Line of Road at North Richmond The Hawkesbury River near North Richmond

- Interactive map of North Richmond
- Coordinates: 33°35′21″S 150°42′40″E
- Country: Australia
- State: New South Wales
- LGA: Hawkesbury
- Location: 67 km (42 mi) north-west of Sydney CBD; 75 km (47 mi) east of Lithgow

Government
  - State electorate: Hawkesbury
  - Federal division: Macquarie
- Elevation: 27 m (89 ft)

Population
  - Total: 5,467 (UCL 2021)
- Postcode: 2754
Localities around North Richmond
| Kurrajong | Kurmond and Tennyson | Freemans Reach and Glossodia |
| Grose Vale | North Richmond | Richmond Lowlands |
| Grose Wold | Agnes Banks | Richmond |

North Richmond is a town in the state of New South Wales, Australia. North Richmond is located 67 kilometres (42 mi) north-west of Sydney in the local government area of the City of Hawkesbury. It is separated from the town of Richmond to its south-east by pasture land and the Hawkesbury River. North Richmond is not part of Sydney metropolitan area, however it is considered part of the Greater Sydney region.

== History ==
The traditional land owners of the town and surrounding district are the Darug people. In the early years of European Settlement, the area was known as Enfield. The name was changed at a later date during the 19th century to avoid confusion with Enfield in Sydney's west. While located to the west of the town of Richmond, it is thought to have been named North Richmond because it was north of Richmond Hill. This hill was named by Governor Philip when travelling up the Hawkesbury River in 1789.

In 1833 the "Woolpack Inn" was opened on higher ground near the river crossing, by John Town, a prominent local landowner. In 1874 the name changed to the "Travellers' Rest". In 1933 a more modern hotel was built next to the old inn and in 1940 was renamed the "North Richmond Hotel".

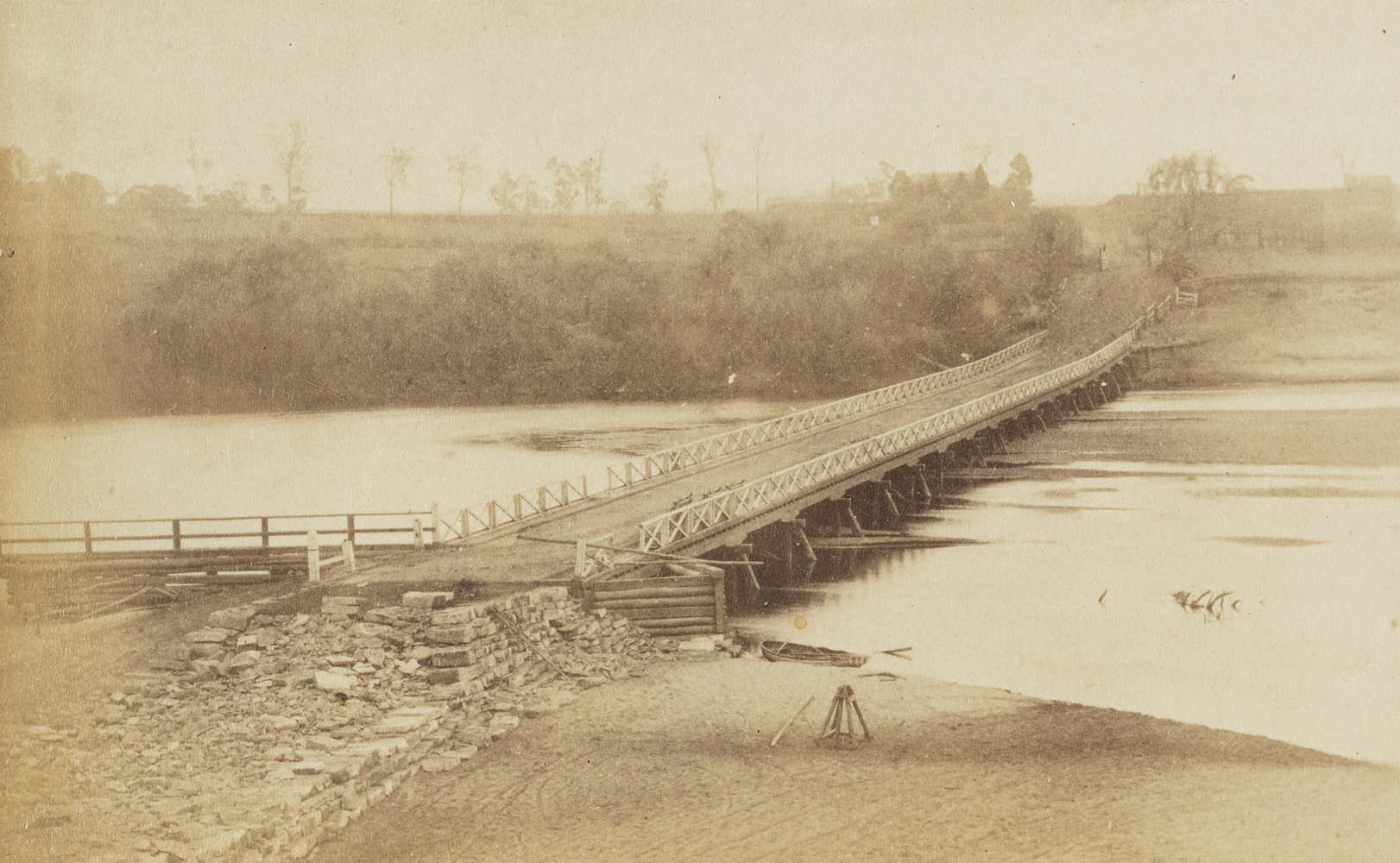
North Richmond bridge undergoing repairs, Sydney, ca. 1871

In the 1860s a wooden bridge was built across the Hawkesbury River to provide an easier crossing than the ferry or punt which had been used. In 1905 it was replaced by a higher-level bridge which was the largest reinforced concrete bridge to be constructed. It remained so for 20 years. In 1926 a railway branch line between Richmond and Kurrajong was opened. The railway bridge was built right next to the concrete bridge. The line curved to the right at the western end of the bridge before curving back around to cross Bells Line of Road at an angle near the intersection with Grose Vale Road. North Richmond had a railway station. When the line closed in 1952, the railway bridge became part of the roadway.

In addition to a hotel and public school, North Richmond also has a police station and a Wesleyan (Methodist) Chapel.

== Population ==
According to the 2021 census of Population, there were 6,358 people in North Richmond.

- Aboriginal and Torres Strait Islander people made up 4.6% of the population.
- 82.1% of people were born in Australia. The next most common country of birth was England at 3.8%.
- 89.0% of people spoke only English at home.
- The most common responses for religion were No Religion 32.6%, Catholic 23.9% and Anglican 20.8%.

== Amenities ==
There are three main parks in North Richmond, John Wellington Oval, Turnbull Oval and Inalls Lane. Cricket is played at John Wellington Oval and Turnbull Oval.

Soccer is played at Turnbull Oval and Inalls Lane. The Colo Cougars Soccer Club are based at Inalls Lane. A Panthers Club is located in North Richmond.

North Richmond has three main roads. These are Grose Vale Road, Bells Line of Road and Terrace Road. North Richmond has a shopping mall consisting of a supermarket and various shops and food outlets.

West of the town is the mountains and east is the Hawkesbury River

== Heritage listings ==
North Richmond has the following heritage listings:

- 108 Grose Vale Road: Yobarnie Keyline Farm

== Schools ==
Richmond North Public School on Grose Vale Road was established in 1871. It replaced the Church of England Denominational School which had operated at Enfield (as North Richmond was then known) for many years. Mr George Sanders, formally in charge of the Denominational School, was appointed the first teacher. The 1871 building was demolished to make way for new school buildings in the mid-1960s. Colo High School was established in 1978 in demountable buildings at North Richmond. The current permanent site was occupied in 1980. The blue and white colours were chosen to match colours selected by the Uniform Committee. Mr Sam Weller, the school's first Deputy Principal, suggested using the school building plan as a basis for the logo. Mr David Stone, founding Mathematics teacher, drew up the design which was accepted as the school badge. The shape also represents the Tree Of Knowledge, and its three sections, Students, Staff and the Community.

== Transport Links ==
North Richmond is served by 3 bus routes operated by Busways, which all go to Richmond Station

Route 668 Richmond to Windsor via Glossodia and Freemans Reach

Route 680 Richmond to Grose Vale (Loop Service)

Route 682 Richmond to Kurrajong or Berambing
