= Grose Vale =

- Suburb
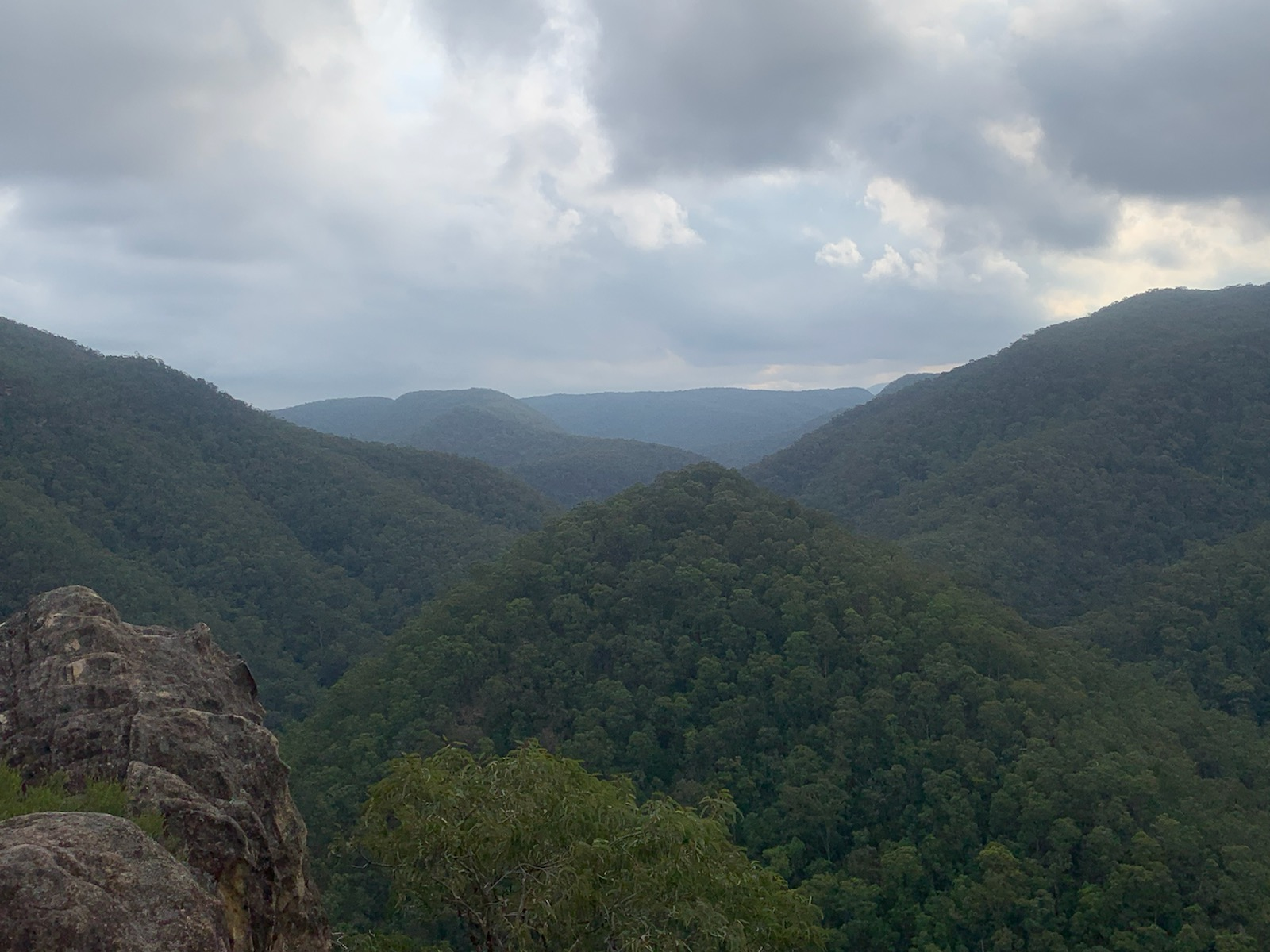
- View from Cabbage Tree lookout, located in Grose Vale

- Interactive map of Grose Vale
- Coordinates: 33°35′2″S 150°40′26″E
- Country: Australia
- State: New South Wales
- City: Sydney
- LGA: City of Hawkesbury
- Location: 71.5 km (44.4 mi) from Sydney CBD

Government
  - State electorate: Hawkesbury
  - Federal division: Macquarie
- Elevation: 128 m (420 ft)

Population
  - Total: 1,272 (2021 census)
- Postcode: 2753
Suburbs around Grose Vale
Kurrajong Heights	Kurrajong Hills	Kurrajong and Kurmond
Bowen Mountain	Grose Vale	North Richmond
Bilpin	Grose Wold	Grose Wold

Grose Vale is a suburb of Sydney, in the state of New South Wales, Australia. It is located in the City of Hawkesbury. It was previously known as South Kurrajong. Many historic properties are located in Grose Vale including "Lemon Forest" originally owned by the Lamrock family as well as a number of homes owned by the Dunston and Ezzy families.

== Population ==
In the 2021 census, Grose Vale recorded a population of 1,272 people. 83.3% of people were born in Australia and 90.1% of people spoke only English at home. The most common responses for religion in Grose Vale were Catholic 32.5%, No Religion 31.6% and Anglican 18.4%.

== Geography ==
The suburb consists of mostly semi-rural properties around 5 to 10 acres (40,000 m^{2}) in size. Entry into the suburb is via Grose Vale Road running from Grose Wold to the East, and the village of Kurrajong to the North.

== Amenities ==
The suburb has no footpaths and only sparse street-lighting. The parts of Grose Vale nearest Kurrajong have town water and/or sewer lines. The majority of residents use tank water, either from rainfall or trucked in using tankers. Waste is disposed of using septic tanks and absorption trenches.

Amenities are provided at the junction of Grose Vale Road and Grose Wold Road (West) in the form of a small general store and petrol station (gas station), a post office, a hairdresser, a bus-stop and a public telephone. NB: as of April 2013, the general store and gas station were closed and the premises on the market. The new owners have completely redeveloped the store and installed new petrol tanks and established a brand new petrol station that now trades as Lucky 7. The new store has also integrated the post office inside. The nearest grocery stores are now approximately a 7-minute-drive away at either Kurrajong (small family-owned supermarket) or North Richmond (Aldi and Coles).

Grose Vale has a government primary (elementary) school, Grose View Public School, a community centre hall, a rural fire station located on Cabbage Tree Road, and is served by a Cub and Scout Pack.

Telephone and power lines run above ground, and due to the hilly somewhat-exposed terrain and number of trees, power failures are not uncommon during stormy weather. Broadband internet supply uses ADSL2, with the Telstra telephone exchange located near the general store.

Subscription television is by satellite only. Cable television does not yet run to Grose Vale.

== Wildlife ==
The Blue Mountains national park opens to the south and west of the suburb, and brings many forms of native fauna to the residents. Wallabies are common, as are the Australian king parrot, the kookaburra, the rosella, the rainbow lorikeet, the bellbird, the galah, and the cockatoo.

== Climate ==
Winters can drop to below zero (32 °F) but this is not common. Daytime summer temperatures can reach into the mid 40s (110 + F) and if coupled with low humidity and a strong NW wind the suburb is exposed to an extreme risk of bushfires.
