= Cornwallis, New South Wales =

Place in New South Wales, Australia

Cornwallis
- Suburb
- Interactive map of Cornwallis
- Coordinates: 33°35′31″S 150°48′43″E
- Country: Australia
- State: New South Wales
- City: Sydney
- LGA: City of Hawkesbury
- Location: 63.5 km (39.5 mi) from Sydney CBD

Government
  - State electorate: Hawkesbury
  - Federal division: Macquarie
- Elevation: 9 m (30 ft)

Population
  - Total: 44 (2021 census)
- Postcode: 2756
Suburbs around Cornwallis
Richmond Lowlands	Freemans Reach	Freemans Reach
Richmond	Cornwallis	Freemans Reach
Clarendon	Windsor	Windsor

Cornwallis is a suburb of Sydney, in the state of New South Wales, Australia. It is located in the City of Hawkesbury north-west of Windsor. Cornwallis is bounded in the north and the east by the Hawkesbury River.
