= Glossodia, New South Wales =

Coordinates: 33°32′04″S 150°46′56″E

Glossodia
- Suburb
- Coordinates
- Country: Australia
- State: New South Wales
- City: Sydney
- LGA: City of Hawkesbury
- Location: 68 km (42 mi) north-west of Sydney CBD

Government
  - State electorate: Hawkesbury
  - Federal division: Macquarie
- Elevation: 51 m (167 ft)

Population
  - Total: 2,865 (2021 census)
- Postcode: 2756
Suburbs around Glossodia
East Kurrajong and Tennyson	East Kurrajong	East Kurrajong and Wilberforce
Tennyson	Glossodia	Wilberforce
North Richmond	Freemans Reach	Freemans Reach and Wilberforce

Glossodia is a small town in the state of New South Wales, Australia. Glossodia is located 68 kilometres north-west of the Sydney central business district in the local government area of the City of Hawkesbury.

== History ==
Glossodia was formerly known as "Currency Creek" and its name was changed in 1922. The name Glossodia originates from a small genus of mostly purple orchids from Australia, which grow in the area.

== Population ==
According to the 2021 census, there were 2,865 residents in Glossodia. 89.1% of people were born in Australia and 93.2% of people spoke only English at home. The most common ancestries were Australian 46.2%, English 43.1%, Scottish 9.5%, Maltese 9.2% and Irish 9.0%. The most common responses for religion were No Religion 39.0%, Catholic 26.8% and Anglican 20.3%.

== Landmarks ==
The suburb is home to Glossodia Public School. The area includes a day care centre, Community Centre, shops, and soccer fields, all within walking distance of the school. It is also the location of the Sydney Guide Dog Centre.
