= Blaxlands Ridge =

- Suburb
- Coordinates: 33°30′7″S 150°42′43″E
- Country: Australia
- State: New South Wales
- City: Sydney
- LGA: City of Hawkesbury
- Location: 74 km (46 mi) from Sydney CBD

Government
  - State electorate: Hawkesbury
  - Federal division: Macquarie
- Elevation: 116 m (381 ft)

Population
  - Total: 464 (2011 census)
- Postcode: 2758
Suburbs around Blaxlands Ridge
Bilpin	Colo Heights	Cumberland Reach
Bilpin	Blaxlands Ridge	Cumberland Reach
Kurrajong	East Kurrajong	East Kurrajong

Blaxlands Ridge is a suburb in northwest Sydney of the state of New South Wales, Australia. The suburb is located near Richmond and is located in the City of Hawkesbury local government area. Blaxlands Ridge is located 74 kilometres (46 mi) northwest of the Sydney CBD.
