= The Slopes, New South Wales =

The Slopes
- Suburb
- Coordinates: 32°31′55″S 150°42′29″E
- Country: Australia
- State: New South Wales
- City: Sydney
- LGA: City of Hawkesbury
- Location: 72 km (45 mi) from Sydney CBD

Government
  - State electorate: Hawkesbury
  - Federal division: Macquarie
- Elevation: 169 m (554 ft)

Population
  - Total: 327 (2021 census)
- Postcode: 2754
Suburbs around The Slopes
Kurrajong	East Kurrajong	East Kurrajong
Kurrajong	The Slopes	Tennyson
Kurrajong	Kurmond	Kurmond

The Slopes is a town 72 km north west of Sydney in the state of New South Wales, Australia. It is located in the City of Hawkesbury in the foothills of the Blue Mountains. It is situated east of Kurrajong, west of Tennyson, south of East Kurrajong, and north of Kurmond.

In the 2021 census, it recorded a population of 327 people. Their median age was 45 years, compared to the national median of 38 years.
