= East Kurrajong =

- Suburb
- Coordinates: 33°30′55″S 150°46′04″E
- Country: Australia
- State: New South Wales
- LGA: City of Hawkesbury
- Location: 74 km (46 mi) from Sydney CBD

Government
  - State electorate: Hawkesbury
  - Federal division: Macquarie
- Elevation: 93 m (305 ft)

Population
  - Total: 2,203 (2021 census)
- Postcode: 2758
- Annual rainfall: 800 mm (31 in)
Suburbs around East Kurrajong
Kurrajong	Blaxlands Ridge	Lower Portland
Kurrajong	East Kurrajong	Sackville
The Slopes	Glossodia and Tennyson	Ebenezer and Wilberforce

East Kurrajong is a suburb located in the north-west Sydney basin, in the state of New South Wales, Australia. It is located in the City of Hawkesbury north of Glossodia and east of Kurrajong.

The suburb extends along a single ridge for 16 km from the foot of the Blue Mountains in the west almost to the Hawkesbury River in the east. The ridge is bounded by Roberts Creek to the north and Howes Creek to the south.

The geology of the ridge is sandstone, capped intermittently with shale. Elevation ranges from a little above sea level to approximately 140 m. The vegetation type is Cumberland Plain dry sclerophyll forest and eucalypt woodland.

The East Kurrajong School of Arts Community Hall is a central location for community events.

== Population ==
In the 2021 Census, there were 2,203 people in East Kurrajong, a minor increase on 2016 census. There were more males than females (51.4/48.6%) and the median age was 38. 88.8% of residents were born in Australia, well above the Australian average. The most common responses for religion were No Religion 34.4%, Catholic 29.7% and Anglican 21.8%. English was the only language spoken at home for 95.1% of respondents.
