= Grose Wold =

- Suburb
- Interactive map of Grose Wold
- Coordinates: 33°35′55″S 150°41′05″E
- Country: Australia
- State: New South Wales
- City: Sydney
- LGA: City of Hawkesbury
- Location: 70 km (43 mi) from Sydney CBD

Government
  - Federal division: Macquarie
- Elevation: 37 m (121 ft)

Population
  - Total: 668 (2021 census)
- Postcode: 2753
Suburbs around Grose Wold
| Grose Vale | Grose Vale | North Richmond |
| Grose Vale | Grose Wold | Richmond |
| Yarramundi | Yarramundi | Agnes Banks |

Grose Wold is a suburb of Sydney, in the state of New South Wales, Australia. It is in the City of Hawkesbury. At the 2021 census, Grose Wold's population was 668.

RedBank North Richmond has proposed building a bridge through Grose Wold to Yarramundi to get to Penrith quicker and ease traffic and congestion on the North Richmond bridge to Richmond.
