= Kurrajong Heights, New South Wales =

Kurrajong Heights New South Wales
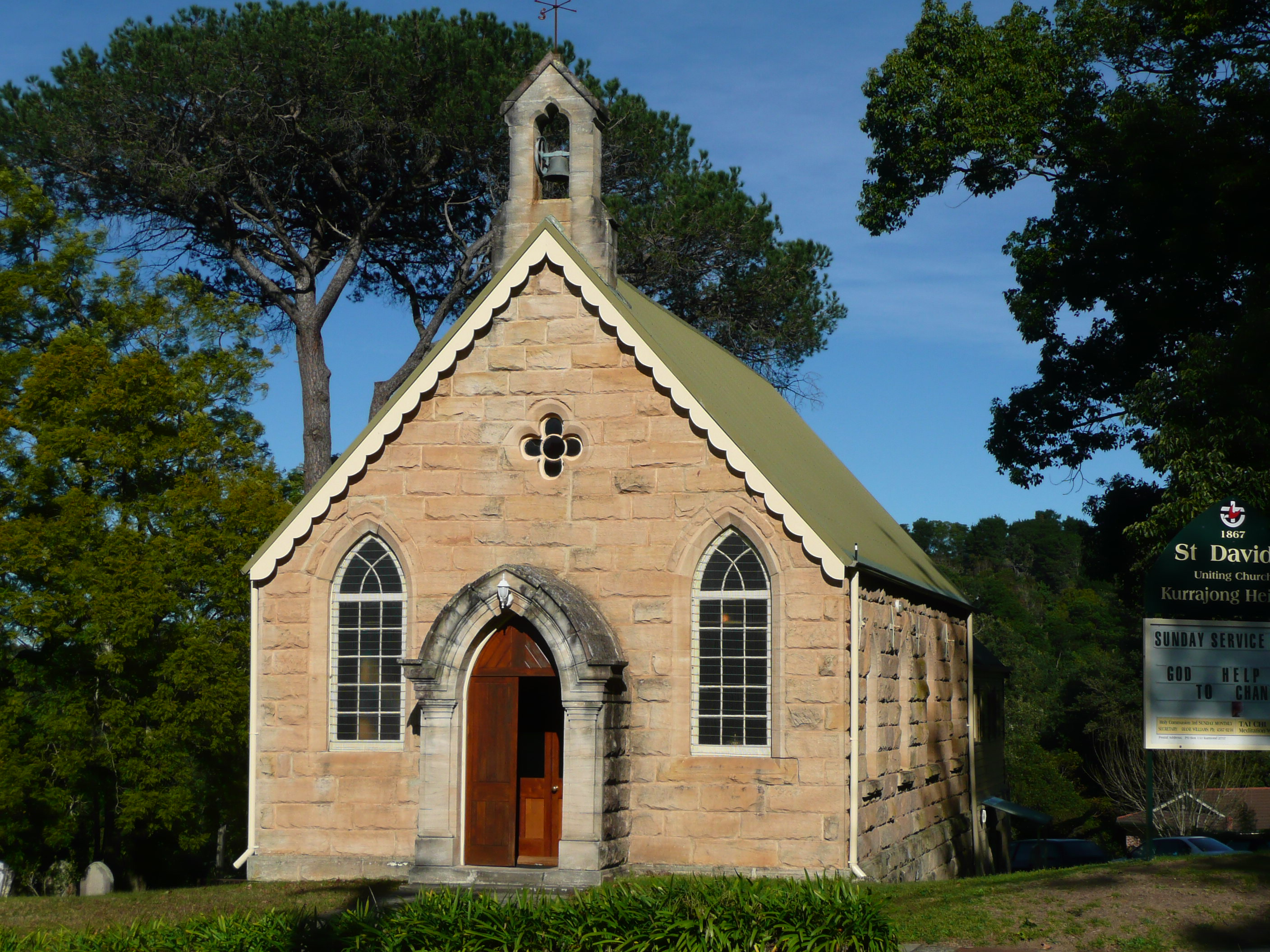
- St David's church

- Coordinates: 33°33′S 150°40′E
- Population: 1,342 (2016 census census)
- Postcode(s): 2758
- Elevation: 495 m (1,624 ft)
- Location: 79 km (49 mi) north-west of Sydney CBD; 61 km (38 mi) east of Lithgow
- LGA(s): City of Hawkesbury
- State electorate(s): Hawkesbury
- Federal division(s): Macquarie
Suburbs around Kurrajong Heights:
| Bilpin | Bilpin | Kurrajong |
| Bilpin | Kurrajong Heights | Kurrajong |
| Bilpin | Grose Vale | Kurrajong Hills |

Kurrajong Heights is a small town in the state of New South Wales, Australia. Kurrajong Heights is 79 kilometres (49 mi) north-west of Sydney, in the local government area of the City of Hawkesbury. It is stretched across the Bells Line of Road in the Blue Mountains, west of Kurrajong and east of Bilpin. At the 2016 census, Kurrajong Heights had a population of 1,342 people.

Kurrajong Heights has five communications towers that house two-way radio equipment for Integral Energy and Hawkesbury City Council and various other uses. Local community radio station Hawkesbury Radio transmits from Kurrajong Heights.

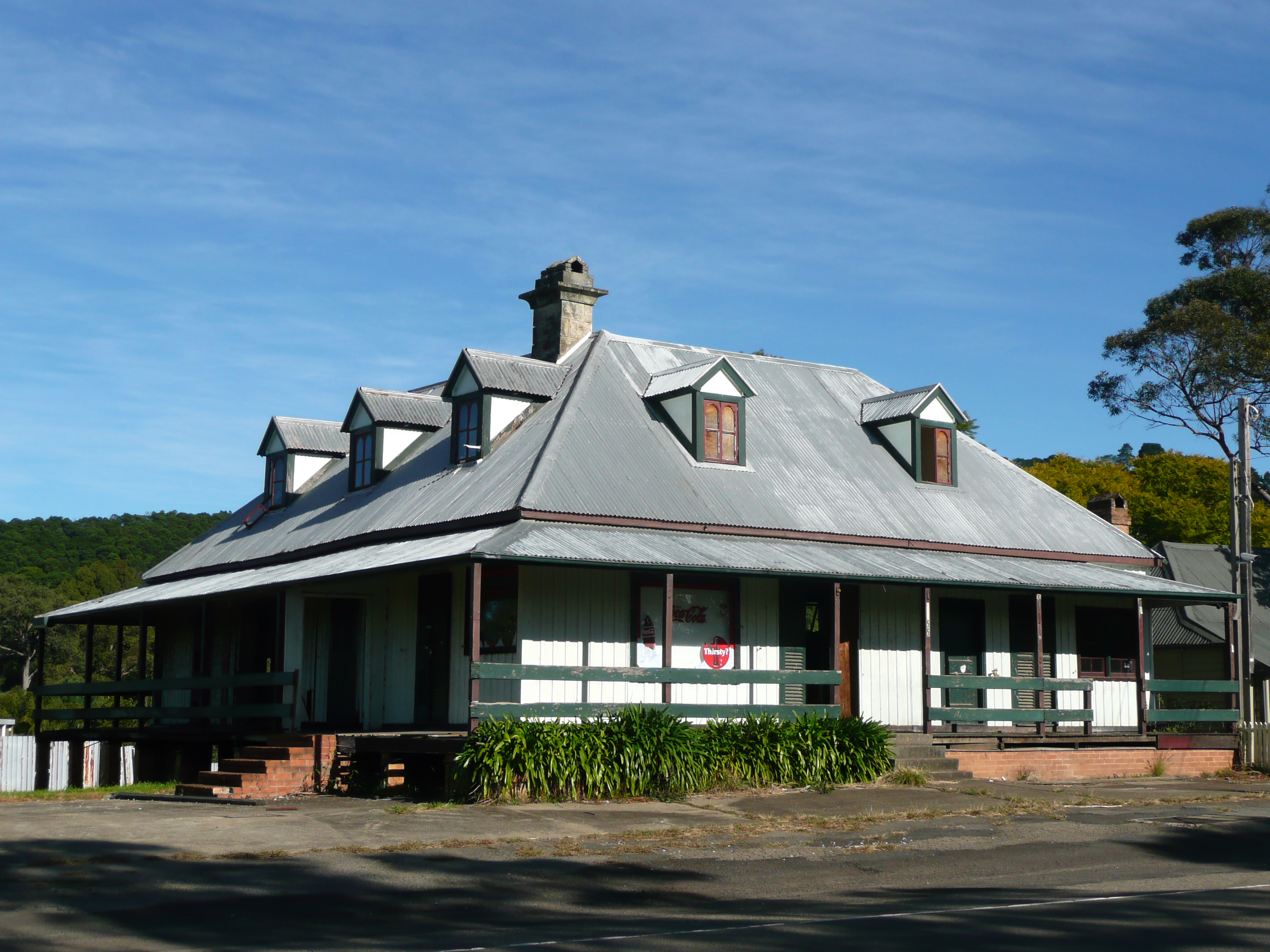
Old Post Office

== History ==
First discovered in 1795 by explorer Matthew Everingham. Although credit is usually attributed to Archibald Bell, Jr. as he was the first European to cross the mountains via this route; now known as Bells Line of Road. Kurrajong Heights was previously known as Northfield. Lochiel House, built in 1825 by former convict Joseph Douglass from Dumfries, Scotland. The old post office was opened in the 1860s. St David's Church was built in 1867. These significant buildings can still be seen on Bells Line of Road. In 1926, the railway line was extended from Richmond to Kurrajong after years of petitioning from the local orchardists. The railway line was closed in 1952.

== Population ==
In the 2016 Census, there were 1,342 people in Kurrajong Heights. 78.2% of people were born in Australia and 87.7% of people spoke only English at home. The most common responses for religion were No Religion 32.8%, Anglican 19.6% and Catholic 19.5%.

== Local events ==
The area contains craft stores, B&B style accommodation and restaurants. There are "pick your own fruit" orchards, offering stone fruit, apples, and nuts.

In early June, teams compete in the annual Back to Back (shearing a sheep and knitting a jumper in one day) at Turpentine Tree.

In early October, Madison's Mountain Retreat (a local farmstay) hosts its alpaca shearing day.

At the end of December, there is the open day at the Tutti Fruitti Rose Farm.
