= Kurmond =

- Suburb
- Interactive map of Kurmond
- Coordinates: 33°33′4″S 150°41′24″E
- Country: Australia
- State: New South Wales
- City: Sydney
- LGA: City of Hawkesbury
- Location: 70.5 km (43.8 mi) from Sydney CBD; 70.5 km (43.8 mi) from Lithgow

Government
  - State electorate: Hawkesbury
  - Federal division: Macquarie
- Elevation: 136 m (446 ft)

Population
  - Total: 850 (2021 census)
- Postcode: 2757
Suburbs around Kurmond
| Kurrajong Hills | Kurrajong | The Slopes |
| Grose Vale | Kurmond | North Richmond |
| Grose Vale | Grose Vale | North Richmond |

Kurmond is a village 70.5 km west of Sydney, in the state of New South Wales, Australia. It is located in the City of Hawkesbury between Kurrajong and North Richmond on Bells Line of Road.

In the 2021 census, Kurmond recorded a population of 850 people. It has a small shopping centre including a post office, with two restaurants further east to North Richmond (all located on Bells Line of Road)

In his memoir From Kurmond Kid to Cancer Crusader, oncologist Fred Stephens describes growing up on a soldier settler block at Kurmond in the 1930s. The area was well known at that time for its orchards and soldier settlement houses. The village has one school, Kurmond Public School.

Kurmond was home to the original Airlite windows factory in the 1960s.

Notable residents include F.B Mackenzie, who was a local orchardist and advocate for farmer and community issues in the area. Prime Minister Ben Chifley would often stop at the Mackenzie farm on his way home to Bathurst (at that time Kurmond was in his electorate). Rowley McMahon founded a bus company after walking home from the then Grose Vale train station at the end of World War II which went on to become Westbus.

Originally known as Longleat, the name "Kurmond" is a portmanteau of neighboring town names Kurrajong and Richmond.
