= Freemans Reach =

- Suburb
- Interactive map of Freemans Reach
- Coordinates: 33°33′41″S 150°47′52″E
- Country: Australia
- State: New South Wales
- LGA: City of Hawkesbury
- Location: 65 km (40 mi) north-west of Sydney CBD

Government
  - State electorate: Hawkesbury
  - Federal division: Macquarie
- Elevation: 35 m (115 ft)

Population
  - Total: 2,049 (2021 census)
- Postcode: 2756
Suburbs around Freemans Reach
Glossodia	Glossodia	Glossodia and Wilberforce
North Richmond	Freemans Reach	Wilberforce
Richmond Lowlands	Cornwallis	Wilberforce and Windsor

Freemans Reach is a town in New South Wales, Australia. Freemans Reach is located 65 kilometres north-west of Sydney in the local government area of the City of Hawkesbury. It is bounded in the south by the Hawkesbury River.

== Population ==
In the 2021 Census, there were 2,049 people in Freemans Reach. 84.2% of people were born in Australia and 89.4% of people spoke only English at home, with the most common ancestries being Australian 41.4%, English 37.2%, Maltese 13.7%, Irish 10.6% and Scottish 8.9%. The most common responses for religion were Catholic 32.0%, No Religion 31.6% and Anglican 18.8%.
