= Tennyson, New South Wales =

Tennyson
- Suburb
- Coordinates: 33°32′13″S 150°44′15″E
- Country: Australia
- State: New South Wales
- LGA: City of Hawkesbury
- Location: 72 km (45 mi) north-west of Sydney CBD

Government
  - State electorate: Hawkesbury
  - Federal division: Macquarie
- Elevation: 63 m (207 ft)

Population
  - Total: 379 (2021 census)
- Postcode: 2754
Suburbs around Tennyson
East Kurrajong	East Kurrajong	Glossodia
The Slopes	Tennyson	Glossodia
Kurmond	North Richmond	Glossodia

Tennyson is a semi-rural suburb of Sydney, in New South Wales, Australia. It is located 72 kilometres north-west of the Sydney central business district in the local government area of the City of Hawkesbury.

In the 2021 census, Tennyson recorded a population of 379.

== Landmarks ==
Tennyson is home to Tennyson Volunteer Bush Fire Brigade, part of the NSW Rural Fire Service. The Tennyson Bush Fire Brigade shed is the only community building in Tennyson, and hence is a community meeting point for the Tennyson Water Scheme and, on occasion, parliamentary elections.
