= Kurrajong, New South Wales =

Kurrajong
- Town
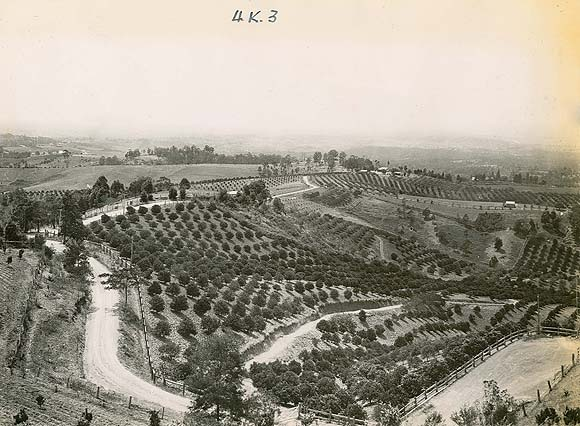
- Historical photograph of local citrus orchards from Records Authority of New South Wales

- Coordinates: 33°33′S 150°40′E
- Country: Australia
- State: New South Wales
- City: Sydney
- LGA: City of Hawkesbury
- Location: 75 km (47 mi) NW of Sydney; 8 km (5.0 mi) NW of Richmond; 69 km (43 mi) ESE of Lithgow

Government
  - State electorate: Hawkesbury
  - Federal division: Macquarie
- Elevation: 150 m (490 ft)

Population
  - Total: 3,113 (2021 census)
- Postcode: 2758
Localities around Kurrajong
Kurrajong Heights	Bilpin	Blaxlands Ridge
Kurrajong Hills	Kurrajong	The Slopes
Grose Vale	Grose Vale	Kurmond

Kurrajong is a small town in New South Wales, Australia. Kurrajong is located 75 kilometres (47 mi) north-west of Sydney, in the local government area of the City of Hawkesbury.

Kurrajong is located to the west of the Hawkesbury River on the lower slopes of the Blue Mountains. It is 8 kilometres (5 mi) north-west of Richmond on the Bells Line of Road, with Kurrajong Hills and Kurrajong Heights further west on this road.

== History ==
Kurrajong is a popular destination for tourists who enjoy the village's peaceful atmosphere and attractive natural surrounds.

Kurrajong is an Aboriginal name for several species of Australian trees in the genus Brachychiton, which once grew in abundance in the area. The bark fibres were used to make fishing nets, ropes and baskets.

The area is on traditional Dharug land and was first settled by Europeans around 1790, not long after Governor Phillip had travelled down the Hawkesbury River in search of suitable farming land for the struggling colony. As early as 1795 an attempt to find a route through the mountains had been made but it was not until 1823, that Archibald Bell, following Aboriginal women escaping from the Springwood tribe which had kidnapped them, discovered a suitable route. By 1841 the convict built road through Kurrajong, named Bell's Line of Road, was opened. The present road, with easier grades, was opened in 1901.

William Lawson was given a grant of 500 acres (2.0 km^{2}) near Wheeny Creek in 1810, but never lived there. Together with Gregory Blaxland and William Charles Wentworth, Lawson made a successful crossing of the Blue Mountains in 1813, which is now the major road to the west – the Great Western Highway. The oldest settlement was along Comleroy Road, which from about 1819 had been the main road north from Sydney to the Hunter Valley. In 1827 it was described as nothing but a bridle track and used chiefly to drove cattle to the new settlements in the Hunter River Valley.

Former convicts David Hawkins and Job Wilson each owned 50 acres near present-day Hermitage Road. Hawkins named his property 'Timberinga' while Wilson called his 'Rocklands'. Along with the Davis and Peck families, these convicts were the Grandfathers of many Australians. Prime Minister Malcolm Turnbull is a descendant of Joseph Davis, through Joseph's daughter Sarah. Sarah's two brothers married two of David Hawkins's daughters while another brother George married Job Wilson's daughter Elizabeth. Many descendants still live in Kurrajong.

In the 1820s and 1830s, the notorious bushranger Jack Donahoe and his gang terrorised the settlers and travellers of Kurrajong and Richmond. Victims were robbed and sometimes stripped naked and their horse stolen, left to get home as best they could. A Mr. Harrington, living near Kurmond, was shot and killed in his home by gang member, George Armstrong.

Several inns catered for locals and travellers along Bells Line of Road. One was the "Goldfinder's Rest", established in 1851 and run by John Lamrock. It was used by those going to the Turon diggings. About 1870 it became a Post Office and Store. The original building still exists beside Little Wheeney Creek and is a private residence.

As more settlers moved into the area it was found to be suitable for the growing of fruit trees and the Kurrajong area became renowned for its orchards. By the late 19th century orchardists and others were lobbying the government to extend the railway from Richmond to Kurrajong so that they could get their produce to market more easily. The lobbying eventually paid off, and in 1926 the branch line from Richmond was opened.

However, by the time the line was opened, the orchardists had begun to use trucks and the line was never economically viable. Landslides gave an excuse for the line to close in 1952. At the time the nearest High School was in Richmond and even today many people remember going to school on the train, which was known as Pansy.

During the 1920s and 1930s, the district contained many guest houses, especially along Comleroy Road. The scenery and natural environment attracted many city people for a stay in the country. The Kurrajong Heights Hotel, a building with panoramic views towards the coast, was opened in 1928 but destroyed by fire in 1975. The 1950s and 60s saw a decline in local tourism as people began to travel further afield for their holidays, in cars and planes. Kurrajong's orchards also began to decline and many properties were subdivided into smaller acreages. Horses and cows grazed on the paddocks once covered by fruit trees.

For a number of years, in October, Kurrajong attracted many visitors to its locally renowned "Scarecrow Festival". The festival has not run for over 2 years due to internal disagreements in the local Scarecrow Festival Committee.

Today there is a revival in Kurrajong. The scenery and rural tranquility has made it a sought after location for people wanting an escape from the bustle of life in the city. Many people have purchased small acreages as hobby farms or rural retreats. There is also a revival of guest accommodation, as the pressures of modern work have meant that people want a weekend away that is only a short drive from their homes.

== Heritage listings ==
Kurrajong has a number of heritage-listed sites, including:

- 164 Old Bells Line of Road: Goldfinders Inn

== Population ==
At the 2021 census, there were 3,113 people in Kurrajong. 83.4% of people were born in Australia. The next most common country of birth was England at 4.2%. 91.7% of people spoke only English at home. The most common responses for religion were No Religion 35.2%, Catholic 25.2% and Anglican 21.6%.

At the 2011 census, Kurrajong had 3,123 people.

== Transport ==
For 26 years, Kurrajong was connected to Richmond by a railway, with the train locally known as "Pansy". The shops known as "Pansy Junction" are near the railway station site, which now has an electricity substation on it. The line was closed in 1952, following landslide damage. There are some remains of this railway in the form of several cuttings located at various places along the line. The Goods shed at Kurrajong station is now part of the Australiana Pioneer Village in Rose St, Wilberforce. There is also the remains of a small wooden platform on private property. There were plans to rebuild and reopen the railway as a tourist attraction by the "Tourist Railway Association Kurrajong", but this did not eventuate.

An infrequent bus service operates from Richmond Station, but the most convenient way to get to Kurrajong is by car.

== Commercial area ==
Businesses in the area include restaurants, cafes, estate agents, butchers, grocers, greengrocers, pharmacies, newsagents and post offices. Kurrajong Village is widely known for its fresh locally sourced produce.

== Education ==
=== High schools ===
- Colo High School
- Kuyper Christian School

=== Primary schools ===
- Kurrajong Public School
- Grose View Public School
- Kuyper Christian School
- Kurrajong North Public School
- Hawkesbury Independent School
- Comleroy Road Public School

== Churches ==
- St Gregory's Catholic Church Est. 1834 Old Bells Line of Road, Kurrajong
- St Stephen's Anglican Church Est. 1869 1005 Grose Vale Road, Kurrajong
- Church of Christ 56 Old Bells Line of Road, Kurrajong
- Kurrajong Baptist Church 66 Kurrajong Road, Kurrajong
