= Bilpin, New South Wales =

Bilpin
- Suburb
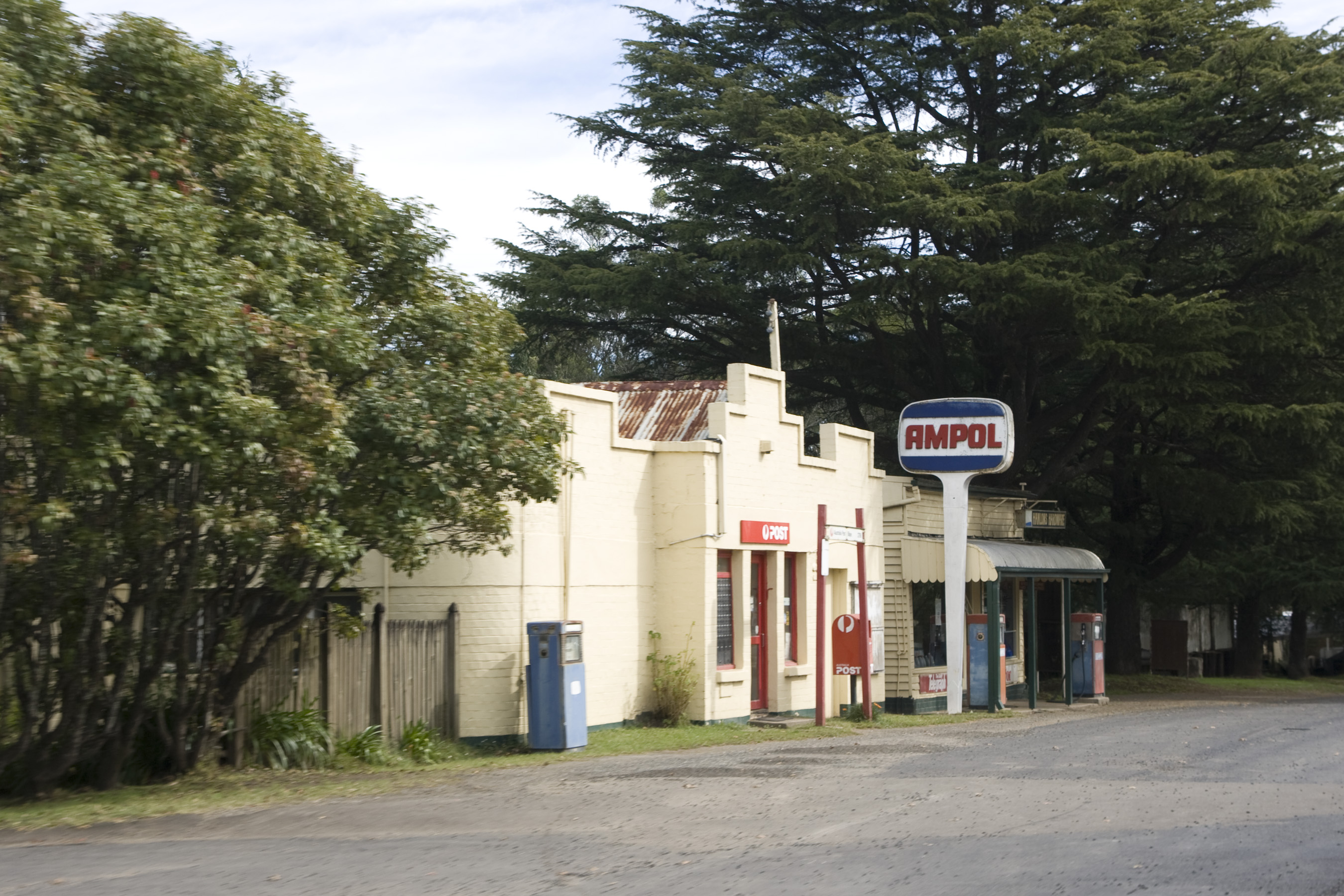
- Bilpin Post Office

- Coordinates: 33°29′53″S 150°31′19″E
- Country: Australia
- State: New South Wales
- LGA: City of Hawkesbury
- Location: 90 km (56 mi) from Sydney CBD; 51 km (32 mi) from Lithgow

Government
  - State electorate: Hawkesbury
  - Federal division: Macquarie
- Elevation: 623 m (2,044 ft)

Population
  - Total: 653 (2021 census)
- Postcode: 2758
Suburbs around Bilpin
Blue Mountains National Park	Blue Mountains National Park	Mountain Lagoon
Warawaralong	Bilpin	Kurrajong Heights
Grose Valley	Blue Mountains National Park	Kurrajong Hills

Bilpin is a small town on the historic Bells Line of Road in the City of Hawkesbury local government area in the Blue Mountains, west of Sydney, New South Wales.

Bilpin is known as "Land of the Mountain Apple". Fruit orchards and gardens thrive in the fertile soil and the road is lined with roadside stalls selling home-made produce, especially during summer. Bilpin apples and Bilpin apple juice are well-known around Australia.

According to RP Data, Bilpin is the 'most loyal' suburb in the Sydney area, with locals staying for an average of 21 years in the same house.

== History ==
Opinions differ as whether Bilpin is in Dharug or Darkingung land, although Gregory Blaxland differentiated between the 'plains natives' (Dharug) and the 'Branch natives of the mountains'(Darkingung). Bilpin is an Aboriginal word which may mean "mountain". Pulpin was an Aboriginal guide in 1816 and his name may also be a source of Bilpin's name. In 1823 a young man of just 19, Archibald Bell, was shown the route from Richmond to Mount Tomah through what is now Bilpin by Darug men Emery and Cogy. On a second trip in 1823 he found a way across to what is now Lithgow. There is no evidence in Archibald Bell's journal to suggest that he was shown the way across by an Aboriginal woman who had been kidnapped. In March 1834 the surveyor, Felton Mathew, accompanied by his wife, camped "at Bilpen a farm of Mr Howell's"

Children's author, Hesba Brinsmead, was brought up in Bilpin and wrote several books set in the region, including Longtime Passing (1971), for which she won the Children's Book Council of Australia award. Meredyth Hungerford (a relative of Hesba Brinsmead) was another local author, writing "Bilpin: the Apple Country" and "Exploring the Blue Mountains".

== Activities ==
Bilpin Community Hall is the centre of Bilpin life. It hosts a Farmer's Market on every Saturday morning between ten and twelve, as well as the annual Spring Flower show; the Mount Wilson to Bilpin Bush Run in August (which aids the Bilpin Bush Fire Brigade); and an annual quilt exhibition. The Bilpin preschool operates within the hall, as do community groups such as the Gardening Club, the Farmers' Association and the Quilting Club.

Bilpin has a small school which was opened in 1927. In 2015 it had 67 students. It has vegetable gardens and a chicken coop, and has a partnership with the local Environmental Education Centre.

Bilpin Coaches picks up local children and drops them off at Bilpin school each morning and afternoon and runs additional services for other local schools. Hawkesbury Community Transport offers a bus service to Richmond weekly for seniors and others with mobility needs.

Bilpin is now known as a tourist destination, with roadside stalls and orchards where visitors can pick their own fruit. These include Pine Crest Orchard, and The Bilpin Fruit Bowl, which has the world's largest fruit bowl, a roadside attraction.

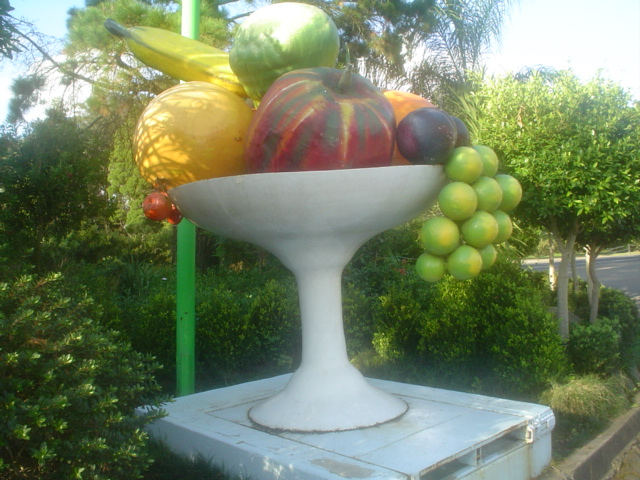
World's largest bowl at Bilpin

== Demographics ==
At the 2021 census, Bilpin recorded a population of 653 people.

The residents of Bilpin were somewhat older than is typical of the whole country; their median age was 48 years, compared to the national median of 38. Children aged under 15 years made up 17.4% of the population (national average was 18.2%) and people aged 65 years and over made up 20.3% of the population (national average was 16%). 76.7% of people were born in Australia, compared to the national average of 66.9%. 86.8% of people only spoke English at home. The most common responses for religion were No Religion 38.7%, Catholic 17.9% and Anglican 16.8%.

== See also ==
- List of Blue Mountains articles
- List of World's Largest Roadside Attractions
