= Chimney Cottage =

Heritage building in New South Wales, Australia

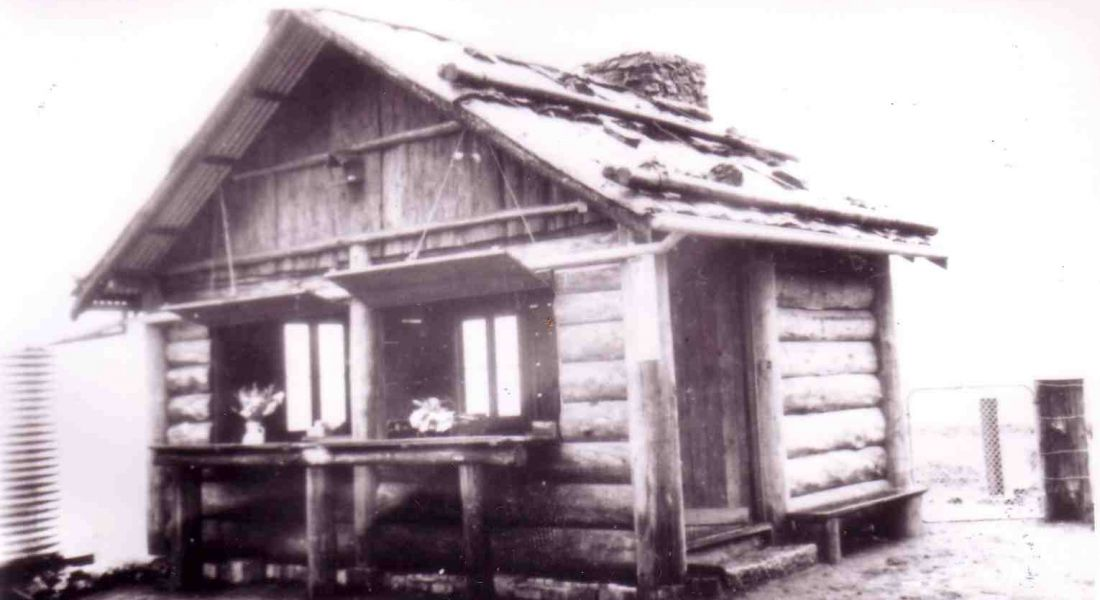
- Chimney Cottage circa 1932
- Interactive map of Chimney Cottage
- 33°30′28″S 150°22′31″E
- Location: 31-37 Queens Avenue, Mount Wilson, City of Blue Mountains, New South Wales, 2786, Australia

History
- Built: 1932–1932
- Built for: Gregson family

Site notes
- Architect: Charles Jefferson
- Architectural style: Log Cabin

New South Wales Heritage Register
- Official name: Chimney Cottage
- Type: Local Environmental Plan
- Criteria: a, c, f
- Designated: 27 Dec 1991
- Reference no.: MW028
- Type: Garden Residential
- Category: Parks, Gardens and Trees
- Builders: Kirk brothers

Chimney Cottage is a heritage building of significance located at 9-13 Waterfall Road (previously called Queens Ave), Mount Wilson in the City of Blue Mountains local government area of New South Wales postcode 2786, Australia. It was designed by Charles Jefferson and built during 1932 by the Kirk Brothers (of Mt Wilson) for the Gregson family. It is also known as The Loft and Blueberry Lodge at Chimney Cottage. The property is privately owned.

== History ==
Chimney Cottage was the first successful tea-room kiosk in Mount Wilson during the 1930s, making Chimney Cottage a site of local significance. Mount Wilson, a heritage garden village, is in the World Heritage Blue Mountains, 2 hours from Sydney. Mount Wilson has natural bushland and rainforest, walks and canyons as well as historic houses and exotic gardens.

The Chimney Cottage property of today is a large dark stained log cabin building that was designed and created predominately by Helen Avery, interior designer and her architect Ian McMillian in the late 1980s, however Chimney Cottage started as a small single log cabin building that operated as a small team room kiosk for tourists. The design of the original log-cabin Chimney Cottage was based on the Americanisation of Mrs. Margaret Gregson's father, English-born Charles Jefferson. The south side of the original building has evidence of a fold down servery where Margaret Gregson would serve the guests morning tea and lunch. On the east side of the original building there is a stable door that was used for entry to the tea room kiosk. The stable door also has a small counter that was used for serving guests. Beside the stable door to the original tea room kiosk is a rough bootscraper that was used before entry into the tea room kiosk. The original pavilion also has a large rubble stone fireplace and chimney from which the building takes its name. Chimney Cottage remains an example of early twentieth-century kiosks providing evidence of its original function to this day.

Margaret Gregson successfully operated the tea room kiosk business at Chimney Cottage for visitors and tourists for many years with guests often entertained on the lawns of the Chimney Cottage grounds. Often visitors to Mt Wilson would discover Chimney Cottage's tea room kiosk by following one of the four 3 ft by 2 ft signs on the Bell - Mt Wilson road and near Wynstay Estate saying "To Chimney Cottage".

In 1943, Margaret Gregson developed cancer and the tea room kiosk closed following her death. Edward Gregson's companion Emma Lulu Ashdown, also died at age 70 years at Chimney Cottage on 1 May 1943. Emma Lulu Ashdown resided at Chimney Cottage for 13 years and is buried in the grounds of the St Georges Church of England at Mt Wilson. Until the end of World War II, Edward Gregson and his three girls remained at Chimney Cottage. Chimney Cottage was sold by Edward Gregson in 1946, when the Gregson's moved into "Applecot" a converted apple shed on their property.

In 1963, Duncan ("Jock") Rennie Lumsden a Scottish World War II veteran, purchased Chimney Cottage. Jock arrived at Chimney Cottage Mount Wilson with his three children in 1963. One of Jock's sons, Fraser, was the primary builder of The Studio building on the grounds of Chimney Cottage. In 1974, after The Studio construction was complete, Chimney Cottage became a centre for local artists, including Clifton Pugh. In December 1979, Langer Avery (a Sydney businessman) and Helen Avery (an interior designer) purchased Chimney Cottage from Jock Lumsden.

== Owners ==
Over time, Chimney Cottage has had numerous owners:

- Edward Gregson
- Duncan ("Jock") Lumsden
- Langer Edward ("Ted") Avery (a Sydney businessman) and Helen Avery (a Sydney interior designer)
- Carstairs (a Katoomba hotel-keeper)
- Bruce Knott and Margaret Wickins (Current Owners)

== Bed and Breakfast ==
In 1986, Helen Avery established the first bed and breakfast accommodation at Chimney Cottage. Initially accommodation was provided in Blueberry Lodge (previously called The Studio) but once the Avery family completed the addition of new buildings in 1988, accommodation expanded to include The Loft.

== Blueberry Lodge (previously, The Studio) ==
In 1974 Duncan Lumsden built the original building on the Chimney Cottage property known as The Studio. The Studio was later renamed Blueberry Lodge. The building was originally built as an artists studio for both himself and his daughter Fiona Lumsden as well as other aspiring artists. Fiona Lumsden grew up at Chimney Cottage of Mt Wilson set amidst the wilderness of the Blue Mountains. Whilst at Chimney Cottage Fiona learnt about the birds, animals and plants of the wilderness that surrounded her. Fiona Lumsden became an artist and has produced many private commissions and sold paintings Australia-wide and internationally. Fiona's work has been in many group exhibitions, gallery displays and window art displays. Fiona Lumsden's work has also exhibited at the Australian Museum in 1987, and at Hunters Hill, Sydney in 1998. Her work was displayed in a major showing at the Blue Mountains Botanic Garden, Mt Tomah, entitled "Wollemi Wild Things", from December 2012 to January 2013.

During the time Chimney Cottage was owned by the Avery family, in 1986 Helen Avery converted the rustic and basic concrete block building called The Studio at Chimney Cottage into a Bed and Breakfast accommodation business.

== The Loft ==
Built by Ted Avery and Helen Avery in 1988. The Loft is opposite Waterfall Reserve Mount Wilson. Originally, The Loft only consisted of the upstairs portion, whilst the downstairs portion was a two-car garage.

== Gardens ==
During the late 1990s, Ted Avery and Helen Avery employed a full time horticulturist, Jon Guyver, for several years to assist the Avery family design and construct the extensive gardens of Chimney Cottage.

=== Stone fences ===
Chimney Cottage has extensive stone fencing providing the property with an elegant style. In the mid-1980s, Ted Avery and Helen Avery engaged local stonemason Peter Hodginson to construct the extensive and beautiful stone fences that surround Chimney Cottage.

=== Blueberries ===
The Blueberry plantations at Chimney Cottage were established by Ted Avery and Helen Avery in 1982. The Averys applied for a water license under Section 10 of the Water Act 1912 in 1982 to use a pump to irrigate 1 hectare of blueberries. The blueberries from Chimney Cottage were sold to many hotels, bed and breakfasts, and clubs during the late 1980s under the business name "Chimney Cottage Farm".

=== Azaleas ===
Chimney Cottage has extensive Azelea plantings established by Ted Avery and Helen Avery in 1986,

=== Chestnut trees ===
The Gregson family planted Chestnut trees on the grounds of Chimney Cottage.

== Rimon ==
In the mid-1980s Ted Avery and Helen Avery purchased the property directly adjoining Chimney Cottage called "Rimon" at 5-7 Waterfall Road Mount Wilson. Rimon is approximately 5 acres of land. Rimon was not well kept up and required extensive demolition and re-construction. Ted Avery invested heavily in the Rimon property including a complete refit of the entire home and extensive garden plantings and development. For many years, the Avery family used Rimon as a caretaker cottage for staff working on Chimney Cottage, including the Avery's full time horticulturist, Jon Guyver. The property has an open grazing paddock, some small areas of natural rainforest and a natural spring fed drinkable waterhole. The Gardens of Rimon have a variety of exotic specimen. In the late 1980s, Ted Avery and Jon Guyvery planted many trees, shrubs and bulbs throughout the property, including but not limited to dogwoods, magnolias, blueberries, and plantings of rare bulbs. The gardens include a small organic home orchard with lemon, lime, cumquat, apple, plum, pear, and blood oranges.

In November 2020, the Rimon property was sold for $1,450,000.
