= Berambing =

- Town
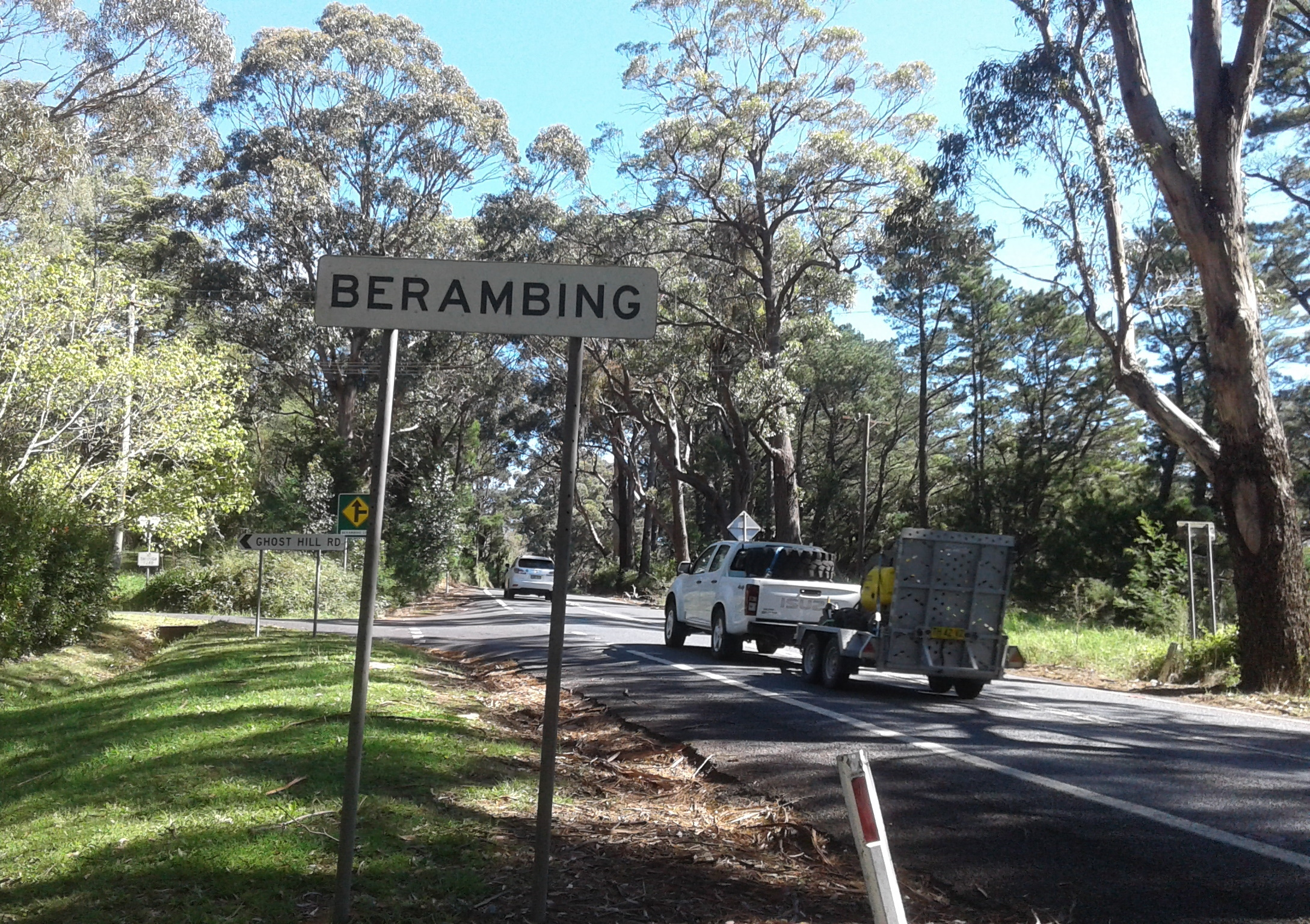
- Berambing on the Bell's Line of Road

- Coordinates: 33°32′00″S 150°26′38″E
- Country: Australia
- State: New South Wales
- LGAs: City of Hawkesbury; City of Blue Mountains
- Location: 100 km (62 mi) NW of Sydney central business district; 41 km (25 mi) E of Lithgow
- Established: 1832

Government
  - State electorates: Hawkesbury; Blue Mountains
  - Federal division: Macquarie

Area
  - Total: 4.3 km^{2} (1.7 sq mi)
- Elevation: 780 m (2,560 ft)

Population
  - Total: 104 (2021 census)
  - Density: 24.2/km^{2} (62.6/sq mi)
- Postcode: 2758
Localities around Berambing
Mount Wilson	Mount Irvine	Warawaralong
	Berambing
Mount Tomah

Berambing is a rural locality in the Blue Mountains of New South Wales, Australia. The settlement is clustered around the Bells Line of Road, between Windsor and Lithgow, 10 kilometres (6.2 mi) west of Bilpin. It is situated across both the City of Hawkesbury and City of Blue Mountains local government areas. The settlement had a population of 104 people at the 2021 census.

Berambing is known for its apple, nuts and stone fruit orchards. The natural environment of the area attracts visitors, and the village is in close proximity to the Mount Tomah Botanic Garden and the Wollemi and Blue Mountains national parks.

== History ==
=== Aboriginal occupation ===
The Berambing locality is within the traditional territory of the Darkiñung people (known as ‘The Branch’ natives by European settlers after their first contact in the vicinity of the Grose River, a tributary of the Hawkesbury River, near Richmond). The Aboriginal people used the term 'Wollombi' or 'Wollemi' to describe themselves or their country. The people of the Darkiñung language group occupied the ranges from Richmond to Maitland, with part of their country incorporating the catchment areas of the Hawkesbury river tributaries. Aborigines probably occupied the high ridges (such as the Berambing locality) only intermittently according to the season.

=== European exploration ===
In November 1804, George Caley, with three convicts in his party, attempted to cross the Blue Mountains along the northern edge of the Grose Valley and passed to the south of Mount Tomah. Caley ascended a mountain south-west of Berambing that he named Mount Banks before turning back.

In August 1823, Archibald Bell, the nineteen year-old son of the police magistrate in the Windsor area, travelled along the route that would later become the Bell’s Line of Road. On the journey from Richmond to Mount Tomah Bell followed the directions of an Aboriginal woman who had travelled the route. He initially failed to find a safe descent to the west from Mount Tomah, but returned a month later and was able to travel into the Hartley valley. Bell found the greatest difficulty on the journey “was in the thick part of his way to Tomah, so much so that in one place he was forced to cut his way through three miles”. Bell used the Aboriginal term ‘Balcamatta’ to describe the country below Mount Tomah where he encountered difficulty proceeding.

Upon his return in September 1823, Archibald Bell sent his report of the route over the Blue Mountains to Governor Brisbane. Soon afterwards the surveyor-general John Oxley instructed his assistant-surveyor Robert Hoddle to survey Bell's line of road. Hoddle completed the task and his survey report was submitted in November 1823. The road across the mountains was soon afterwards cleared and formed by convict labour.

=== Settlement ===
In June 1829 in a published "List of Towns and Stations… published for general information" the following was included: "Tomah Mountain, on Bell’s Road to Bathurst" (in Northumberland county), 60 miles from Sydney.

George M. C. Bowen, who had previously been a land commissioner and surveyor, was granted 2,560 acres (1,036 ha) in 1831 at Berambing near Mount Tomah, which he named 'Bulgamatta'. Bowen described Mount Tomah as “the highest and central elevation of the group which adjoined my land”. Bowen sold his landholding in 1836. The location of 'Bulgamatta' homestead was known as 'Old Tamah' in the mid-1950s and is now the location of the Chapel Hill Retreat (in Berambing Crescent).

With the establishment of pastoral runs beyond Bathurst and Mudgee herds of sheep and cattle began to be driven along Bell’s Line of Road to the markets at Homebush. The road from Mount Tomah to the Hawkesbury floodplain was often precarious and difficult to travel along. The drovers in charge of stock "would be met at Mt. Tomah by a pilot, whose duty it was to see the travelling flocks and herds through to the lowland plain below Kurrajong". The road served as ‘Bell’s Live Stock Route’ for many years, “practically until the western railway undertook the work of transporting the stock to market” from the mid-1870s.

The following description of Berambing was published in January 1861:

"Berambing is between two and three miles from the summit of Mount Tomah, which is concealed by the intervening forest; but its elevation is considerable, and the climate is cool, bracing, and agreeable, and to those who can really appreciate nature there is a rich fund of enjoyment, and a field of research rendered doubly interesting from having been the scene of some of Allan Cunningham's botanical wanderings... Immediately bordering on Berambing the forest consists of peppermint, stringybark, grey gum, and mahogany. Recent rains had rendered the road muddy, and rather impeded our progress."

Author of children's books and environmentalist, Hesba Fay Brinsmead, was born in Berambing in 1922 and her upbringing in the area inspired much of the background for her books. The property established by Brinsmead’s parents at Berambing was named 'Sookaboomi' (Javanese for 'Longtime'). Her Longtime trilogy was set in the area and based on her experiences during her childhood and teenage years.

In August 1925, it was reported that official approval had been given for the provision of a mail service between Bilpin and Berambing. Mr. E. K. Hungerford of Berambing was contracted to convey the mails twice a week between the two places.

In December 1954, the Hawkesbury Development Company Ltd. (having the electricity franchise for most of the Colo Shire) completed the extension of the electricity supply "from Bilpin township to Berambing post office". In January 1955, it was reported that "Berambing residents are very pleased that electricity is now available, and already a number have the good fortune to have their homes wired and connected". Four sub-stations were installed "and supply made available to 27 homes".

=== 2019 bushfire ===
In December 2019, Berambing was severely impacted by the Gospers Mountain bushfire. In an effort to contain the massive fire firefighters had commenced a large backburn in the Mount Wilson and Mount Irvine areas, but with the dry conditions, heavy fuel loads and erratic weather conditions, the backburn quickly grew out of control. Under deteriorating conditions the bushfire crossed Mount Irvine Road and on 15 December it reached Mount Tomah, Berambing and Bilpin, destroying numerous houses and other buildings, before crossing Bell’s Line of Road into the Grose Valley. The Gospers Mountain fire was the largest forest fire ever recorded in Australia, burning more than 500,000 hectares.

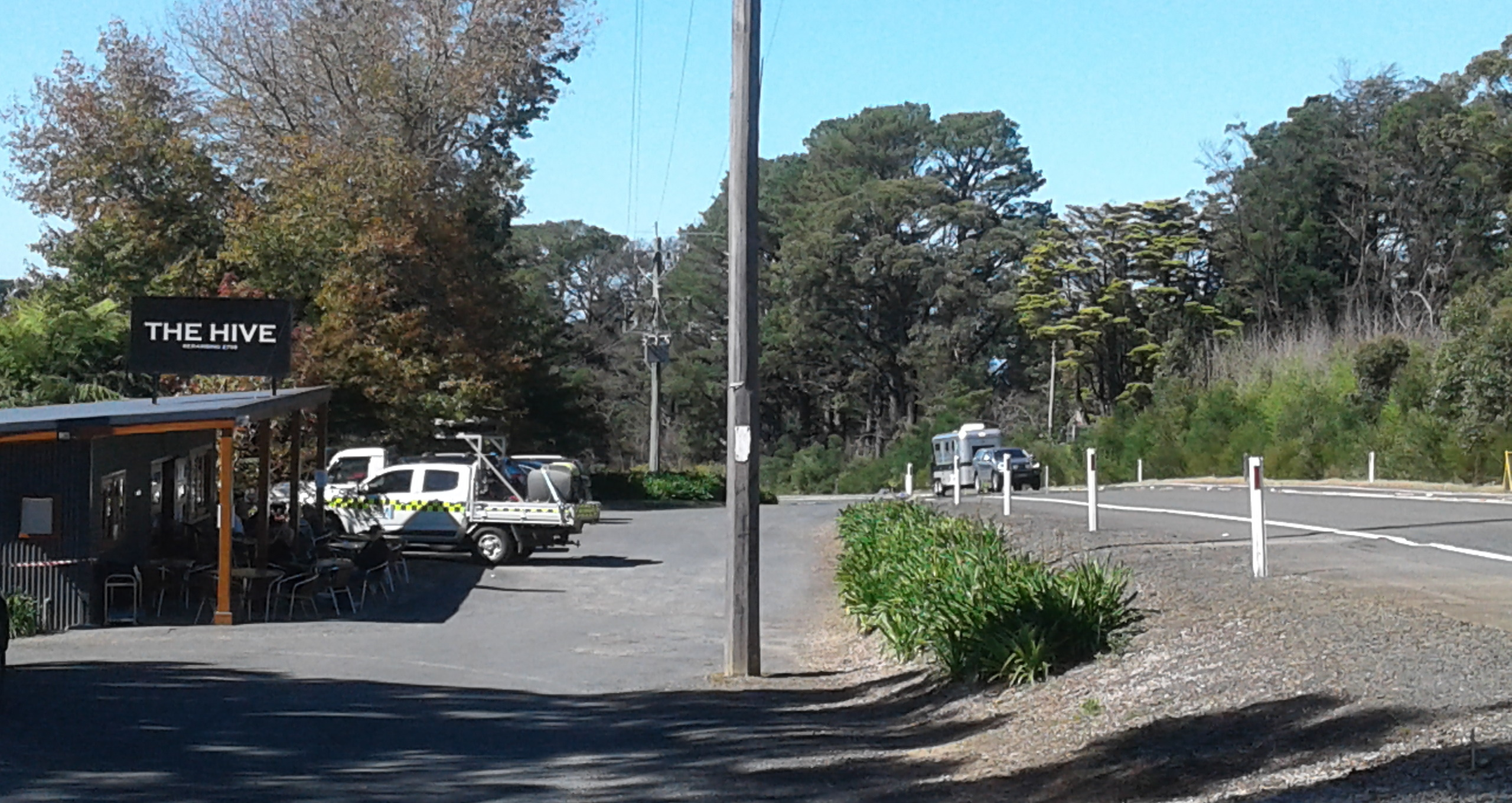
The Hive beside Bell's Line of Road at Berambing.

== Transport ==
There are approximately five buses per week which connect Richmond station and Berambing.
