= George Bowen (colonial settler) =

Public servant and landowner (1803–1889)

Lieutenant George Meares Countess Bowen (1803–1889) was a military officer and colonial settler of New South Wales, Australia. He was mainly associated with Bowen Mountain, Mount Tomah, Berambing, and the nearby areas of the Blue Mountains.

== Early life ==
He was born on 14 January 1803, at Wells, in Somerset, England. His parents were Captain William Henry Hawkwell Bowen, R.N., who died in 1813, and his wife Susannah (née Parker, died 1840). His maternal grandfather was Admiral Sir William Parker, 1st Baronet, of Harburn (1743—1803). His unusual second middle name, Countess, is after George Countess, a naval colleague and friend of his father. Bowen became an army officer, not a naval officer like his ancestors.

== New South Wales ==
Leaving England in October 1826, he arrived in Sydney in February 1827, on the Midas, leading a detachment of the 39th regiment, guarding convicts. Also arriving was Bowen's superior officer, Captain Charles Sturt, with another detachment of the 39th and more convicts, aboard Mariner.

Bowen arrived in New South Wales, during the administration of Governor Ralph Darling. Darling had been appointed with the objective of restoring discipline to the penal colony, after what was seen by the British government of the time as the relatively lax rule of Governor Macquarie and Governor Brisbane. Darling tended to rely upon like-minded military men for his administration. The well-connected Lieutenant Bowen, a Sandhurst graduate, found Darling a willing patron. Bowen was soon appointed to the Surveyor-General's office, serving as an Assistant Surveyor and a Commissioner for Lands. From 1 November 1828, he went on half-pay, effectively retiring from his regiment. His retiring allowed Bowen to be granted land in the colony, something not permitted to serving military officers.

=== Surveyor ===
in 1827, Bowen was part of Hamilton Hume's expedition in Blue Mountains, searching for alternative routes, avoiding the steep descent at Mount York, via which to descend the western escarpment of the Blue Mountains. He surveyed the boundaries of the County of Cook, one of the Nineteen Counties, within which the colonial government allowed settlers to take up land under Governor Darling's order of 1829.

He developed a warm relationship with the Surveyor-General John Oxley, but less so with the new Deputy Surveyor-General Thomas Mitchell, who arrived in Sydney in 1827 and who later became Surveyor-General after Oxley's death in May 1828. It seems that Mitchell was resentful of Governor Darling and any of those who had been favoured by Darling, such as Oxley, Bowen, Darling's brothers-in-law, Henry Dumaresq (Darling's private secretary) and William Dumaresq (Acting Deputy Surveyor-General under Oxley), and Charles Sturt (Darling's military secretary and a cousin of Henry Dumaresq's wife).

In September 1823, Archibald Bell Jr. had identified arable land along the route that became the Bells Line of Road, a second route across the hitherto impassable Blue Mountains. Bell had noticed that there was apparently a route across the mountains that was known to some, but not all, of the local Aboriginal peoples. Oxley sent Robert Hoddle to survey the route. Hoddle wrote a report, in November 1823, that praised the rich soil around Mt Tomah and concluded that Bell's route was a superior way to reach Bathurst. Based on Hoddle's report, Bowen made a request to Thomas Mitchell to have a road developed along Bell's route. Mitchell was strongly committed to his own preferred route for the Bathurst Road, using the Victoria Pass, and sent a scathing report to Governor Darling on Bowen's proposal. The matter probably further increased the enmity between the two men. That seems not to have dampened Bowen's enthusiasm for the area around Mt Tomah, and his advocacy of a new road was likely motivated, at least in part, by self interest. However, it was the Victoria Pass route that received approval and funding and became the main route. Although a primitive road was blazed using convict labour, 'Bell's Road' or 'Bell's New Line' was rarely used, even by the early 1830s. For many years, it was effectively just a stock route; it was not opened as a public road across the mountains until September 1905.

Mitchell's promotion and the end of the Darling administration in 1831, undoubtedly curtailed Bowen's career as an assistant-surveyor. Mitchell went on to greatly strengthen the professional core of his survey department, by appointing English immigrant surveyors and survey draftsmen, such as Samuel Augustus Perry (the new Deputy Surveyor-General), James Larmer, Edmund Kennedy, and numerous others.

=== Early settler in the Blue Mountains ===
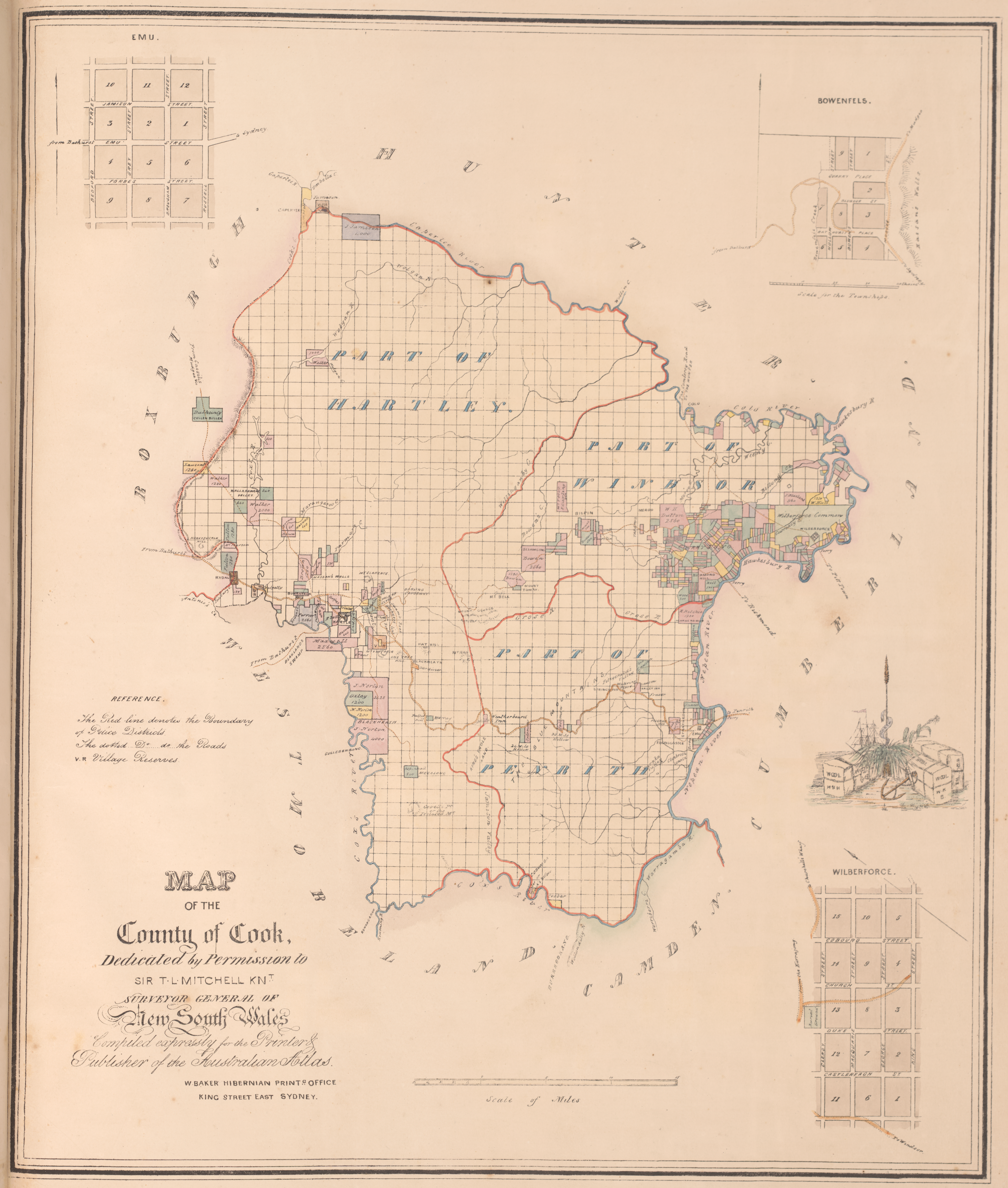
Map of County of Cook, showing the two Bowen family landholdings near Mt Tomah and Bowen's Creek (when viewed at highest available resolution).

Although most of the high parts of the Blue Mountains are sandstone country and relatively infertile, Mt Tomah and the surrounding area has deep, rich, volcanic soil. Bowen probably first encountered the area himself, while surveying the boundaries of the new County of Cook.

Bowen's mother, Susannah, came out to New South Wales in 1827. In 1830, she requested from Darling, and received, a land grant of two square miles around the summit of Mount Tomah. Bowen himself received a land grant of four square miles, nearby, at what is now Berambing, and he established a farm named 'Bulgamatta'—said to be from Aboriginal language for 'mountain and water'—there in 1831. Bowen cleared and developed his land using convict labour, built a house, and set up a sawmill on what is now known as Bowen's Creek. He had a road built between his house and the sawmill, about 300 m lower in elevation. Even with convict labour provided by the colonial government, Bowen had a difficult life in what was then near wilderness. Although his landholdings had been taken up in 1830-31, the deed of grant was not finalised until 1836. Soon afterwards in 1836, Bowen sold his landholding. and later that year bought a town allotment in Windsor.

Bowen and his convict labourers were the first colonial settlers around Mt Tomah but, of course, not the first people in the area. Bowen found nobody living permanently on what he then saw as his land, but that land was only a very small part of the traditional lands of local Aboriginal people. During his time at 'Bulgamatta', Bowen had peaceful interactions with Aboriginal people, who passed across it. These people included one young man 'Billy Kootee', whose cooperation Bowen courted. When the others in his clan moved on, Kootee stayed on 'Bulgamatta', and appears to have assisted Bowen as a guide, when Bowen explored the local area and when surveying land. Bowen had a brass breastplate made that declared Kootee to be the 'King of Mt Tomah'. However, there is evidence neither that Kootee was a leader among his people, nor that there was an Aboriginal clan associated only with Mt Tomah and its surrounds.

Susannah returned to England in 1836, giving her son a power of attorney over her land at Mount Tomah. Bowen attempted unsuccessfully to sell it in 1838 and again in 1854; that land then passed into the hands of Bowen's son, George Bartley Bowen. The land at Mount Tomah—together with Bowen's later landholding at 'Bowen Mount'—was operated as orchards, for cattle raising, and as a dairy farm.

=== Relations with the church, first marriage, and Berrima ===
For a time, in the mid-1830s, it appeared that Bowen was destined to become a Church of England clergyman.

Bishop William Broughton, first and only Church of England, Bishop of Australia, was a conservative churchman who was favoured during the years of Darling's administration. Later, he opposed the reforms of liberal-minded Governor Richard Bourke, who took over from Darling in 1831. Bourke disestablished the Church of England and declared each religious denomination on equal footing before the law. Broughton was a 'Tractarian', and his opposition to Bourke's reforms fits within the context of Tractarian opposition to Whig government-led reforms, in England and Ireland, at around the same time.

One of Broughton's great difficulties was a shortage of Anglican clergy in the colony. Broughton saw religiously-minded and apparently respectable Bowen as a potential candidate for ordination, leaving it with Bowen to consider his position. Bowen's public response was to publish a book on theology in 1836. His religious views proved unorthodox, leading to controversy and opposition to his ordination, to such an extent that he was denied the sacrament at his local church in Windsor. Once ordination was actually denied to him, Bowen protested to the Colonial Office.

The controversy that he had caused apparently had subsided by March 1837, when Bowen was married to Charlotte Augusta Freer, daughter of Lieutenant Thomas Freer (or Fryer), in the same church, in which he had been denied the sacrament in 1836, and by the same clergyman, who had denied it to him, Henry Tarlton Stiles. Bowen's relationship with Stiles seems to have been a complicated one, as Bowen was the godfather of Stiles' son, Henry Bowen Augustine Stiles, born in 1834.

In 1839, Bowen was appointed as Police Magistrate at Berrima. The Bowen family were living there when, at only 22 years of age, Charlotte died, in 1840, leaving Bowen with their two small children. Her death notice in the Sydney Morning Herald, was accompanied by one for Bowen's mother, who had died earlier in 1840. Charlotte's remains are buried in the churchyard of All Saint's Anglican Church, at Sutton Forest. In 1840, following Charlotte’s death, Bowen sold land in the Windsor township.

Bowen heard the confession of the bushranger and serial killer, John Lynch, made on the day before his execution at Berrima Gaol, in April 1842. After the execution, Bowen searched for the bodies of victims, to whose murders Lynch had confessed. By finding human remains, he was able to discharge two innocent men being held on murder charges.

He resigned as Police Magistrate and, on 30 January 1843, was farewelled by notables of the Berrima district—for his return to England. The farewell address was given by Charles Throsby. However, Bowen still owned land in the colony, and it seems he did not plan his return to England as being permanent.

=== England, second marriage, and 'Bowen Mount' ===
He made the journey to England in 1843 and, while there, married his deceased wife’s sister, Letitia, in August of that year. Such a marriage would not be allowed, by law, in England until 1907, or in New South Wales until February 1876. Not deterred by the existing canon law and the Marriage Act of 1835, Bowen had banns of marriage read and a marriage ceremony was performed at the Church of St. Martin's in the Fields. However, to overcome the legal fact that their Anglican marriage was void, the couple then reportedly married for a second time, at Wandsbek—then a Danish-ruled exclave of the Duchy of Holstein—in a Lutheran ceremony, under a letter of permission given by the King of Denmark. It is a testament to the lengths to which Bowen would go to assert his own views, against both church and state. Indeed, it is quite conceivable that the entire overseas journey was necessary, only because it would not have been possible for Bowen to marry Letitia, in New South Wales.

Bowen almost certainly knew that his English marriage would not be recognised in the colony. He had an announcement notice, with details of both wedding ceremonies, inserted in the Sydney Morning Herald, three years later in 1846, after his return to New South Wales. The second marriage produced another four children, who were both first cousins and half-siblings to his two earlier children.

In February 1842, Bowen had obtained title over 83 acres in the County of Cook. This was the foundation of Bowen's landholding, 'Bowen Mount', at what would become later be known as Bowen Mountain. It would become his family's home, once he returned to New South Wales and built a substantial timber house, on the highest ridge. The house was surrounded by ornate gardens and orange orchards. He had acquired another 303 acres in 1847.

Not content to let his disputes with the church die down, Bowen authored another theological work, with his authorship thinly disguised, under the pseudonym of Aposynagogos. He finally broke his connection with the church altogether, after Bishop Frederick Barker replaced Broughton in 1855.

== Later life and death ==
In 1854, Bowen was appointed surveyor of roads for the road to Bathurst, but it was a short-lived role, ending after he fell out with his trustees. He was to spend most of the rest of his life living quietly at 'Bowen Mount', before moving finally to 'Keston', in Carabella Street, Kirribilli, late in life. 'Keston' occupied a large piece of east-facing waterfront land at the eastern end of Kirribilli Point.

Around 1876, he privately published an autobiography, Autobiography, Modern Parables and Predictions.

In earlier life, Bowen was a man who had both much promise and much opportunity, He grew to be wealthy in old age. However, he did not achieve the honours and social status that he craved, largely due to his querulous, argumentative, and stubborn personality.

Bowen died at Kirribilli, on 1 September 1889, and was buried in what is now St Thomas Rest Park. His estate was valued at £35,024 (equivalent to $6,000,000 in 2022).

== Legacy ==
Bowen is remembered by the naming of Bowenfels (originally known as Bowen's Hollow), Bowen Mountain, Bowen’s Creek near Mount Irvine, and the Parish of Bowen, all in the Blue Mountains area. Bowen's mother's former land, at Mount Tomah, is now the Blue Mountains Botanic Garden.

His house, 'Bowen Mount', burnt down in a fire in 1914. The land was subjected to subdivision from 1960, although issues with handling sewage have limited the extent to which the area has been developed for housing. The area is now known as Bowen Mountain.

His later house, 'Keston', at 31 Carabella Street, Kirribilli, was later the home of the politician and High Court judge, Richard Edward O’Connor. It was demolished. in 1912, and replaced with another large house. Still known as 'Keston', the second building survives, now sub-divided into apartments, and its former waterfront garden is now two apartment blocks.

The State Library of New South Wales contains a number of photographs of the Bowen family, in the pictorial material from the papers of Rae Else-Mitchell.

Bowen's autobiography, specifically the parts concerning his interactions with Aboriginal people, has been used by scholars to identify the group of Aboriginal people that Bowen met in the 1830s. However, different scholars have reached different conclusions, on whether those people were Darkinung people of the northern mountains or Dharug people of the Cumberland Plain and Georges River. These different conclusions still affect people, who trace their ancestry to survivors of the colonisation of the region.

Bowen's disputes with the church, over church doctrine and matrimony, are now largely forgotten. However, his second marriage, and that of Bowen's contemporary, Charles Joseph La Trobe, can now be seen as early instances of defiance against religiously-inspired legal restrictions on marriage, which would later progress over much time to become the "Marriage Equality" movement.

== External links section ==
- Australian Dictionary of Biography: Bowen, George Meares Countess
