= Warawaralong, New South Wales =

Warawaralong New South Wales
- Coordinates: 33°30′59″S 150°28′40″E
- Postcode(s): 2758
- Elevation: 640 m (2,100 ft)
- Location: 95 km (59 mi) NW of Sydney CBD; 45 km (28 mi) E of Lithgow
- LGA(s): City of Hawkesbury
- County: Cook
- Parish: Bilpin
- State electorate(s): Hawkesbury
- Federal division(s): Macquarie
Suburbs around Warawaralong:
	Mount Irvine
Berambing	Warawaralong	Bilpin
	Blue Mountains National Park

Warawaralong is a small village stretched across the Bells Line of Road in the Blue Mountains. It's in the state of New South Wales, Australia in the City of Hawkesbury.
