= Wynnstay (disambiguation) =

Wynnstay is a country estate in Wales, UK.

Wynnstay may also refer to:

- Wynnstay Group, Welsh company (sometimes branded as Wynnstay or Wynnstay Stores)
- Wynnstay Arms Hotel, Wrexham, hotel
- Wynnstay Arms Hotel, Ruabon, hotel

== See also ==
- Wynstay Estate, Australia
- Wynnestay, house in Philadelphia
