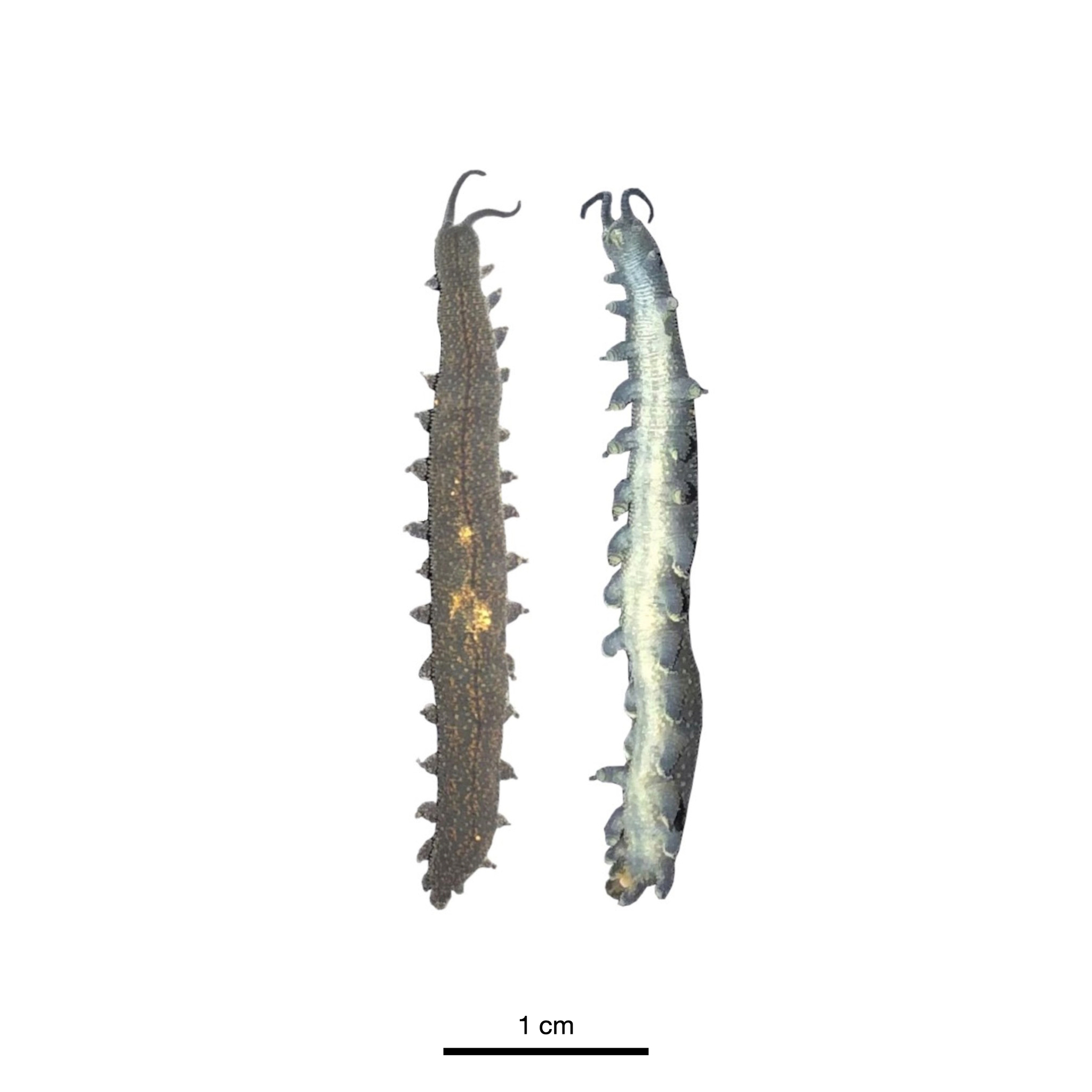
- Euperipatoides leuckartii

Scientific classification
- Kingdom: Animalia
- Phylum: Onychophora
- Family: Peripatopsidae
- Genus: Euperipatoides
- Species: E. leuckartii

Binomial name
- Euperipatoides leuckartii (Sänger, 1871)

Synonyms
- Peripatus leuckartii (Sänger, 1871); Peripatus leuckarti var. orientalis (Fletcher, 1895); Peripatus orientalis (Bouvier, 1902); Peripatoides leuckarti (Bouvier, 1907); Ooperipatus leuckarti (Baehr, 1977)

= Euperipatoides leuckartii =

Species of Peripatopsid velvet worm

Euperipatoides leuckartii (Note: often misspelt as leuckarti) is a species of velvet worm in the family Peripatopsidae. This species is ovoviviparous and has 15 pairs of oncopods (legs). Females of this species range from 5 mm to 40 mm in length, whereas males range from 4 mm to 29 mm. The type locality of this species is Mount Tomah, New South Wales, Australia.
