= Blue Mountains Basalts =

Rock formation in New South Wales, Australia

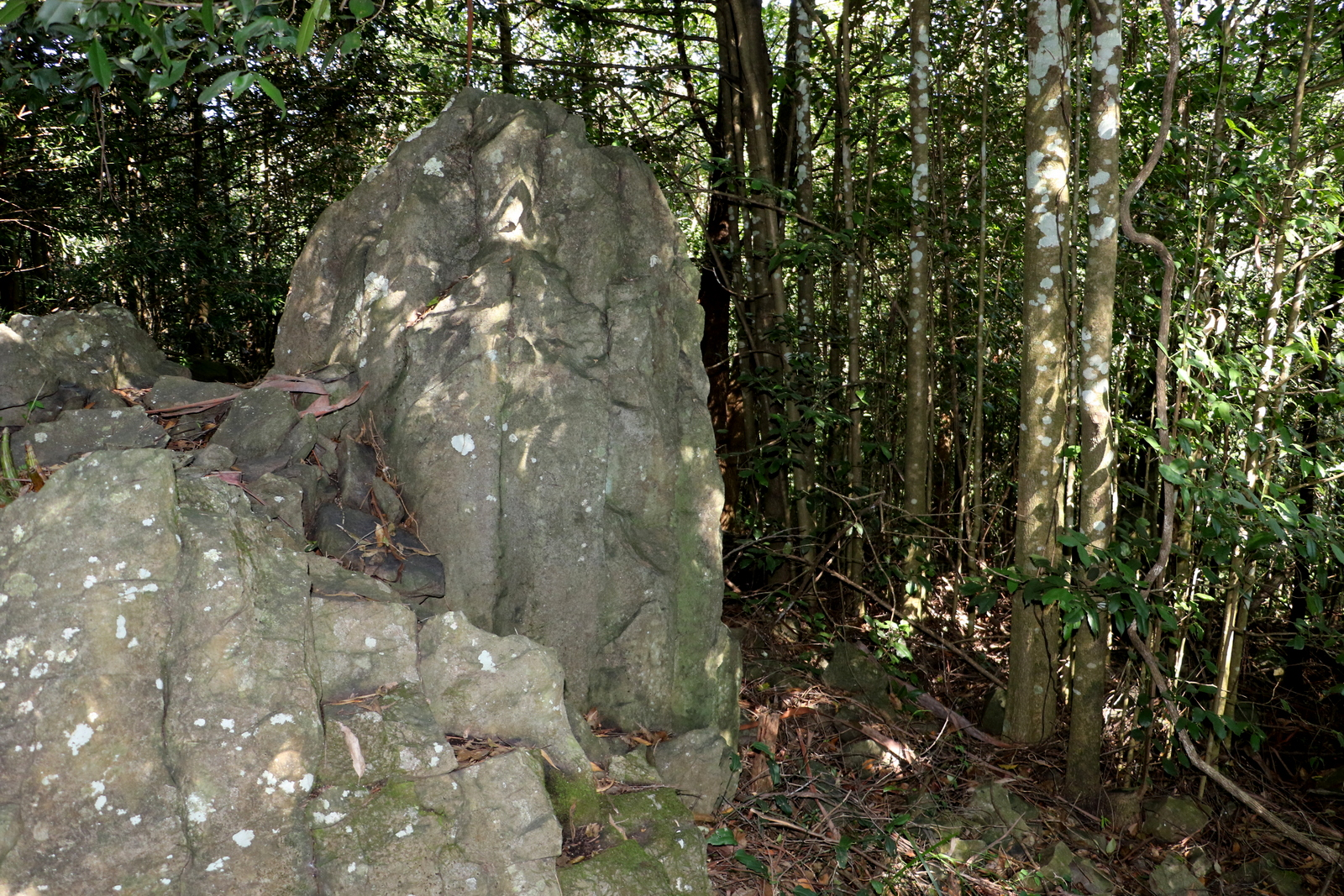
basalt in a rainforest at Mount Tomah, Blue Mountains, Australia

Blue Mountains Basalts are igneous rocks occurring in the Sydney Basin in eastern Australia. This formation is up to 140 metres thick. Formed in the middle Miocene, some 17 million to 14 million years ago.

The remnants of this volcanic lava flow are confined to the higher altitudes in the western Blue Mountains. Such as Mount Hay, Mount Wilson, Mount Irvine, Mount Banks and Mount Tomah.

The olivine basalt caps create red/brown soils, known as red podzolics or krasnozems. They have been exposed to a considerable degree of chemical weathering, with a higher iron-oxide concentration than with podzols, hence the reddish colour. Vegetation on these basalt based soils are associated with rainforest, moist eucalyptus forest and the tourist attraction gardens at Mount Wilson and the Blue Mountains Botanic Garden.

These basalt cap soils have a higher level of moisture retention and fertility than the more common sandstone based soils in the Blue Mountains.

The original volcanic plugs have yet to be discovered, due to the considerable amount of erosion this rock layer has experienced. Geologists have determined that the Blue Mountains Basalts are derived from a lava flow, not a volcanic plug. The remnant basalts were formed from a viscous fluid flow of lava, not a vertical inner core of magma as with an eroded volcano.

== See also ==
- Sydney Basin
- Narrabeen group
- Mount Wilson
