= Helen Avery =

Australian businesswomen (1938–2016)

- Born: Helen Grimwood; 19 October 1938; Melbourne, Victoria, Australia
- Died: 19 May 2016 (aged 77); Sydney, New South Wales, Australia
- Other name: Helen Avery-Evans
- Citizenship: Australian
- Occupation: Businesswoman
- Spouses: Langer Avery (m. 1964–1996) David Avery-Evans (m. 1999–2016)
- Children: Mark Avery; Amanda Avery; Brenton Avery

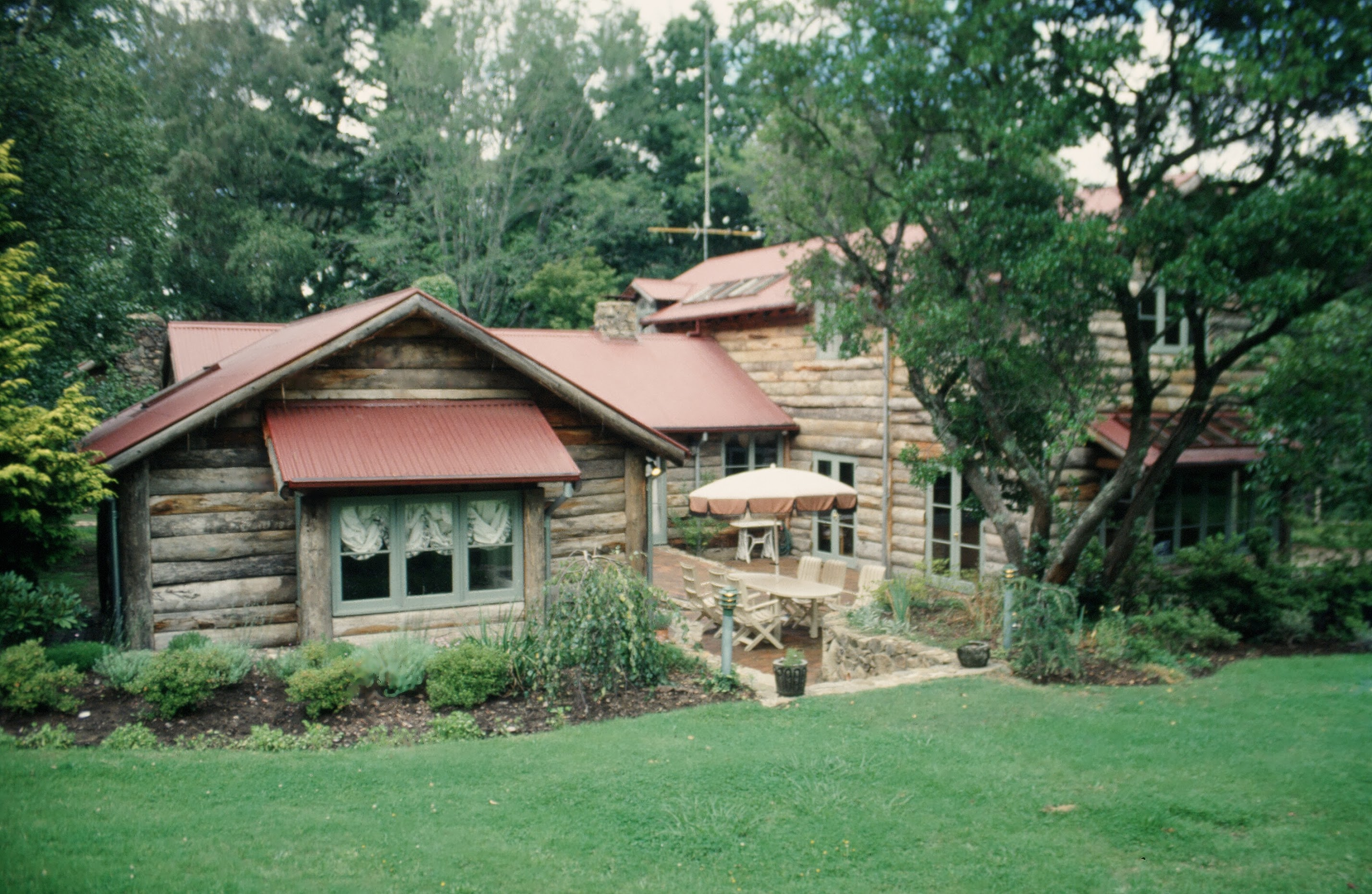
Chimney Cottage

Helen Ruth Avery-Evans (née Grimwood; 19 October 1938 – 19 May 2016) was an Australian businesswoman and interior designer. She was the founder and Managing Director of Nordent, Helen worked as interior designer and project manager on many residential and commercial interior design projects and property development projects in New South Wales and Queensland over her 35 year career. Some of her most notable projects include the project management of the Moorings property development (a luxury waterfront apartment block) at Cremorne Point on Sydney's lower north shore and also the major renovation and reconstruction of Chimney Cottage (a classified heritage building), together with the adjoining Studio (a two storey guest house) and Rimon (a large residential managers home for the estate) together which large scale land clearing and landscaping at Mount Wilson, New South Wales which was completed in 1993, after five year planning and construction period. He husband Langer Avery was a Sydney businessman. Her son Mark Avery is a businessman.

Avery died on May 19, 2016, aged 77.
