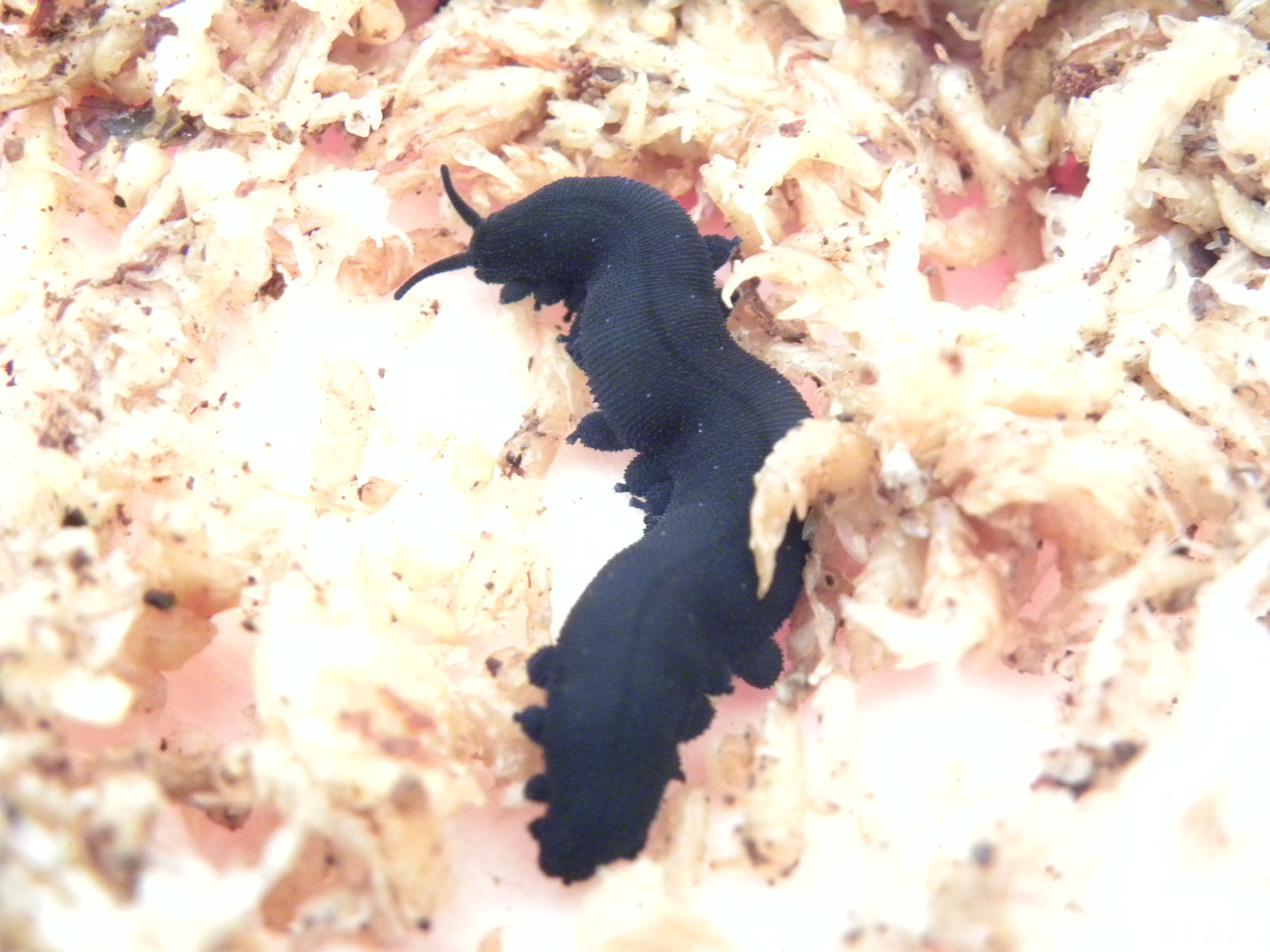

Scientific classification
- Kingdom: Animalia
- Phylum: Onychophora
- Family: Peripatopsidae
- Genus: Euperipatoides
- Species: E. rowelli

Binomial name
- Euperipatoides rowelli Reid, 1996

= Euperipatoides rowelli =

Species of pack-hunting Peripatopsid velvet worm

Euperipatoides rowelli is an ovoviviparous species of velvet worm of the Peripatopsidae family. It is found in New South Wales and the Australian Capital Territory.

== Description ==
As all species in the genus Euperipatoides, E. rowelli has a dark grayish-blue color. This species has 15 pairs of legs in both sexes. Adult female specimens measure about 3 to 6 cm in length, with males being smaller. This species is characterized by two distinct rows of bristles on the antennal rings 4, 6, 9 and 12, while the remaining species of the genus have two distinct rows only on the two or four distal antennal rings.

== Ecology and behaviour ==
Euperipatoides rowelli occurs in humid, temperate forests of southeastern Australia. Its main habitat are decaying logs on the forest floor, where it lives in crevices and feeds on small invertebrates, such as termites and crickets.

The preferred habitat of decaying logs is due to the fact E. rowelli are naturally attracted to darker objects. Because their rhabdomeric layer takes up the entire area inside of the eye, the focal point ends up being behind the retina, leading for the image that hits the retina to actually be underfocused. However, better spatial resolution is provided by the light emitted by the objects in front of them. This shows they are able to differentiate objects that are isoluminant with the background.

Specimens are rarely found alone, usually forming groups of a few individuals containing females, males, and juveniles. Laboratory observations on behavior concluded that these groups present some sort of hierarchy with dominant females.

New logs are usually colonized by wandering males. The pheromones emitted by the first male to reach a log attract additional males, as well as females. It is assumed that males are attracted by other males because their high density increases the attraction of females.

During reproduction, the male places its spermatophore on the female's skin. With the aid of the female's blood cells, the body wall is breached and the sperm enters the female body cavity, then swims to the female genital tract. Females have two uteri and each one can have embryos at different developmental stages, up to six months apart, and from different males. Males mature in about a year, while females can take up to three years.

== Model organism ==
Due to its abundance in its native habitat, E. rowelli is becoming a model organism in the study of behavior and ecology, and especially of gene expression and evolution, leading to a better understanding on the evolution of animals and especially arthropods, to which velvet worms are closely related.
