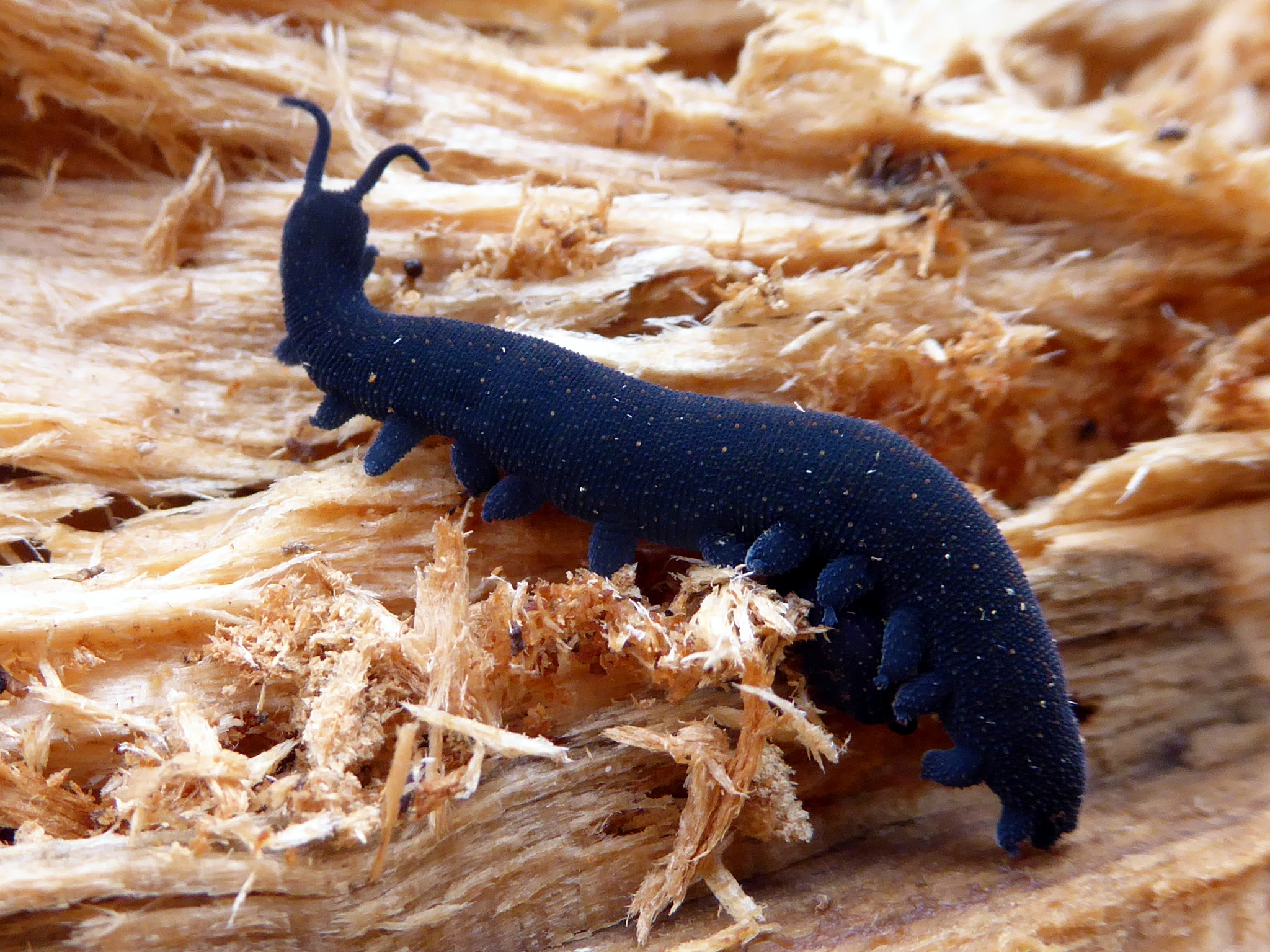
- Euperipatoides rowelli

Scientific classification
- Kingdom: Animalia
- Phylum: Onychophora
- Family: Peripatopsidae
- Genus: Euperipatoides; Ruhberg, 1985

Species
- See text

= Euperipatoides =

Genus of Peripatopsid velvet worms

Euperipatoides is a genus of ovoviviparous velvet worms in the family Peripatopsidae. All species in this genus have 15 pairs of legs in both sexes. All species are found in New South Wales, Australia. E. rowelli is also found in the Australian Capital Territory.

== Species ==
The genus contains the following species:

- Euperipatoides kanangrensis Reid, 1996
- Euperipatoides leuckartii (Sänger, 1871)
- Euperipatoides rowelli Reid, 1996
