= Wynstay Estate =

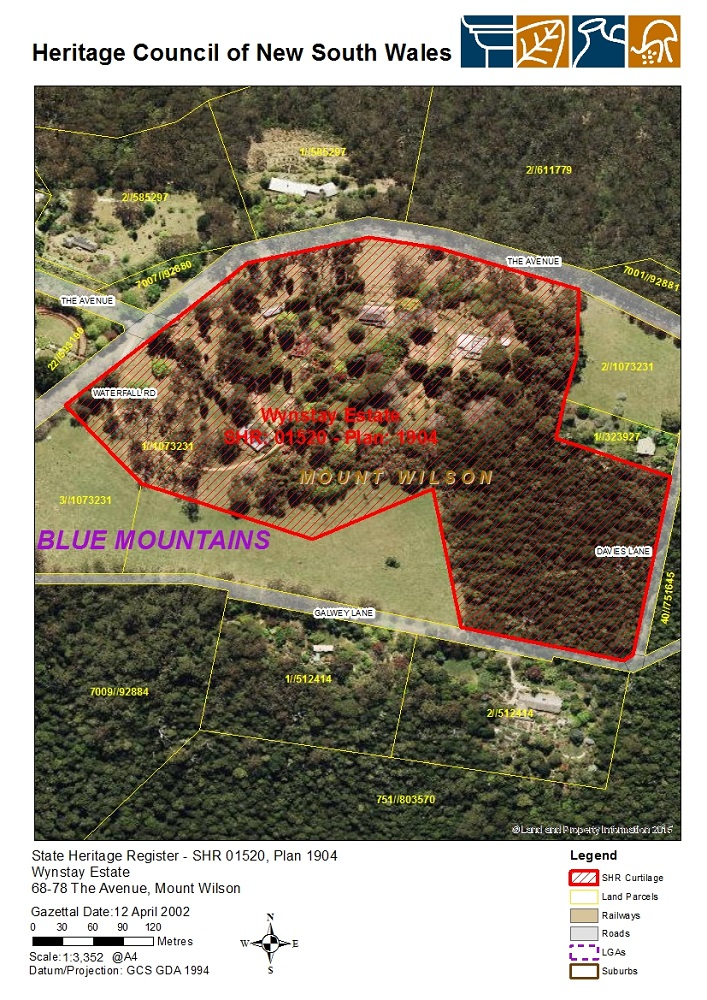
- Heritage boundaries

- Location within New South Wales Location within Australia
- 33°30′17″S 150°22′49″E
- Location: 68-78 The Avenue, Mount Wilson, City of Blue Mountains, New South Wales, Australia

History
- Built: 1875–1893

Site notes
- Architect: Richard Wynne

New South Wales Heritage Register
- Official name: Wynstay Estate; The Turkish Bath
- Type: state heritage (landscape)
- Designated: 12 April 2002
- Reference no.: 1520
- Type: Garden Residential
- Category: Parks, Gardens and Trees
- Builders: Joseland and Gilling; Turkish Bath house by Earnest A Bonney

Wynstay Estate is a heritage-listed farm located at 68-78 The Avenue, Mount Wilson in the City of Blue Mountains local government area of New South Wales, Australia. It was designed by Richard Wynne and built from 1875 to 1893 by Joseland and Gilling; Turkish Bath house by Earnest A. Bonney. It is also known as The Turkish Bath. The property is privately owned. It was added to the New South Wales State Heritage Register on 12 April 2002.

== History ==
In 1833 William Romaine Govett completed his survey of 'the mountain ranges immediately to the north of Bell's Ridge' in which he described Mount Wilson as "high mass of range of the richest soil and covered with impenetrable scrub".

In 1868 Surveyor E. S. Wyndham completed his survey including 62 portions situated at Mount Wilson, Parish of Irvine, County of Cook. Richard Wynne is listed in 1870 as living at Wynstay on Liverpool Road, Burwood between Drivers Road and Alt Street.

After an attempted sale by auction in April 1870, Wynne purchased six allotments of Wyndham's subdivisions between 1875 and 1876. In 1875 Richard Wynne completed his first term as Mayor of Burwood and that year built a cottage on his property at Mt. Wilson. Between 1876 and 1878 Wynne appears to have built a second, larger house called Yarrawa, which burned down in 1906. A photograph of this second house held by the Mount Wilson & Mt. Irvine Historical Society was taken by Bischoff, a photographer with Eccleston du Faur's expedition in the Grose Valley, dating it to well before 1893.

During this period Wynne is said to have employed a stonemason, John Rowland. The stables, gate lodge, the timber house now known as Old Wynstay and much of the crenulated stone walls were completed.

Between 1875 and 1879 the road towards Mount Irvine was resurveyed to skirt the top of the hill on which Wynstay now stands, presumably because the road surveyed by Wyndham was too steep. On 3 September 1879 the redundant section of old road, was purchased by Richard Wynne as the gates, Old Wynstay and much of the crenulated walls are located on this land.

In 1880 the name Yarrawa appears to have still been in use. Henry John Wynne (Richard Wynne's son) acquired portion 64 to the north of the old road by Crown grant in 1882. By this time, the portion was bisected by the Mount Irvine Road. The name Yarrawa was in use right up until 1921, as noted in the correspondence with Colonel Richard Owen Wynne.

Wynne's inventory of 1893 recorded the existence of the Turkish Bath, a house known as Wynstay and other buildings on the estate - unfortunately this 1893 inventory referred to has never been sighted since. In 1893 drawings for a "Turkish Bath in the Italianate style" were included in "The Settlement of Mt Wilson" by Fraser, James & Mack. There is some doubt about the drawings of the Turkish Bath in that thesis. They were not drawn by architect Earnest H. Bonney but more likely by the authors. Recent research indicates the Turkish Bath House was built (well) before 1890 - probably in the mid-1880s for use by Richard's wife Mary Anne, who had fallen into ill health and whose doctors had prescribed a course of Turkish baths. Mrs Wynne died in July 1889 of abdominal cancer.

On 15 June 1895 Richard Wynne died at Greta, Macdonald Street, Potts Point. Cause of death was listed as being senile decay, purpura and cerebral congestion. His wife, Mary Ann Neich was recorded as being deceased. Also recorded is that of their five male children, only one, Henry John Wynne, then aged 36 years age, was living.

On 16 April 1896 the Wynstay Estate was held in trust by the Perpetual Trustee Company, Sydney. On 22 January 1898 Henry John Wynne died at Mount Wilson aged 38 of chronic Bright's disease. The death certificate describes Henry as being of independent means, and the duration of his last illness one year. It also listed his children Richard O. and Dulcie M. as living and aged 5 and 3 respectively.

On 18 December 1913 Richard Owen Wynne Esq. of Watford, England, Richard Wynne's grandson, became the new owner of the Wynstay Estate. R. O. Wynne returned to Australia, c. 1920 with his English bride and in the same year work commenced on the construction of the present Wynstay, to the design of Joseland and Gilling Architects. The Turkish Bath was converted into living quarters for the three stonemasons constructing the new home. From c. 1920 to 1945 the Turkish Bath continued to be used as a residence and little or no further alteration to the building occurred during this time.

James Inglis, a new arrival in NSW in 1877 from India with a commission to write on the Australian colonies as a field for "Anglo-Indian capital", produced "Our Australian Cousins" in which he wrote in glowing terms of Mount Wilson. In 1880 he visited Edward Merewether (at Dennarque), describing the scene as he reached this four-hectare (ten-acre) block which today is at the top of the Lithgow Zig Zag:

"On the brow of the hill we come to a clearing of some 10 acres belonging to my friend. On which has been erected a neat weatherboard cottage. All the tall timber has been cut down, but the tree ferns have been left. Can you imagine ten acres of magnificent tree ferns? Nothing else to be seen? - they are as plentiful as cabbages in a garden bed. The sight was to me as rare as it was surpassingly beautiful." Inglis later referred to the stone residence at Dennarque and noted other nice houses, though chiefly of wood are being put up on various parts of the mountain - this beauteous retreat promises to become a favourite summer resort for the elite of Sydney."

Here is direct evidence of the pattern already apparent that Mount Wilson and the Blue Mountains had become the popular concept of a hill station, providing an escape from Sydney, Newcastle, Mulgoa and Mudgee to a health, mountainous environment during the hotter summer months for the families who built homes in Mount Wilson.

When Dennarque was owned by the Mann children (1924+) a guesthouse was established. After World War 1 the small Mt. Wilson community underwent considerable social and economic change. Some property owners chose to live on the mountain permanently to make a living from its rich basalt soil. These permanent settlers were to include Richard Owen Wynne (grandson of Richard Wynne) of Wynstay, Edward Jesse Gregson (son of Jesse Gregson) of Yengo, George Ernest Valder (son of George Valder who had bought Nooroo in 1917–18), Ivie Sloan (of Bebeah, bought in 1902) and Frederick Farrell Mann of Yengo (called Stone Lodge after 1923 when he purchased it from Edward Gregson).

Mt Wilson had acquired an attractive reputation for its rare beauty and its coolness in the summer and special environment bought visitors in small numbers. Tearooms and guesthouse accommodation emerged. An early map after World War 1 shows G Knight Brown running Campanella as a guesthouse (Wynne papers, Mitchell Library). Nooroo also had guests.

In 1922 a post office building containing a residence and officer, was constructed in The Avenue opposite Bebeah through funds provided by a number of local property owners forming a trust. In this building was a tearoom and, for a short period, a small general store. An extract from "The Blue Mountains Echo" in 1921:

"A Tourist's Paradise" There is only one Mount Wilson in NSW - No other is exactly like it - one of the principle glories of the Mount is its tree ferns. They are everywhere on the mountain top, in the gullies out in the sunlight."

The article describes the wonders of "Wynnestay its grounds are glorious, the beauty and diversity of foliage and form baffle description."

The guesthouses at Mt. Wilson became an attractive feature of holidaying in this rather isolated mountain retreat. They functioned on a modest scale bringing a rather select group of visitors. Meanwhile, a small number of property owners turned to orcharding to derive an income from this same mountain. Others, like the Whites of Withycombe, continued to use it as a summer retreat (Reynolds, 2009, 1,4-8, abridged)

Following the death of Colonel R.O. Wynne on 24 September 1968, his widow, Florence Mariamne Wynne, Sons Mervyn Owen and Ronald Michael Wynne and daughter Jane Mariamne Smart became the new owners of the estate.

On 3 May 1972 following the death of Colonel Wynne's widow, the three children inherited the estate. Gowan Ross Pty Ltd., established by the Smart family, purchased the estate.

c. 1980s polythene-clad tunnel houses in a nursery area east of the house were built by Bill Smart for use by the family nurseries. These were built on the site of the old tennis court. Bill Smart was interested in contemporary horticulture.

Historic notes: The property of Wynstay somprses the largest land holding in the town Mount Wilson. Richard Wynne, a successful Sydney businessman, built MOunt Wilson's first cottage, which he named Wynstay, in 1875. Wynne set out to establish a park-like estate on the property in the English pictureesue tradition. To this end he acquired the largest land holding in Mount Wilson, on top of a hill that is now a dominant position in the settlement. Wynne built a second and larger cottage. Yarawwa, and later a larger U-shaped timber residence with a verandah on the three sides. This structure served the needs of the Wynne family until 1923 when Richard Wynne's grandson built the present Wynstay, a large sandstone house in the Georgian Revival style. The property is today owned by Mr & Mrs Smart; Mrs Smart is a direct descendant of Richard Wynne.

== Description ==
=== Estate and grounds ===
Wynstay Estate comprises the top of the hill at Mount Wilson, ending the axial view up its main street. It's skirted by another road which winds to the east and west around the estate. The grounds contain a collection of 19th century tree plantings, most of which are foreign species. This includes a number of rare conifers. There are also constructed elements such as the Turkish Bathhouse and hexagonal stone gate house, which are visible from the road and partially visible through the foliage at other angles.

A series of drives and roads within the estate edged by c.1m tall crenellated rubble stone walls approach the main house via the Turkish Bath (western driveway), and more indirectly via a southern driveway which winds around the brow of the hilltop past stables, old Wynstay, the cottage and Gate House.

Plantings define field edges and garden "rooms" within this large area, in a most picturesque composition, no doubt deliberately intended to display Wynne's wealth and taste.

Elements of the estate include grazing fields, inner and outer garden areas, paved "courtyard" spaces both near the house and further out (south) in the garden, linking paths between buildings, and a more recent service and propagation area of polythene tube or tunnel houses east of the main house and on a lower terrace.

Key tree, shrub and other plantings include:

- Abies normanniana, Caucasian fir, fine specimen west of house on lawn;
- Picea smithiana, Himalayan spruce (2: one near the house; one near the stables block/Old Wynstay);
- Illicium anisatum, five spice bush;
- Daphne odora cv.'Rubra' and "Alba", pink and white daphne;
- Viburnum davidii;
- V.tinus, laurustinus;
- Chamaecyparis lawsoniana, Lawson's false cypress (several, very large - one behind (south of) the house is multi-trunked as its lower branches have rooted in the ground and their tips have kept growing forming a circular grove;
- New Zealand species such as:
- Pittosporum eugenioides, tarata/lemonwood;
- Corokia cotoneaster, korokio;
- Cordyline australis, ti kauka/cabbage tree;
- Libocedrus plumosa, kawaka/native cedar (several, in pairs, planted formally);
- Griselinia lucida, puka/broadleaf;
- Nothofagus fusca, red beech;
- Pinus griffithii/P.wallichiana, Bhutan pine (long needles, 20–30 cm cone, curved, hanging);
- P.ponderosa, Western yellow pine;
- Picea abies "Inversa", dwarf drooping Norway spruce - on a raised driveway bed near the Turkish Bath House;
- Cedrus deodara, Himalayan cedar;
- C.atlantica and C.a.'Glauca', Atlas and blue Atlas cedar (very tall specimen near the stables block);
- Pinus ponderosa;
- Cupressus macrocarpa, Monterey cypress (avenue/former windbreak?) adjoining the stables/central drive on hill top);
- C.m.'Aurea', golden Monterey cypress
- Araucaria bidwillii, Bunya Bunya pine (2);
- Arbutus unedo, Mediterranean /'Irish' strawberry tree (several - almost a weed says the owner);
- Sequoiadendron giganteum, redwood/big tree;
- Sequoia sempervirens "Glauca", blue form of coastal redwood (2 in paddock);
- Kalmia latifolia, calico bush (several);
- Cornus Florida, Florida/eastern dogwood;
- Cryptomeria japonica, tsugi/Japanese cedar;
- C.j.'Vilmoriniana', dwarf ";
- Hamamaelis mollis, witch hazel;
- Erythronium dens-canis, dog-toothed violets;
- Daphne cneorum;
- D.odora "Albo-variegata", variegated daphne;
- Magnolia grandiflora, evergreen magnolia/bull bay (large specimen);
- M.denudata, Yulan tree;
- M.x soulangeana, tree tulip;
- M.x loebnerii (8 x 12m specimen);
- Garrya elliptica, catkin bush;
- Stachyurus praecox;
- Prunus x serrulata cv.s, flowering cherries;
- P.laurocerasus, cherry laurel;
- Azalea mollis cv.s; deciduous/Mollis azaleas (many);
- Rhododendron indicum cv.s, azaleas (many);
- R.species (many, including R.ponticum; R.augustinii (blue); R.fragrantissimum (white, scented);
- Pieris forrestii (giant lily-of-the-valley bush);
- P.japonica & P.j.'Variegata' (" ");
- Ilex aquifolium cv.s (hollies);
- Hydrangea petiolaris, climbing hydrangea;
- H.macrophylla cv.s, hydrangeas (many);
- Tsuga canadensis "Pendula" (weeping hemlock);
- Picea albertiana "Glauca Conica", dwarf spruce;
- Euonymus pendula;
- Picea mariana, black spruce (near/west of the house and the Caucasian fir) (closer to the driveway)).

"Mimi's Garden / Italian Garden (walled garden south of the house):

- Ivy (Hedera helix) clad mesh walls;
- Florentine cast iron gates brought from Florence, Italy
- a statue in the basin in the centre of the garden.

Weeds in the garden include ivy, holly, Himalayan dogwood (Cornus capitata); honeysuckle and privet.

=== Buildings ===
The Original Cottage

This is an example of the Victorian Carpenter Gothic style; 1875 - a simple weatherboard residence that remains intact and in fair condition.

Yarrawa/(now) Old Wynstay

This is a modest example of the Victorian vernacular: c. 1890 weatherboard, u-shape plan arrangement; in fair condition and intact. A good example of a late 19th c. Gothic style, weatherboard cottage used as an early mountain retreat (LEP).

The Stables

This is a fine example of the Federation Gothic style with Norman influences. The basalt and sandstone building features crenellated parapet walls. The building is in good condition and retains much of the original fabric and integrity. Behind (south of) the stables are a domed brick water tank and a horse gang.

The Turkish Bath

This is an example of the Federation Free Classical style with an infusion of Italianate stylising. Built pre-1890-93. The bricks were made by Wynne. The building is in good condition and retains a substantial proportion of original fabric and integrity. Recent research indicates the Turkish Bath house was built (well) before 1890 for use by Richard Wynne's wife Mary Anne, who had fallen into ill health and whose doctors had prescribed a course of Turkish baths. Mrs Wynne died in July 1889 of abdominal cancer. Surviving Victorian Turkish baths are extremely rare in Australia - Dunmore station in Western Victoria has one made of basalt. It was built in 1866 by Charles Hamilton Macknight who also used it to bathe his sheep.

The Lodge or Gatehouse

This is a hexagonal-shaped Federation sandstone building with great emphasis placed on solar planning principles to admit natural light to a central core surrounding a fireplace. The building is intact and in good condition.

A nearby stone wall appears to be remnant section of another early outbuilding / storage shed (close to the gates and lodge/gate house) which partially collapsed in 2009 (grant application, 1/2011)

The Wynstay residence

This is a two-storey, face sandstone building designed by Joseland & Gilling architects in the Inter-War Georgian Revival style. The original integrity and fabric of the building is superb.

=== Physical description ===
The property of Wynstay occupies a dominant position on top of a hill at the end of The Avenue at Mount Wilson. The original cottage Wynstay, and the second Wynstay, a U-Shaped timber residence surrounded on three sides by verandahs, still remain on the site. The main house Wynstay, a sandstone Georgian Revival manor house, is sited above the northern boundary of the property. The grounds of Wynstay are bordered by extensive stone walling which runs in a semicircle on the western side of the property. At the end of The Avenue are a set of stone gate posts incorporating decorative wrought iron work, and beside the main gate stands a pentagonal stone gate lodge. From the gate lodge run remnants of a carriage drive that continued along a terrace with almost a mile of rubble walling before arriving at the stables. The stables building is constructed on a U-Shaped plan and built randomly of coursed basalt with some dressed sandstone. This structure includes battlements and crenellations which match the stone walling which runs around the boundary of the garden. A Turkish bath house of decorative brickwork, wrought iron and ceramic floor tiles is sited below the northern wall of the garden.

=== Design elements ===
The garden is laid out in the style of an English park estate, in the picturesque or gardenesque style. The various structures (gate House, stables and Turkish bath house) serve as picturesque elements in the garden of Wynstay. Richard Wynne's siting of these structures, and the three houses built in the grounds, did not address the spectacular views to the north of the property over the Wolleongambe Wilderness. The natural landscape was deliberately kept separate from the picturesque garden that Wynne created within the circular walk which defines the garden and grounds. The main house, Wynstay of 1923, is however sited to address these views rather than the garden. The garden is dominated by mature conifers including Wellingtonia (Sequoiadendron giganteum), Lason Cyress (Chamaecyparis lawsonia), Himalayan Spruce (Picea smithiana) with specimen plantings of Caucasian (Abies nordmanniana) and Blue Atlas Cedar ( Cedrus atlantica 'glauca'). In the areas surrounding the garden are stands of Pinus radiata, Pinus macrocarpa and Pinus ponderosa. In addition, the garden contains many deciduous trees that provide a colourful display during autumn. These include Copper beech (Fangus sylvatica 'purpurea'). English Oak (Quercus robur), Pin Oak (Quercus palustris) and Red Oak (Quercus rubra), with numerous varieties of Maple, Chestnut, Magnolia, Cherry and Dogwood. The front of the old Wynstay cottage consists of mostly over-mature shrubbery. The surviving shrubs from this early period of garden development include Hydrangea hortensis. Viburnum davidii, Viburnum tinus, Ilex aquifolium (holly), Magnolia stellata (star magnolia), with varieties of Camelia, Buddleia, Deutzia, Exochordia and Laburnum. Azaleas also grow around the old cottage. These are mostly pink and white early Belgian hybrids of which the names are now lost. Other warly paintings wtill existing on the site are stands of Cordyline australis (NZ Cabbage tree/ti kouka), and an extensive understorey planting of an unnamed Rhododendron cultivar dating from the 1880s. Some garden ornament survives from the 1880s mostly of an Italiannate style, including a nineteenth century terracotta Venus figure. Two urns manufactured by Goodlet and Smith of Sydney front the stairs leading to the cottage. In the 1920s further ornament was incorporated. The old conservatory with its roof removed was developed as a walled garden that includes a large water tub planted with lotus, with a bronze cherub at its centre. A larger walled garden called the sunken garden was paved in brick.

=== Modifications and dates ===
- 1875 first cottage built
- 1875-9: road to Mount Irvine resurfaced to skirt Wynstay's hilltop position on Mt.Wilson.
- 1875-93: second cottage "Yarrawa" built; stables, stone gate lodge, timber house (now called 'Old Wynstay') and much of the crenellated stone work estate walls were built.
- 3 September 1879: Wynne bought the redundant section of the old road (now the site of the gates, Old Wynstay and much of the stone walls).
- 1882: H.J. Wynne (Richard's son) bought portion 64 to the north of the old road by a Crown grant, which by this time was bisected by Mt. Irvine Road.
- pre-1890-93: Turkish Bath House drawings done, implying it was built in this period.
- 1895 Richard Wynne died (his wife was dead already and of their five male children only H.J. Wynne was living (born 1859).
- 16 April 1896 Wynstay was held in trust
- 22 January 1898: H.J. Wynne died (children R.O. Wynne (born 1893) and D.M. Wynne (born 1895) were five and three respectively).
- 1906 Yarrawa burnt down.
- 18 December 1913 Colonel R.O. Wynne (Richard's grandson in England) became the new owner.
- c. 1920 Col. Wynne came to Australia with his English bride. Work started on the present house, designed by Joseland & Gilling architects. The Turkish Bath house was converted into living quarters for three stonemasons building the new house.
- c. 1923 the new house was completed (Nat.Trust (NSW) classification).
- 24 September 1968 Col. Wynne died and his three children inherited the estate.
- c. 1980s polythene-clad tunnel houses in a nursery area east of the house on site of old tennis court.
- 16 April 1996: Wynstay held in trust for heirs.
- 1996 Ornamental garden urn repaired with funding from Australian Garden History Society (Sydney & Northern NSW Branch).
- 2007: large Himalayan cedar (Cedrus deodara) probably c.1880s/1890s just beside Old Wynstay was hit by lightning in 2006, one of its trunks shattered and threatened to collapse on the old house. The tree was taken down in 2007 by Ryde TAFE arboriculture students. A nearby brick kiln was built when Jane Wynne and her classmates had lessons from Fred Mann, the potter of nearby Cherry Cottage.
- May 2007: Another large tree, a blackwood (Acacia melanoxylon) collapsed in a storm on the back half of an old corrugated iron shed in the Wynstay paddock. The shed has always been called the blacksmith's shop. It is believed to have been used in Richard Wynne's time to create and repair tools and other farm equipment, decorative iron fences and railings.

Installation of 470-litre (100 imp gal; 120 US gal) rainwater tank and stand beneath original tank stand providing a supply to the Turkish Bath house.

- 2010: a new roof on the Turkish Bath, just this month; heavy duty galvanised steel specially rolled to the original profile at Fielders in Adelaide. The timber on the bath house tower also had a facelift.

== Heritage listing ==
As at 7 April 2006, the Wynstay Estate, settled c. 1875 by Richard Wynne and comprising the original cottage, Old Wynstay, The Stables, The Turkish Bath, The Lodge, Wynstay residence and a large area of gardens, represents an early and highly intact Hill Station landscape estate with a collection of buildings in diverse architectural styles and a collection of plantings befitting Wynne's vision of an English park.

Wynstay has aesthetic significance as its character, planning, and the quality of the architecture and landscaping deliberately seeks to establish the qualities of affluence and opulence; a private "retreat". The architectural styles, use of materials and the functionality of the buildings, along with the rich plant collection including trees, to shrubs, perennials, climbers and bulb layers create an idealised, romantic and sometimes fanciful recreation of an English rural estate.

Wynstay has historic significance to the locality as one of the early European hill station properties on Mount Wilson and is rare as a relatively intact, large original hill station remaining in the same original family's ownership. Of particular importance is the presence of the first Gothic style cottage built by Richard Wynne, the larger Victorian cottage Yarrawa / Old Wynstay, and the 1923 sandstone house that demonstrate progressive development of the site by the Wynne family from the late 19th to the early 20th century. The garden elements such as the stone and wrought iron gates, crenellated rubble dry stone walling and stables, Turkish Bath House and collection of specimen trees, avenues, dell and sunken garden demonstrate extraordinary richness rare in gardens of this period.

Wynstay has historic significance due to its association and establishment by Richard Wynne, a prosperous merchant who became a prominent citizen of Victorian Sydney, whose descendants continue ownership of the property.

Wynstay Estate was listed on the New South Wales State Heritage Register on 12 April 2002 having satisfied the following criteria.

The place is important in demonstrating the course, or pattern, of cultural or natural history in New South Wales.

As a rare substantially intact example of a gentlemen's "Hill Station" retreat, owned and occupied almost continuously by the one family since its establishment in 1870, the Wynstay estate is of State significance. As possibly the oldest surviving building in Mt Wilson, the cottage is of local significance. (Design 5 Architects)

Evidence of adaptation and change manifest in the buildings, artefacts and landscape is of significance as a record of changing tastes and technologies from 1870 to the present day. It may also have greater significance as evidence of particular events in the Wynne family history. (Design 5 Architects)

The place has a strong or special association with a person, or group of persons, of importance of cultural or natural history of New South Wales's history.

The Wynstay Estate was established by Richard Wynne, a prosperous merchant who became a prominent citizen in Sydney and at one time the Mayor of Burwood municipality. Wynne was a pioneer settler of Mount Wilson and also the founder of the Wynne Prize for Landscape Painting and Sculpture at the Art Gallery of New South Wales. As evidence of Wynne's occupation of the site and his personal vision of an ideal landscape, the estate is of State significance. (Design 5 Architects)

The place is important in demonstrating aesthetic characteristics and/or a high degree of creative or technical achievement in New South Wales.

The Turkish Bath is a rare intact example of a purpose-built private Turkish Bath in Australia, and survives substantially intact. The building is an unusually fine example of late Victorian boom style architecture with polychrome brickwork and Italianate details. The evidence of its operation is of high technological significance and is extremely rare in Australia, possibly unique.

Interest in Turkish Baths in Australia appears to have developed shortly after their reintroduction in England (into Ireland in 1860 then later in the north of England: the first introduction to England was in the 17th century). In the late 19th century, two public Turkish Baths were known to have operated in Sydney, and two in Melbourne. Only one other surviving private Turkish Bath is known in Australia, on Dunmore station near Broadwater in Victoria.

Wynstay (the house) is a handsome, robust example of inter war Georgian Revival architecture, designed by the prominent Sydney architectural firm, Joseland & Gilling.

As a significant group of buildings, structures, artefacts and gardens set in the mountain landscape in the romantic style, the Wynstay estate is of local aesthetic significance.

The gate lodge and stables are significant examples of 19th century pattern book architecture.

The place has a strong or special association with a particular community or cultural group in New South Wales for social, cultural or spiritual reasons.

Evidence of adaptation and change manifest in the buildings, artefacts and landscape is of significance as a record of changing tastes and technologies from 1870 to the present day. It may also have greater significance as evidence of particular events in the Wynne family history.

The place possesses uncommon, rare or endangered aspects of the cultural or natural history of New South Wales.

Wynstay as a hill station property of some scale remaining in the same original family is now rare in New South Wales. In addition, surviving Turkish Bath Houses are extremely rare in Australia - Dunmore station in Western Victoria has one made of basalt, c. 1866.
