= Mount Tomah =

- Town
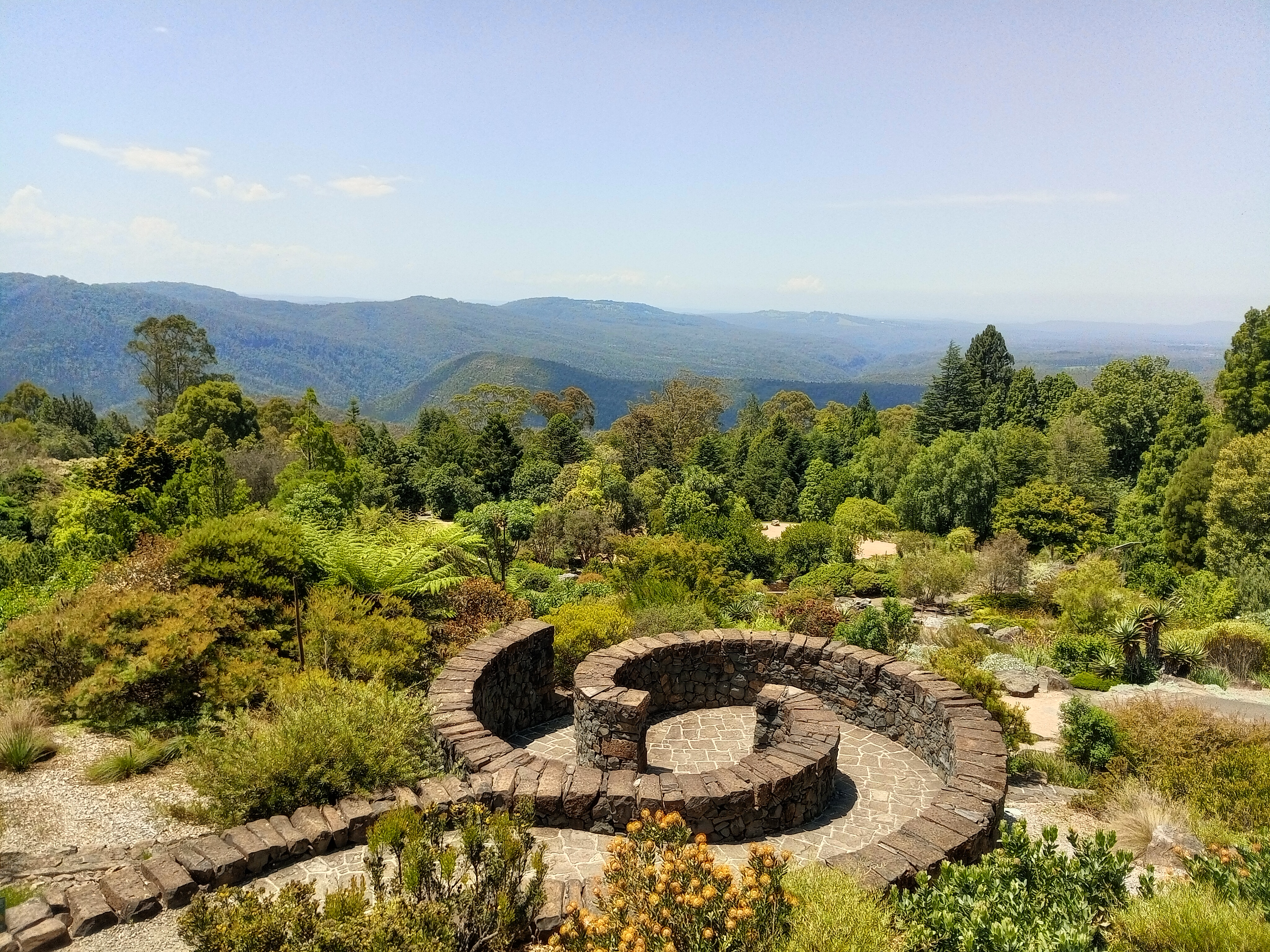
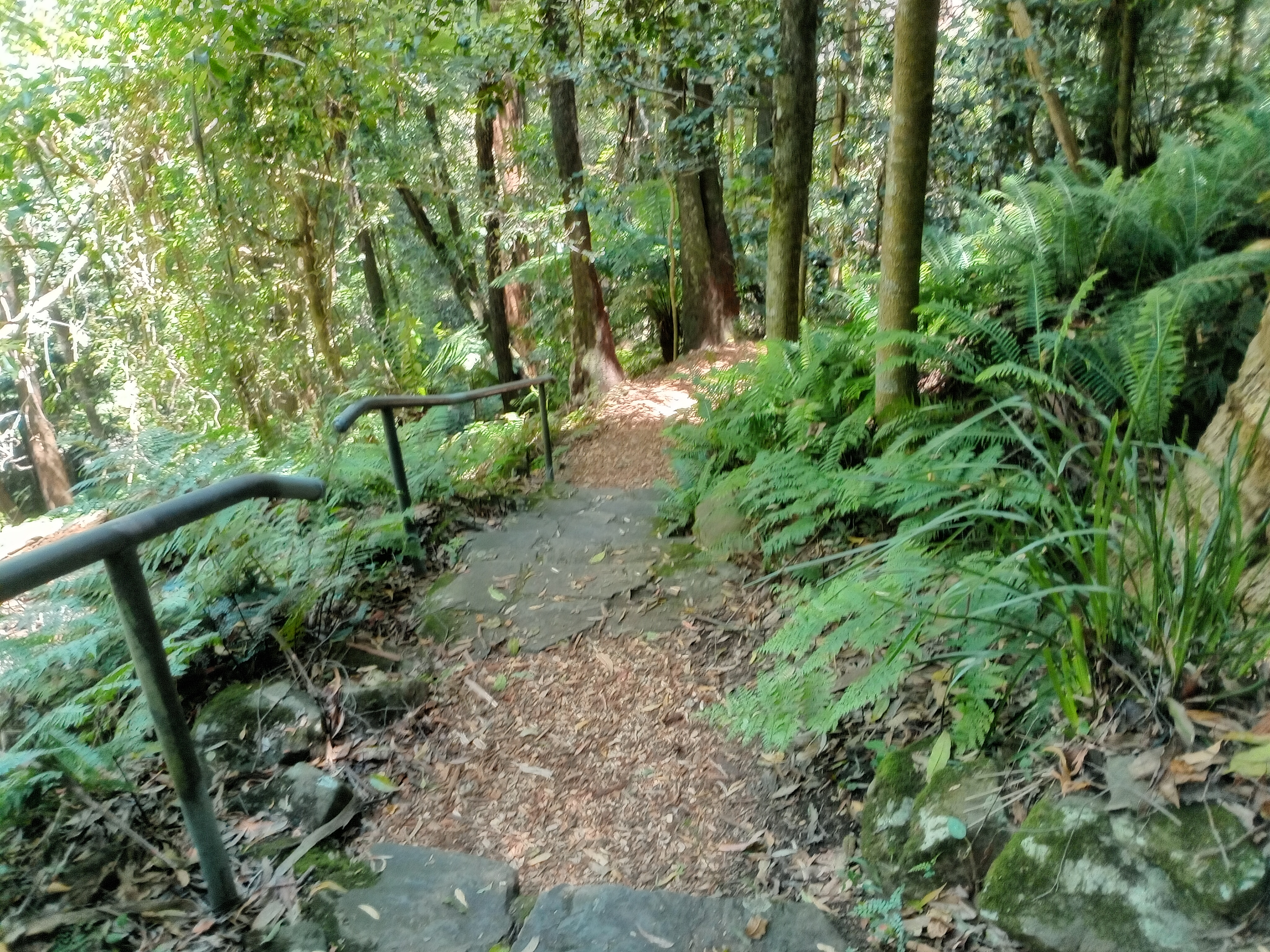
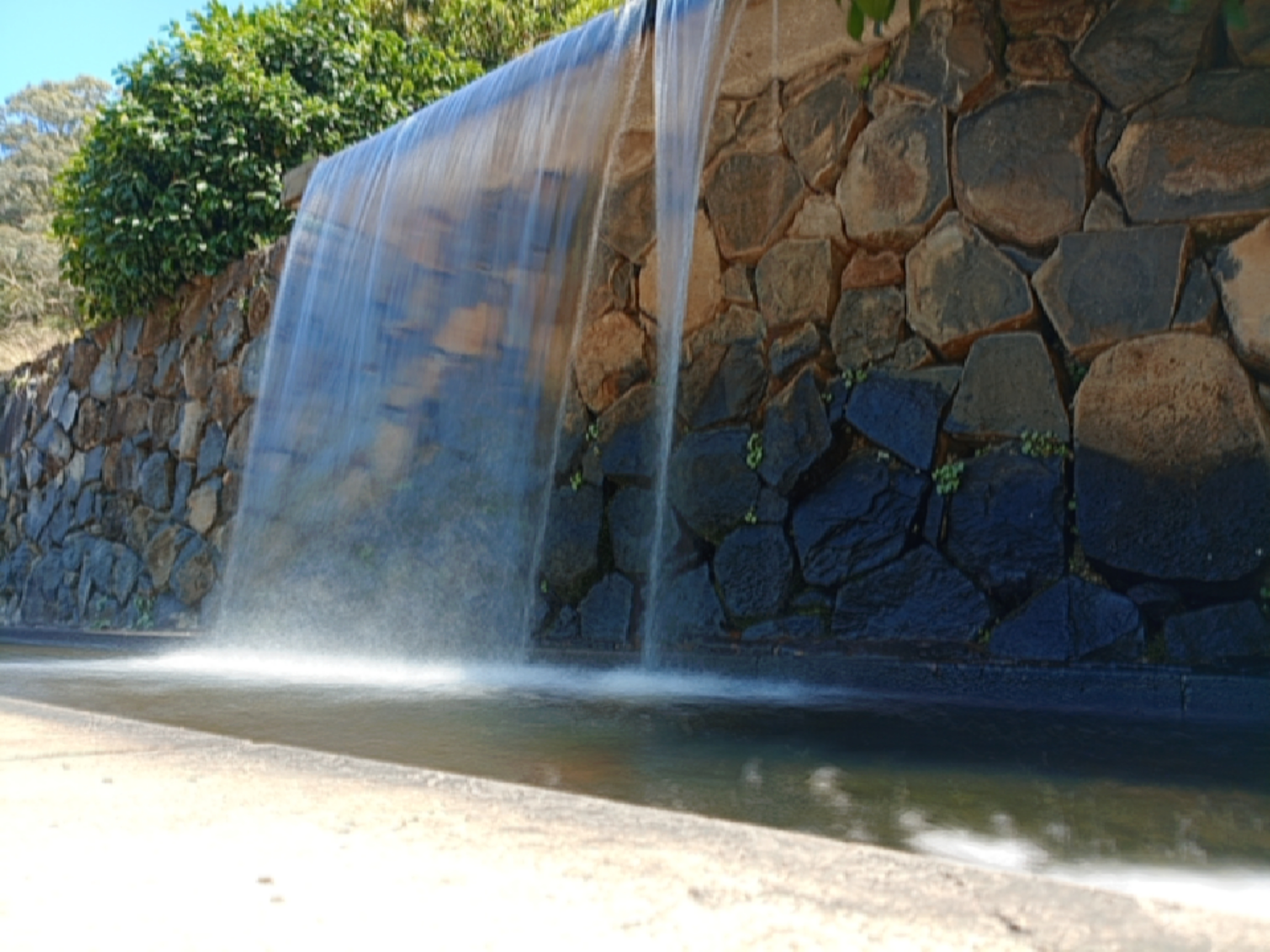
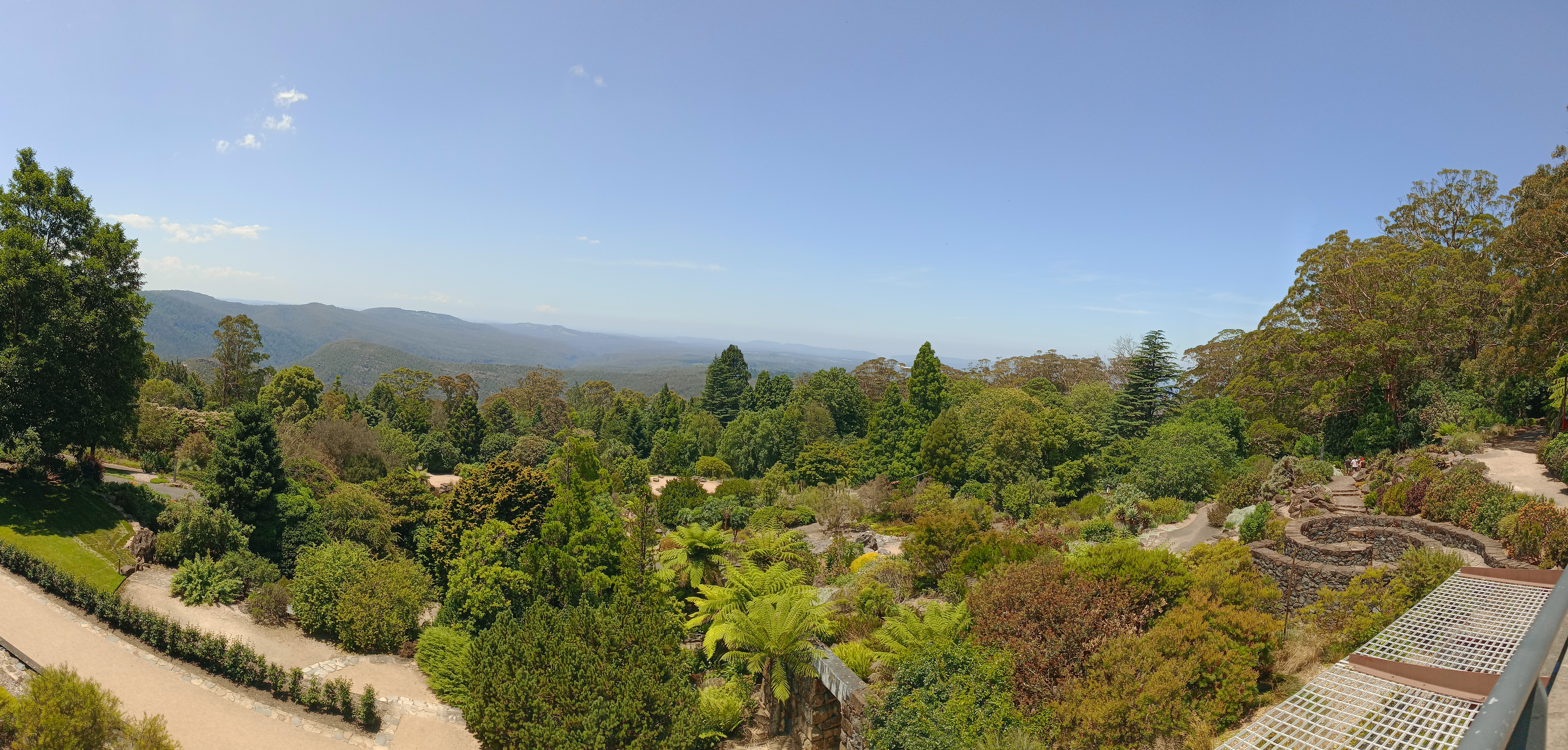
- The Blue Mountains Botanic Garden Forest Walk Mt Tomah Waterfalls Panoramic shot of the view from the summit
- Country: Australia
- State: New South Wales
- LGA: Blue Mountains City
- Location: 103 km (64 mi) west of Sydney CBD; 38 km (24 mi) east of Lithgow

Government
  - State electorate: Blue Mountains
  - Federal division: Macquarie
- Elevation: 991 m (3,251 ft)

Population
  - Total: 76 (Census Data 2,016)
- Postcode: 2758
Localities around Mount Tomah
| Mount Wilson | Mount Irvine | Berambing |
| Mount Banks | Mount Tomah | Berambing |
| Blue Mountains National Park | Blue Mountains National Park | Blue Mountains National Park |

Mount Tomah
- Location within New South Wales

Highest point
- Elevation: 1,016 m (3,333 ft)
- Parent peak: Bell Range
- Coordinates: 33°33′S 150°25′E

Geography
- Location: Blue Mountains, New South Wales, Australia

Mount Tomah is a locality and a mountain that is located in the Blue Mountains region of the state of New South Wales, Australia. The locality is known for the Blue Mountains Botanic Garden on the Bells Line of Road. The village has multiple Blue Mountains walking tracks, of which some are heritage-listed.

== Description ==
The village of Mount Tomah is located approximately 40 kilometres (25 mi) west of Richmond, on the Bells Line of Road. Its most distinguished feature, the Blue Mountains Botanic Garden, is located on the north side of that road. The garden was established in 1972. Apart from the gardens, the area is a low-density residential area. The fertile soils are derived from volcanic activity.

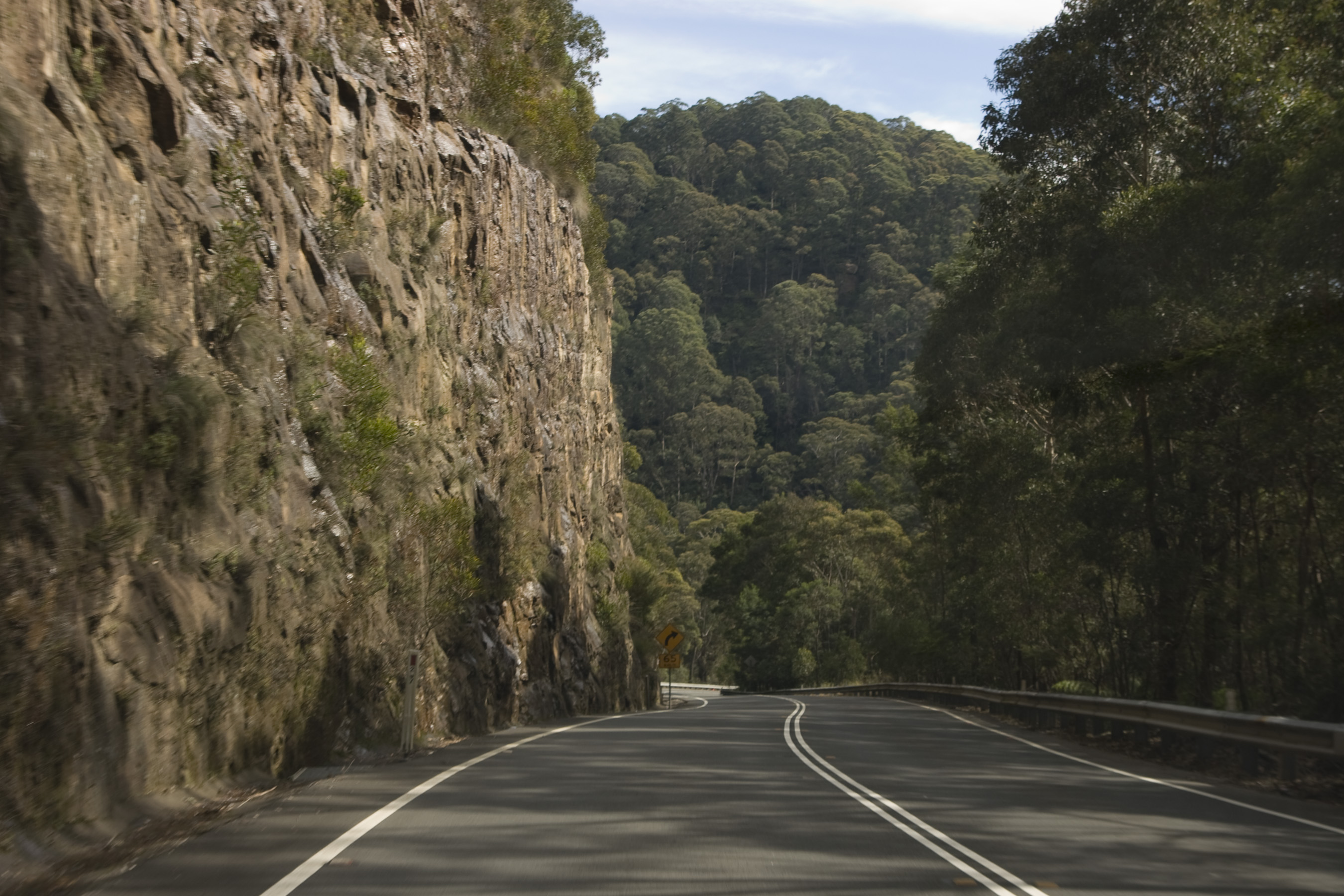
Bells Line of Road, Mt. Tomah

The peak of Mount Tomah is 1,016 metres (3,333 ft) above sea level.

== Heritage listings ==
Mount Tomah has a number of heritage-listed sites, including:

- Blue Mountains National Park: Blue Mountains walking tracks

== See also ==
- List of mountains of Australia § New South Wales
- Cephalofovea tomahmontis – a species named after Mount Tomah
