= Mount Wilson, New South Wales =

Mount Wilson
- Town
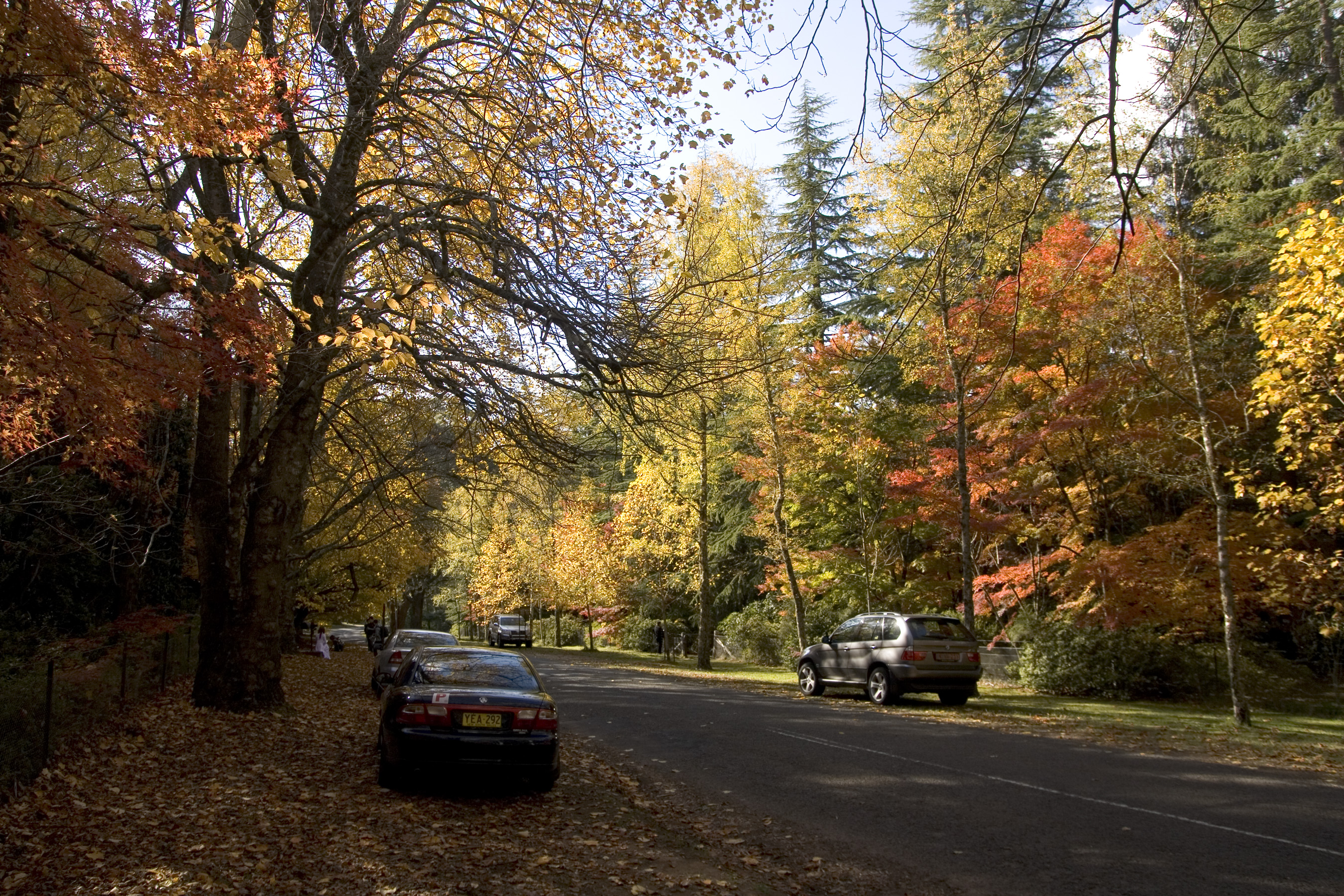
- Autumn foliage at Mount Wilson
- Interactive map of Mount Wilson
- Country: Australia
- State: New South Wales
- LGA: City of Blue Mountains
- Location: 130 km (81 mi) NW of Sydney CBD; 34 km (21 mi) E of Lithgow
- Established: 1880

Government
  - State electorate: Blue Mountains
  - Federal division: Macquarie
- Elevation: 1,008 m (3,307 ft)

Population
  - Total: 81 (2021 census)
- Postcode: 2786
Localities around Mount Wilson
Bell	Blue Mountains National Park	Mount Irvine
Bell	Mount Wilson	Mount Irvine
Blue Mountains National Park	Mount Tomah	Mount Tomah

Mount Wilson
- Location within New South Wales

Highest point
- Elevation: 1,008 m (3,307 ft)
- Parent peak: Bell Range
- Coordinates: 33°31′S 150°22′E

Geography
- Location: Blue Mountains, New South Wales, Australia

Mount Wilson is a village in the Blue Mountains region of New South Wales, Australia. The village is about 14 kilometres (8.7 mi) east of the township of Bell, and about 100 kilometres (62 mi) west of the Sydney CBD. At the 2021 census, the village of Mount Wilson had a population of 81 people. Mount Wilson is known for its multiple large ornate gardens, walks and access to nature, and popularity as a base for canyoning.

== Description ==
Mount Wilson is a long, low mountain formation that sprawls for 5 kilometres (3.1 mi) in the northern Blue Mountains area. It is completely surrounded by the Blue Mountains National Park, a World Heritage Area. It has been partly developed as a residential area, with elaborate gardens that have become a tourist attraction. The area is particularly popular in the autumn when the red and orange leaves give it extra colour. According to some, the "well-organised locals have managed to resist the tidal wave of development which swept through the other mountain towns."

== History ==
The Mount Wilson area was surveyed in 1868 by Edward Wyndham. It was subsequently named after Bowie Wilson, the then Secretary for Lands in the Government of New South Wales. The new township became popular as a summer retreat for the wealthy in the latter part of the 19th century. Extensive gardens were planted around the houses there, taking advantage of the volcanic soils. Historical features that can still be seen include St George's Church, which was built by the children of Henry Marcus Clark and consecrated in 1916; and the house Withycombe, in The Avenue, which was built by George Henry Cox, a grandson of William Cox, who built the first road over the Blue Mountains.

The novelist Patrick White spent some of his youth there, writing about the place in his 1981 memoir Flaws in the Glass; his parents had lived in Mount Wilson between 1912 and 1937. In Flaws in the Glass, he referred to "one of those tedious Australian, would-be tourists attractions called Chinaman's Hat," a reference to a local rock formation.

== Heritage listings ==
Mount Wilson has a number of heritage-listed sites, including:

- 68-78 The Avenue: Wynstay Estate

== Activities ==
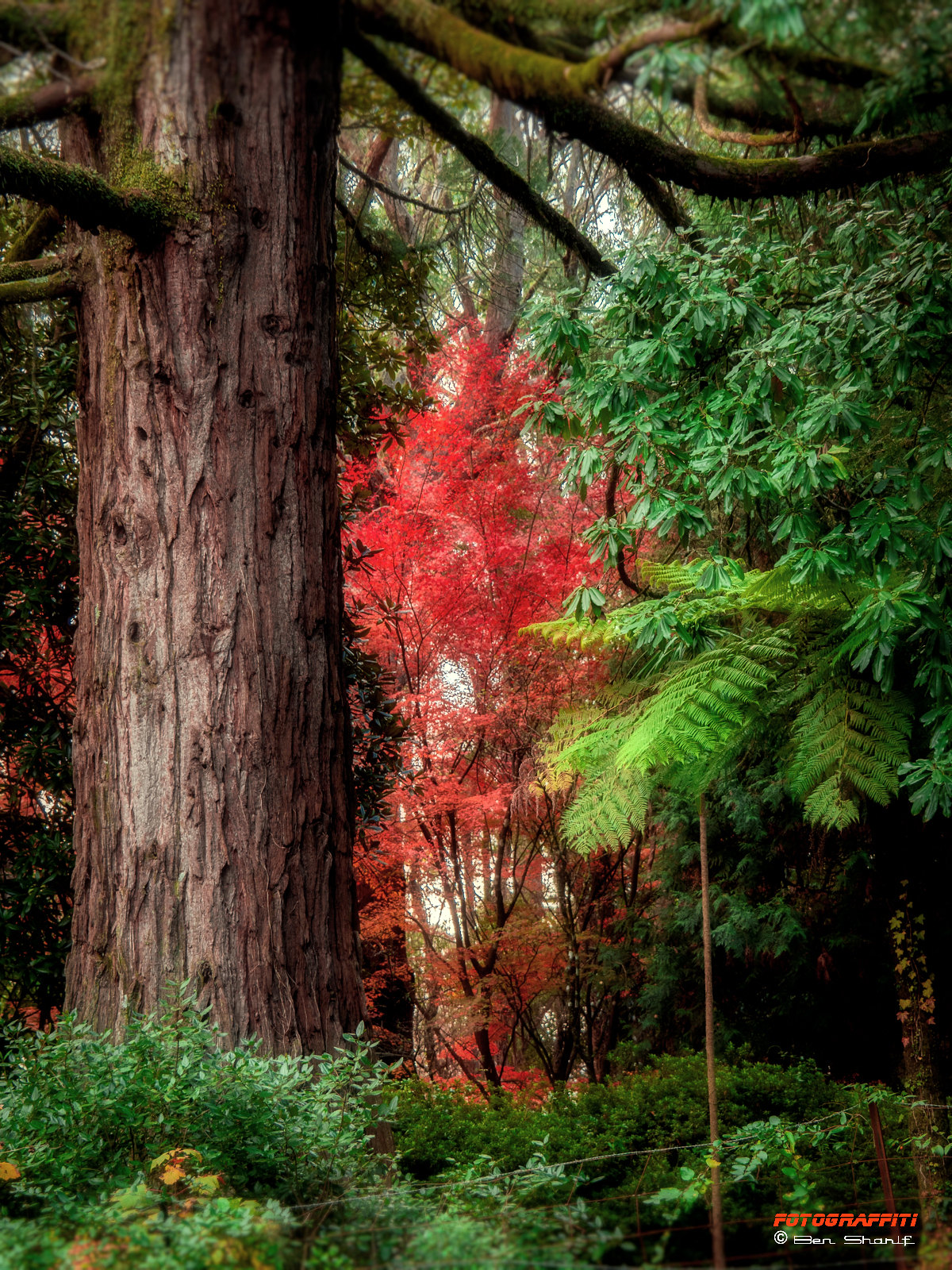
Autumn colour in Mount Wilson, New South Wales, Australia

Apart from visiting the gardens for which the area is famous, it is also possible to do a number of walks in places like Waterfall Reserve, the rainforest pocket in Davies Lane, the Cathedral of Ferns, Pheasants Cave, Chinamans Hat and, for more experienced walkers, the track to the Wollangambe River. The Mount Wilson area is a popular spot for canyoning, with many technical and non-technical sandstone canyons in the area. There are also lookouts, e.g. Wynnes Rocks Lookout and Du Faurs Rocks Lookout. There are no authorised camping areas, but it is possible to camp in the Waterfall Reserve picnic area. The area offers plenty of scope for photography. The village offers some cycling on the quiet roads, outside of busy autumn and spring weekends. The 10 km ride to Mt Irvine offers experienced cyclists a ride on bitumen road through rainforest and Blue Mountains Ash forests.

== Gallery ==
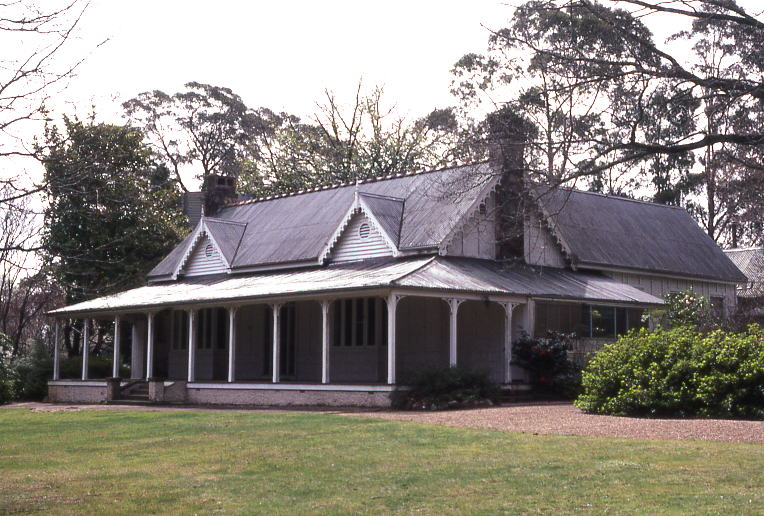
Withycombe, built by George Henry Cox

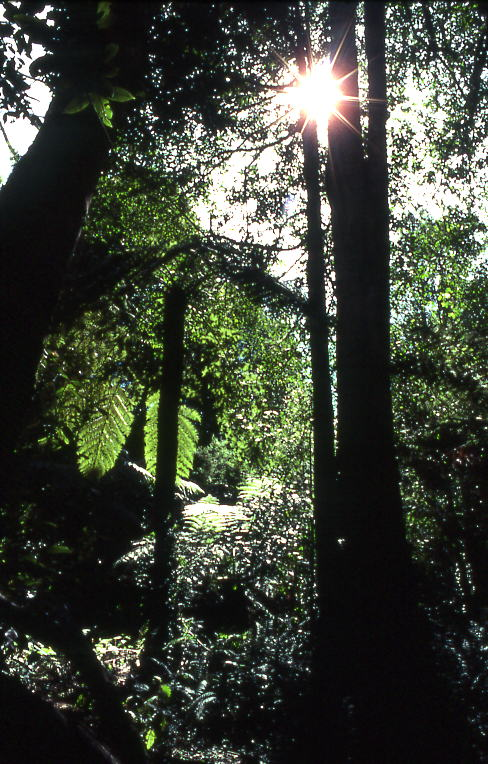
Cathedral of Ferns

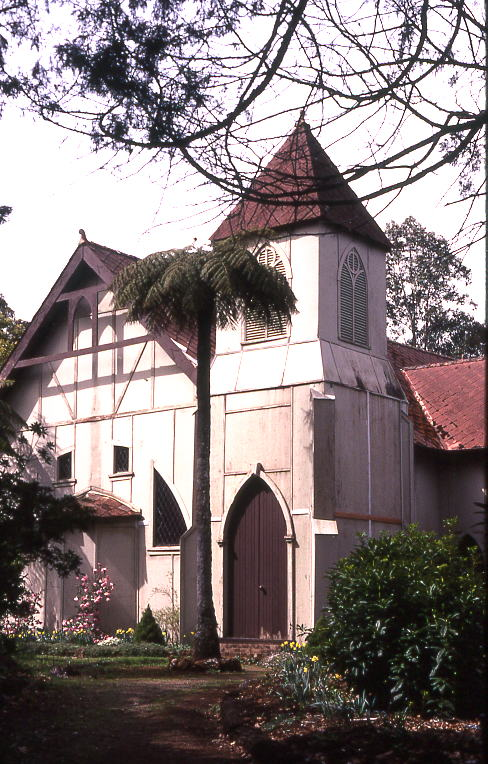
St George's Church

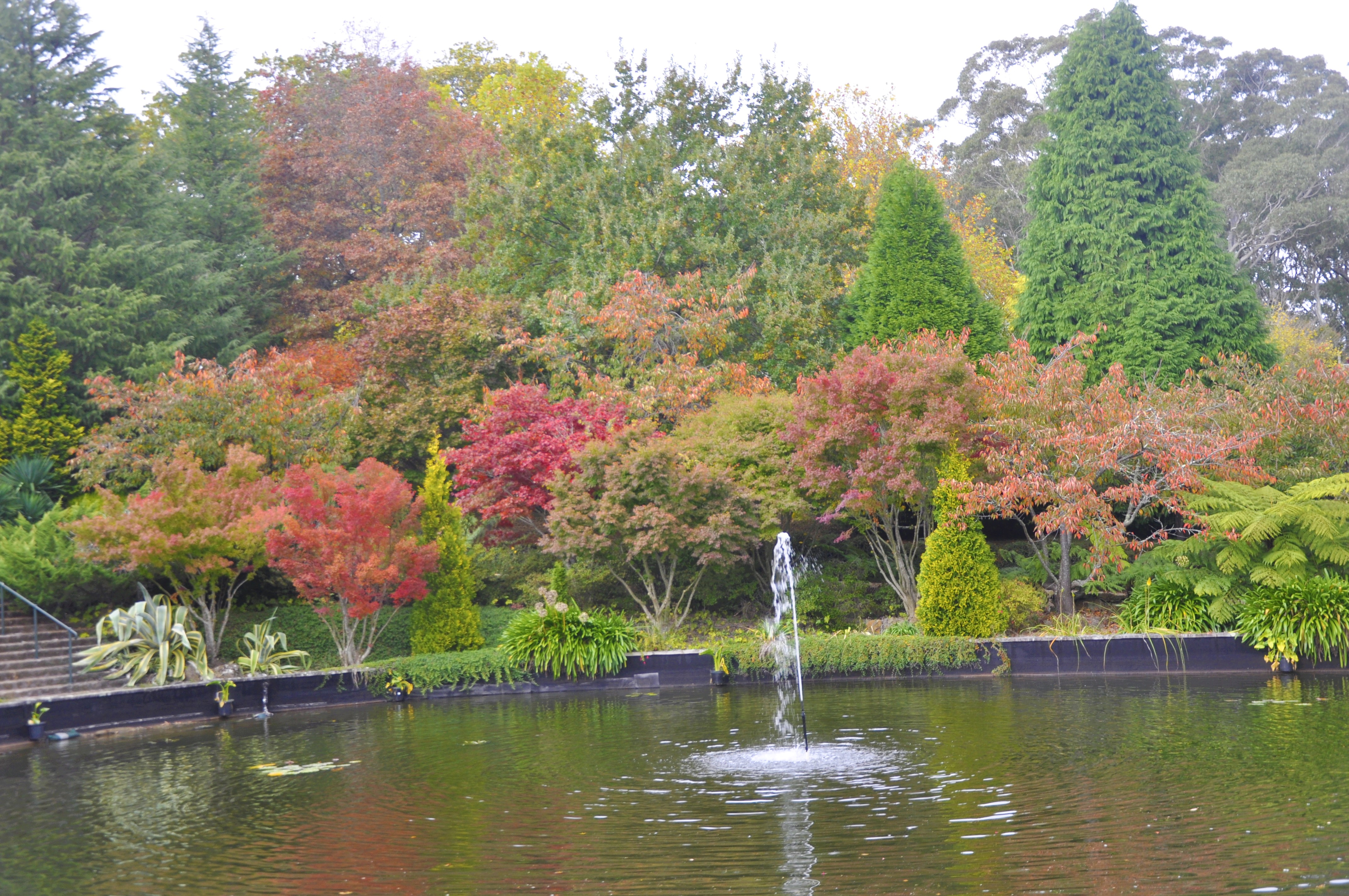
The autumn colour of the Bebeah Private Garden

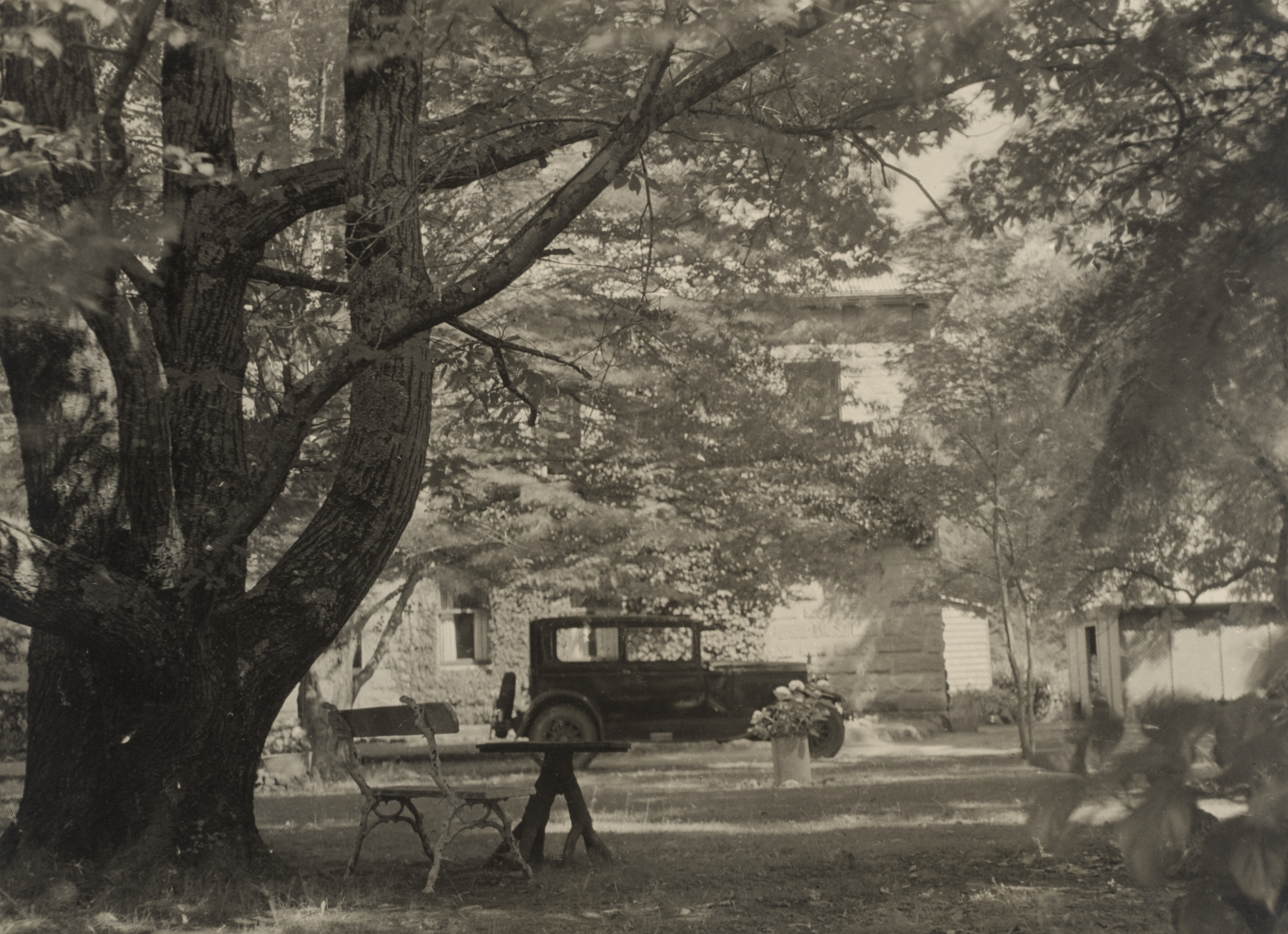
Dennarque Estate at Mt Wilson, New South Wales, c. 1925

== See also ==
- List of mountains in New South Wales
