= Blue Mountains Botanic Garden =

Place in New South Wales, Australia

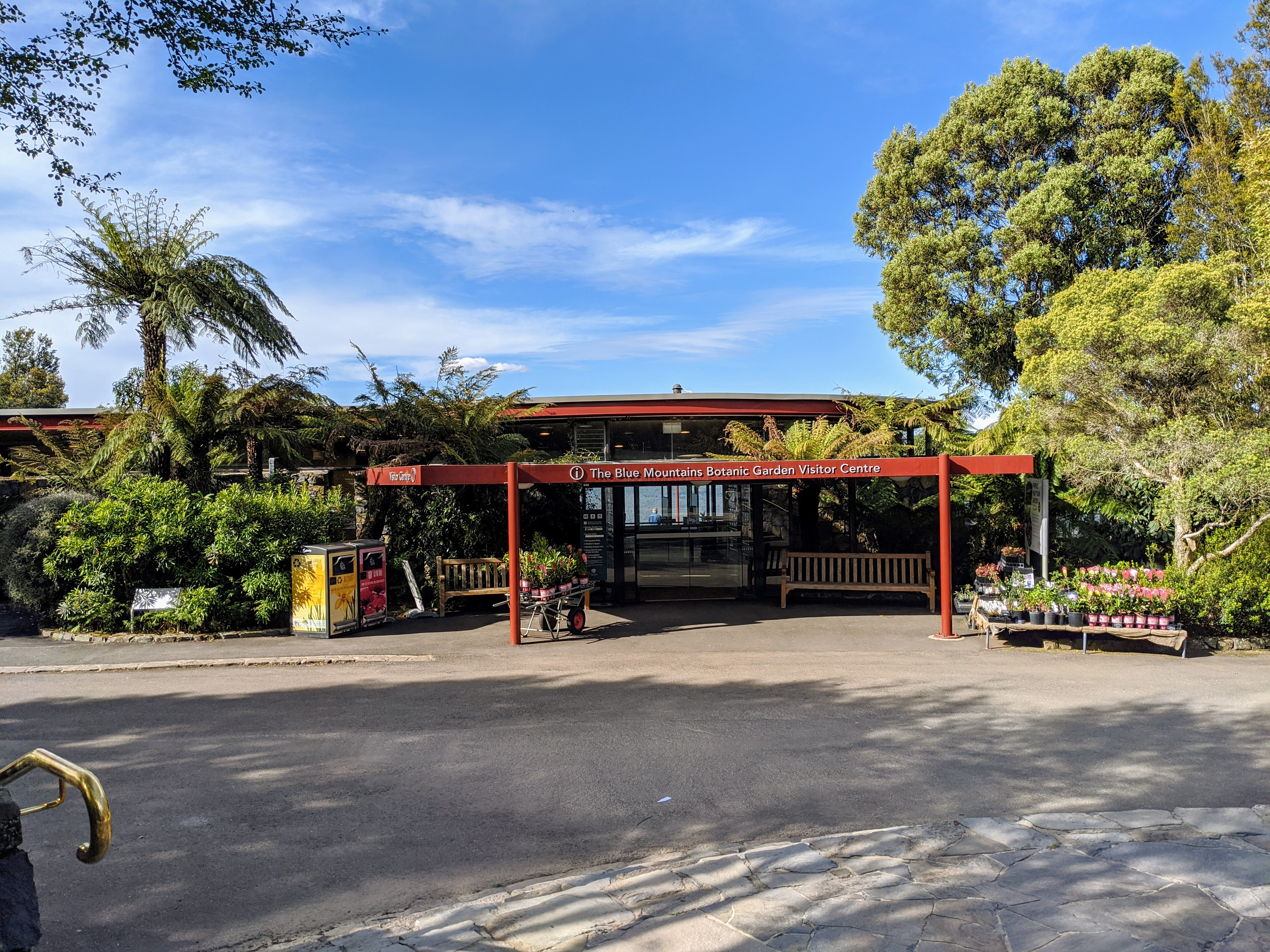
- The Blue Mountains Botanic Garden visitor's centre

- Location within New South Wales
- Location: Mount Tomah, Blue Mountains, New South Wales, Australia
- Nearest city: Sydney
- Coordinates: 33°32′21″S 150°25′21″E
- Area: 28 hectares (69 acres)
- Elevation: 1,000 metres (3,300 ft) AHD
- Opened: 1972
- Operator: The Botanic Gardens Trust trading the Botanic Gardens & Centennial Parklands
- Visitors: 158,512 (in 2016)
- Status: Open all year
- Designation: New South Wales Heritage Register
- Website: www.botanicgardens.org.au

The Blue Mountains Botanic Garden, originally known as the Mount Tomah Botanical Garden, is a 28-hectare (69-acre) public botanic garden located approximately 100 kilometres (62 mi) west of the Sydney central business district at Mount Tomah in the Blue Mountains, in New South Wales, Australia. The garden is heritage-listed and is located on the boundary of the UNESCO World Heritage Site Greater Blue Mountains Area and can be accessed via the Bells Line of Road.

== Description ==
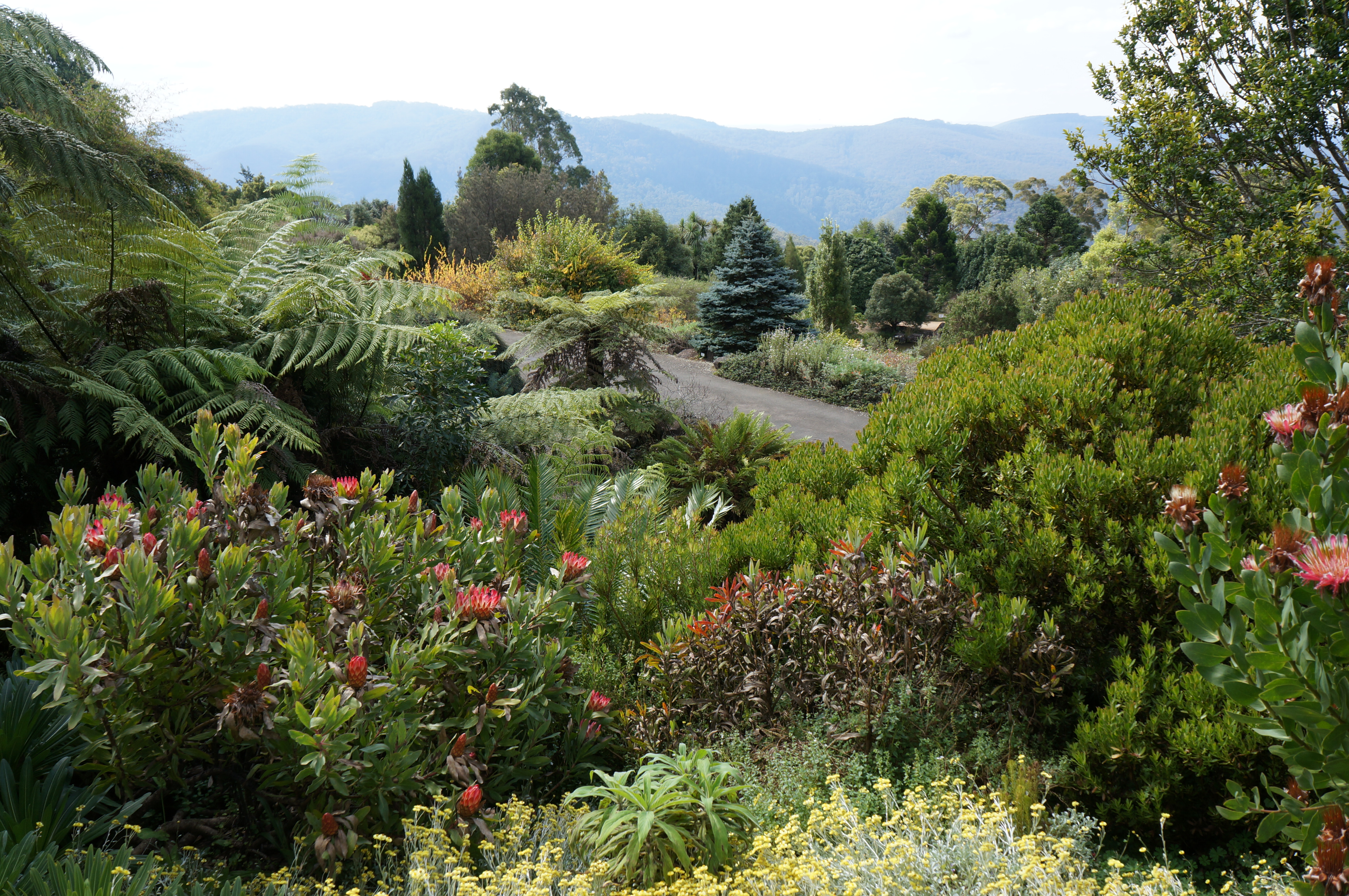
Proteaceae garden, Blue Mountains Botanic Garden

The Garden opened on 1 November 1987. It includes an additional 230 hectares (570 acres) of land dedicated to conservation. The garden is 1,000 metres (3,300 ft) AHD, and it specializes in cool-climate plants that would not grow well in Sydney's warmer conditions. The gardens are managed by the Botanic Gardens Trust trading the Botanic Gardens and Centennial Parklands, that also has responsibility for the Royal Botanic Gardens, Sydney and the Australian Botanic Garden at Mount Annan. The Trust is a division of the Department of Environment and Planning.

== History ==
The land was originally granted to Susannah Bowen, the mother of George M. C. Bowen, in 1830. She had arrived in the colony in 1828.

== See also ==
- Australian Botanic Garden Mount Annan
- Auburn Botanical Gardens
- Macquarie Culvert
- National Herbarium of New South Wales
- Royal Botanic Garden, Sydney
- The Domain, Sydney
