= Mount Irvine, New South Wales =

Village and mountain in New South Wales, Australia

Mount Irvine
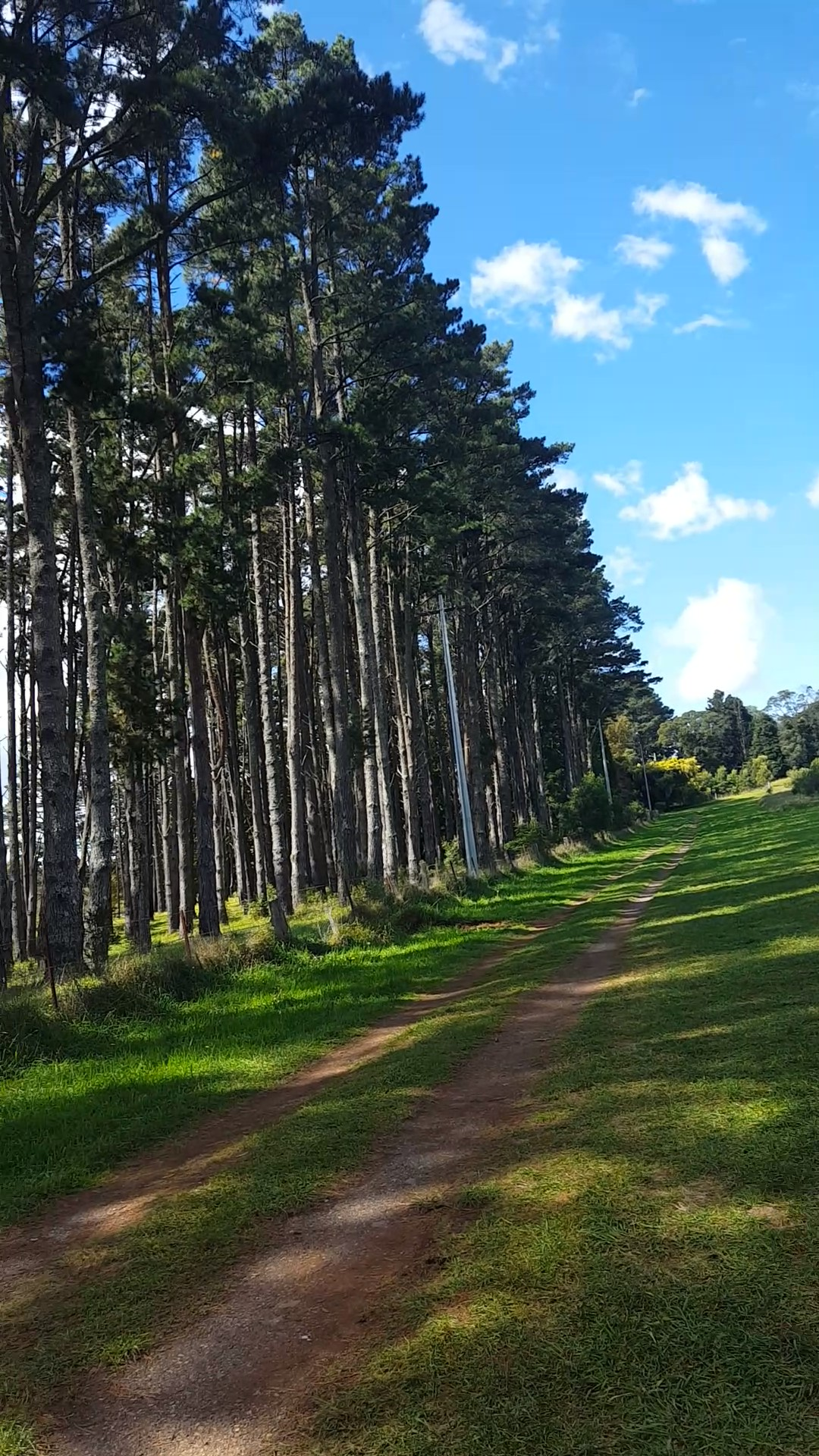
- Nutwood Farm, Mt Irvine

Highest point
- Elevation: 850 m (2,790 ft)
- Coordinates: 33°30′S 150°28′E

Geography
- Location within New South Wales

Mount Irvine is a small village and a mountain located in the Blue Mountains region in the state of New South Wales, Australia. The village is situated in the City of Blue Mountains in Greater Western Sydney. At the 2021 census, Mount Irvine has a population of 22.

At an elevation of 850 metres (2,790 ft) above sea level, the mountain is approximately 85 kilometres (53 mi) west northwest from Sydney CBD and more than two hours by car. The area has a wet micro climate and rich basalt soils, weathered from ancient volcanics. Rainfall is in excess of 1,500 millimetres (59 in) a year and vegetation is predominantly temperate rain forest. The area is typified by some spectacular temperate gardens, similar to those in the neighbouring area of Mount Wilson.

There are only twenty or so properties with a small amount of commercial activity; mainly walnut and chestnut groves. There is no large-scale commercial farming, and organic methods are widely used.

== History ==
Mt Irvine Road was first surveyed in 1897 by government surveyor Charles Scrivener. Later the same year he returned with his son, Charles Passevile Scrivener, who brought two of his fellow graduates from Hawkesbury Agricultural College. The elder Scrivener proposed to designate the area as a national reserve. When this failed and 400 hectares of land was released for sale, Scrivener's son and his two friends bought up the first three grants. Scrivener himself settled in Mt. Irvine upon his retirement in 1915. Their families remain in Mt. Irvine to this day.

== See also ==
- List of mountains in New South Wales
