= Mountain View, Richmond =

Mountain View
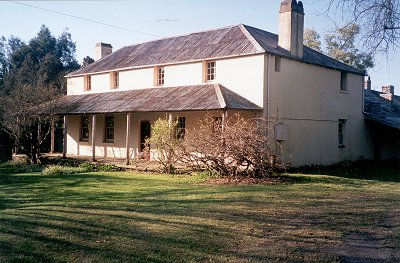

- Location within New South Wales Location within Australia
- 33.5998°S 150.7324°E
- Location: 22 Inalls Lane, Richmond, City of Hawkesbury, New South Wales, Australia

History
- Built: 1804–1870

New South Wales Heritage Register
- Official name: Mountain View; Dight's Farm
- Type: state heritage (complex / group)
- Designated: 2 April 1999
- Reference no.: 44
- Type: Homestead Complex
- Category: Farming and Grazing
- Builders: Lewis Jones, James Vincent

Mountain View is a heritage-listed residence at 22 Inalls Lane, Richmond, City of Hawkesbury, New South Wales, Australia. It was built from 1804 to 1870 by Lewis Jones and James Vincent. It is also known as Dight's Farm. It was added to the New South Wales State Heritage Register on 2 April 1999.

== History ==
=== Indigenous and early colonial occupation ===
The lower Hawkesbury was home to the Dharug people. The proximity to the Nepean River and South Creek qualifies it as a key area for food resources for indigenous groups. The Dharug and Darkinjung people called the river Deerubbin and it was a vital source of food and transport.

Governor Arthur Phillip explored the local area in search of suitable agricultural land in 1789 and discovered and named the Hawkesbury River after Baron Hawkesbury. This region played a significant role in the early development of the colony with European settlers established here by 1794. Situated on fertile floodplains and well known for its abundant agriculture, Green Hills (as it was originally called) supported the colony through desperate times. However, frequent flooding meant that the farmers along the riverbanks were often ruined.

=== Dight's Farm/Mountain View ===
John Dight (1772 - 1837) with his wife Hannah (1781 - 1862) and baby daughter Sarah arrived in the colony on 12 June 1801 as free settlers on board the "Earl Cornwallis". They received a grant on 31 March 1802 of 155 acres from Governor King at Mulgrave Place - later called Richmond - the grant to be known as "Durham Bowes". This grant was on the eastern bank of the Hawkesbury River, downhill and slightly north of the location of the later Dight's Farm/ today's Mountain View. Richard Rouse and his sons (of Rouse Hill House and farm) had various grants on the opposite, western bank of the Hawkesbury River. Surveyor James Meehan laid out the grants in the area.

Various disputes arose among grantees about access to the nearby towns. Settlers fenced off access routes across their grants.

The Hawkesbury River was in flood three times during 1806 causing the destruction of the Dight's four roomed brick dwelling on their lowlands grant. This induced them to purchase 9 acres on the highlands to safely accommodate their growing family. It was on the south-west corner of Edward Luttrell's 1804 grant and became known as Dight's Hill. The farm was advertised to be let in 1808 when John Dight was Superintendent of Carpenters at the Commissariat Store in Parramatta during Richard Rouse's absence from that position.

In 1810, Governor Lachlan Macquarie established the five Macquarie Towns in the Hawkesbury region, including Richmond. The settlement thus became more permanent, with streets, a town square and public buildings.

In March 1812 John Dight contracted with Lewis Jones - who together with carpenter James Vincent were described in the Bigge report of 1820 as "two of the best builders in this part of the colony" to erect a dwelling house of two storeys for the sum of twenty six pounds. This building was next to, but independent of the original dwelling and consisted of one room on each storey. The contract was witnessed by Margaret Catchpole, the esteemed convict nurse.

Governor Macquarie wrote to Earl Bathurst in 1817 and expressed indignation at the obstinacy of the Hawkesbury settlers, continuing to reside on lands subject to flooding. In 1819 Richmond's populace petitioned Macquarie with many disputes over access to the towns (around other grants). Surveyor James Meehan's recommendations were disregarded. William Cox Jnr. of Hobartville fenced off the road to Dight's Farm, meaning that John Dight had to go the long way around his land daily to reach his lowland farm.

John and Hannah Dight's family increased to thirteen children with the birth of their eighth daughter Sophia in November 1823. Two years later Elizabeth their second daughter married Hamilton Hume the explorer, following his return from discovering a route to Port Phillip.

During the 1820s and 1830s the sons of John and Hannah Dight were establishing themselves as pastoral pioneers in areas they had helped discover - Hunter River, Liverpool Plains, Namoi River and Macintyre River, Hume (Murray) River and the Yarra River, where John the younger and his brother Charles built the river's first (water-powered) flour mill at what became known as Dights Falls.

The building remains little-altered from the 1870s when the link section was constructed, the south-west and south-east elevations were stucco-ed and the shingle roof was replaced with corrugated iron.

A 1920s photograph from the Dight family showed the homestead complex in a fairly open grassed landscape with few trees.

In the 1970s an internal brick wall was removed in the original cottage and a brick wall on the north-east elevation was rebuilt. 9 acres of the former highland farm was subdivided, alienating the surviving outbuildings and landscape features. By 1978 the barn, hayshed, coach house, servants' sheds and horse mill were all demolished.

== Description ==
Mountain View is a well sited homestead on Dight's Hill overlooking the Richmond Lowlands and is an integral part of the historic escarpment. The nine acre highland farm was subdivided in the 1970s alienating the surviving outbuildings and landscape features. The barn, hayshed, coach house, servants sheds and horse mill were all demolished by 1978.

=== Homestead ===
The building is an early Colonial Georgian homestead, comprising several elements.

The original two-roomed sandstock brick cottage with mud/shell mortar and plaster has a corrugated iron roof, central chimney and original joinery and dates from c. 1804. The original kitchen with a large fireplace and a bread oven was added pre 1812. This single storey section has brick floors covered by concrete.

The 1812 and 1820s two storey additions are sandstock brick with mud/shell mortar and plaster with a hipped corrugated iron roof and an asymmetrical single-storey verandah with iron roof supported by tapered hardwood octagonal columns over Marulan stone flagging. Internal joinery includes a built -in cupboard (1812), cedar chimney pieces and hardwood flooring with handmade nails survive.

Unusual features include a mock chimney on the west end to achieve Georgian symmetry and nine pane sliding sash windows in the upper storey.

It survives remarkably intact.

=== Garden ===
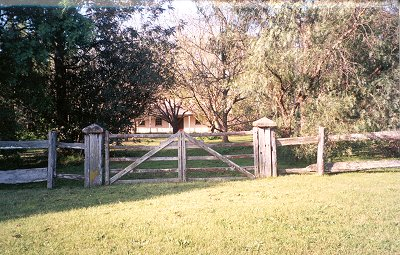
Post and rail fence

A post and rail fence still bounds the front of the property facing Inall's Lane. A low-key driveway leads into the eastern side of the front garden to an open carport beside the main homestead and beside the southern end of the original cottage. A pedestrian path winds from a separate central southern gate to the front door. The front garden is now a semi-woodland planted partly to screen development south of Inalls Lane and adjacent on both sides - with trees including silver elm (Ulmus minor 'Variegata'), various English oaks (Quercus robur), Chinese elm (Ulmus parvifolia), silky oak (Grevillea robusta), pepper(corn) tree (Schinus molle), desert ash (Fraxinus oxycarpa), pin oak (Quercus palustris), crab apple (Malus sp./cv.), crepe myrtles (Lagerstroemia indica), Japanese maple (Acer palmatum), paperbark (Melaleuca sp.) and the scented flowering shrub Viburnum carlesii.

The eastern side of the garden is notable for a number of tall trees providing screening and privacy to the neighbours, including smooth barked/coastal apple/Sydney red gum (Angophora costata), pepper(corn) tree, white cedar (Melia azedarach var.australasica), white barked gums (possibly Eucalyptus rossii/Corymbia citriodora), a London plane (Platanus × hispanica) to the rear, paperbark and an Illawarra plum/brown pine (Podocarpus elatus).

The western side of the garden includes Chinese elm trees, a manna /flowering ash (Fraxinus ornus), Queensland black bean (Castanospermum australe), sugi/Japanese cedar (Cryptomeria japonica), forest oaks (Allocasuarina torulosa), lily pilly (Syzygium australe), silky oaks.

The rear (northern) garden has open areas of grass fringed and spotted with trees, some large and mature, for privacy. A former central hedge running north-south is now overgrown with climbers (Pandorea species and others). Trees include jacaranda (Jacaranda mimosifolia), pepper(corn)s, box elder (Acer negundo), southern nettle (Celtis australis), mulberry (Morus sp.), white cedars, holly (Ilex aquifolium), variegated laurustinus (Viburnum tinus 'Variegata').

=== Modifications and dates ===
- c. 1804 two roomed sandstock brick cottage with mud-/shell mortar and plaster and shingle roof.
- 1812 and 1820s two storey additions in sandstock brick with shingle roof.
- 1812 built-in cupboard, chimney pieces and hardwood flooring all survive
- 1870s: Brick two storey link section between original cottage and 1812 addition. Iron roof replaced shingles.
- 1970s: Removal of internal brick wall in original cottage. Rebuilding of brick wall north east elevation. Concrete verandah along north west elevation. Iron roof over stone flagging south east elevation, kitchen, bathrooms and laundry in link section.
- 1970s the nine acre highland farm was subdivided alienating the surviving outbuildings and landscape features.
- by 1978 the barn, hayshed, coach house, servants sheds and horse mill were all demolished

== Heritage listing ==
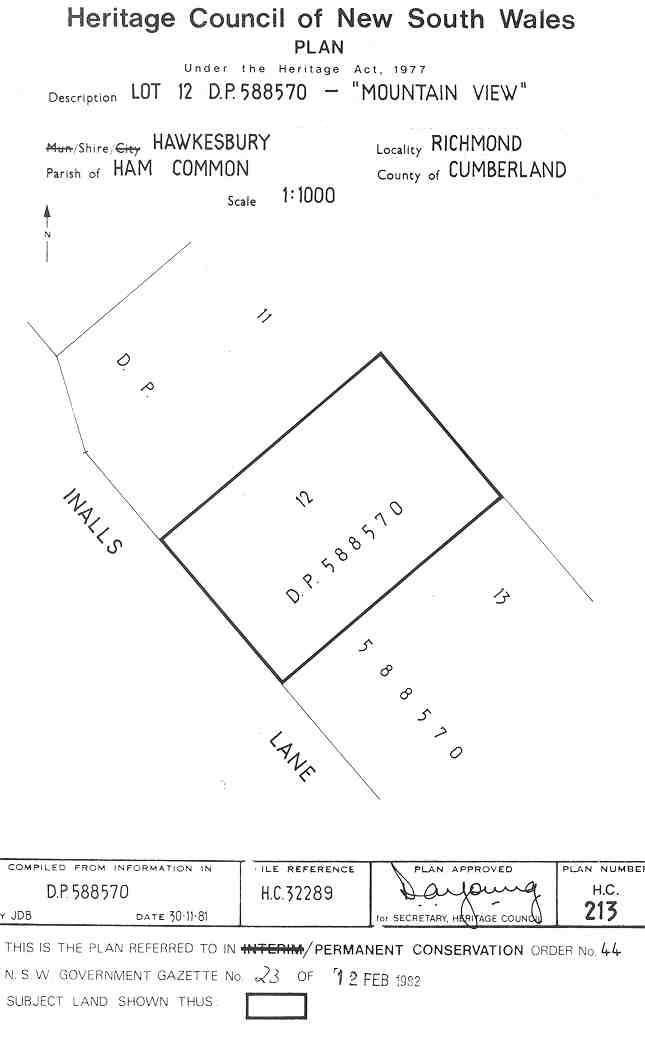
Heritage boundaries

The homestead on Dights Hill is a rare survivor, largely dating from the first quarter century of the colony. It is a substantially intact example of early building materials and techniques. It is a feature of the landscape which provides evidence of having set the example to establish the safe accommodation on the highlands out of reach of the flood waters of the Hawkesbury River. Documentary records and physical evidence support the educational and research potential of Dights Hill and the archaeological resource of an early farm complex. Well documented associations with exploration, pastoralism and prominent historical figures have attracted both local and overseas visitors with an interest in early Australian history to the site. These outstanding factors contribute to the exceptionally high significance of this item of National heritage.

Mountain View was listed on the New South Wales State Heritage Register on 2 April 1999 having satisfied the following criteria.

The place is important in demonstrating the course, or pattern, of cultural or natural history in New South Wales.

The item is historically significant because John Dight was one of the early Colony's most respected free settlers. The establishment of his farm complex on the highlands pre-dated Governor Macquaries edict of 1810 which required the settlers to provide flood free accommodation for themselves and their stock etc.

The place has a strong or special association with a person, or group of persons, of importance of cultural or natural history of New South Wales's history.

The item is significant because of its association with John Dight, one of the colony's most respected free settlers. Dight's example in relocating his homestead to the high ground above the floodplain had a significant influence on later settlement patterns. Dight was a free settler, and for a time, Superintendent of Carpenters at the Commissariat Store in Parramatta during Richard Rouse's absence from that position.

The place is important in demonstrating aesthetic characteristics and/or a high degree of creative or technical achievement in New South Wales.

The item is aesthetically significant because of its harmonious relationship with the landscape. Its setting on the floodbank escarpment overlooking the lowland farms is an integral part of an historic landscape.

The place has strong or special association with a particular community or cultural group in New South Wales for social, cultural or spiritual reasons.

The social significance is demonstrated in the continuing interest of professionals, students and the general public because of the items association with prominent historic figures and the age of the building.

The place has potential to yield information that will contribute to an understanding of the cultural or natural history of New South Wales.

The item is a well documented resource of the building materials and techniques from the beginning of the 19th century together with a well documented social history. The existence of the 1812 building contract between John Dight and Lewis Jones which relates to the intact building is exceptional.

The place possesses uncommon, rare or endangered aspects of the cultural or natural history of New South Wales.

The item is an important survivor from the first quarter of the colony.

The place is important in demonstrating the principal characteristics of a class of cultural or natural places/environments in New South Wales.

The item represents a substantial building with a sequential pattern of growth which can be easily interpreted.
