= The Hawkesbury Crown =

Godolphin Crown registered as Hawkesbury Crown
- Class: Group 3
- Location: Hawkesbury Racecourse, Clarendon, New South Wales, Australia
- Inaugurated: 2010
- Race type: Thoroughbred - flat
- Sponsor: Pioneer Services (2022-2026)

Race information
- Distance: 1,300 metres
- Surface: Turf
- Track: Right-handed
- Qualification: Fillies and mares three years old and older
- Weight: Open handicap
- Purse: A$250,000 (2026)

The Hawkesbury Crown, is a Hawkesbury Racing Club Group 3 Thoroughbred horse race for fillies and mares three years old and older, with set weights with penalties conditions, over a distance of 1300 metres, held at Hawkesbury Racecourse in Clarendon, New South Wales, Australia.

== History ==
=== Grade ===
- 2011–2013 - Listed Race
- 2014 onwards - Group 3

=== Other venues ===
- 2015 - Rosehill Racecourse
- 2020 - Rosehill Racecourse

=== Name ===
- 2011–2015 - The Darley Crown
- 2016–2018 - Godolphin Crown
- 2019 onwards - Hawkesbury Crown

=== Recent multiple winners ===
Trainers

- Peter Snowden in 2011, 2013, 2014 and in partnership with Paul Snowden in 2024
- Chris Waller in 2017, 2020 and 2023.

Jockeys

- Nash Rawiller in 2012, 2021 and 2023

== Winners ==
the following are past winners of the race.

- 2026 - Chidiac
- 2025 - City Of Lights
- 2024 - Coco Jamboo
- 2023 - Princess Grace
- 2022 - Exotic Ruby
- 2021 - Sweet Deal
- 2020 - Sweet Scandal
- 2019 - Irithea
- 2018 - Pecans
- 2017 - Shillelagh
- 2016 - Nancy
- 2015 - ‡Solicit
- 2014 - Aerobatics
- 2013 - Aerobatics
- 2012 - More Strawberries
- 2011 - Kanzan
- 2010 - Serenissima

‡ Race meeting abandoned after the first race on the card due to prolonged rain that affected the state of the track Race held the following week at Rosehill Racecourse.

== See also ==
- Hawkesbury Gold Cup
- Hawkesbury Guineas
- List of Australian Group races
- Group races
