= New Inn (disambiguation) =

New Inn is a village in Torfaen, South Wales.

New Inn or The New Inn may also refer to:

== Settlements ==
- New Inn, Carmarthenshire, Wales
- New Inn, County Galway, Ireland
- New Inn, County Laois, Ireland
- New Inn, County Tipperary, Ireland
- New Inn, Devon, England, a United Kingdom location
- New Inn, Monmouthshire, Wales, a United Kingdom location
- New Inn, Pembrokeshire, Wales

== Other uses ==
- New Inn (Temple), one of the Inns of Chancery, London, England
- New Inn, Richmond, a historic building in the City of Hawkesbury, New South Wales, Australia
- New Inn Hall, Oxford, a medieval building of the University of Oxford, England
- The New Inn, Gloucester, a historic building in Gloucester, England
- The New Inn, Ham Common, a historic building in the London Borough of Richmond upon Thames, England
- New Inn, Cononley, a historic pub in North Yorkshire, England
- New Inn, Easingwold, a former coaching inn in North Yorkshire, England
- The New Inn, a 1629 play by Ben Jonson
