= Hawkesbury Gold Cup =

- Class: Group 3
- Location: Hawkesbury Racecourse, Clarendon, New South Wales, Australia
- Inaugurated: 1980
- Race type: Thoroughbred - flat
- Sponsor: Richmond Club (2022 - 2026)

Race information
- Distance: 1,600 metres
- Surface: Turf
- Track: Right-handed
- Weight: Open Handicap
- Purse: A$250,000 (2026)

The Hawkesbury Gold Cup is a Hawkesbury Racing Club Group 3 Thoroughbred open handicap horse race over a distance of 1600 metres, held at Hawkesbury Racecourse in Clarendon, New South Wales, Australia.

== History ==
Originally this race was held in December and was moved to November in 2008. The race was once again moved in 2013 to August and in 2014 to May.

=== Distance ===
- 1980–1988 – 2000 metres
- 1989 onwards - 1600 metres
- 2020 was 1500 metres

=== Grade ===
- 1980–1997 - Listed Race
- 1997 onwards - Group 3

=== Other venues ===
- 2020 - Rosehill Racecourse

=== Recent multiple winners ===
Trainers

- Gai Waterhouse in 2004, 2006, 2007 and with Adrian Bott in 2017
- Michael, John & Wayne Hawkes in 2014, 2018, 2020 and 2021.

Jockeys

- Chris Munce in 2004, 2007 and 2010
- James McDonald in 2014 and 2023
- Nash Rawiller in 2024 and 2025.

== Winners ==
The following are past winners of the race.

- 2026 - Churchill's Choice
- 2025 - Punch Lane
- 2024 - Just Folk
- 2023 - New Mandate
- 2022 - Kirwan's Lane
- 2021 - Archedemus
- 2020 - Amangiri
- 2019 - Archedemus
- 2018 - Kingsguard
- 2017 - Fabrizio
- 2016 - Amovatio
- 2015^{(1)} - Sons of John
- 2014 - Leebaz
- 2013 - Coup Ay Tee
- 2012 - Darci Be Good
- 2011 - Somepin Anypin
- 2010 - Thankgodyou'rehere
- 2009 - Keepin' The Dream
- 2008 - Nuclear Sky
- 2007 - race not held^{(2)}
- 2006 - Beauty Watch
- 2005 - Wild Queen
- 2004 - Court's In Session
- 2003 - Stoway
- 2002 - This Manshood
- 2001 - Carael Boy
- 2000 - Huge Demand
- 1999 - Huge Demand
- 1998 - Referral
- 1997 - Quick Flick
- 1996 - Magic Road
- 1995 - Magic Road
- 1994 - Jack Attack
- 1993 - Thrifty Reserve
- 1992 - Mr Impose
- 1991 - Shining Wind
- 1990 - Rancho Classic
- 1989 - Swain
- 1988 - Regal Native
- 1987 - My Parade
- 1986 - Gold Zama
- 1985 - Peaceful Joe
- 1984 - Kutzbah
- 1983 - Almond Valley
- 1982 - Knight's Affair
- 1981 - King's Ideal
- 1980 - Peninsula
- ^(1) Race meeting scheduled for 2 May 2015 was abandoned after the first race on the card due to prolonged rain that affected the condition of the track. The event was rescheduled for later and held on 7 June 2015.
- ^(2) Not held because of outbreak of equine influenza

== See also ==
- Hawkesbury Crown
- Hawkesbury Guineas
- List of Australian Group races
- Group races
