= Richmond Park (New South Wales) =

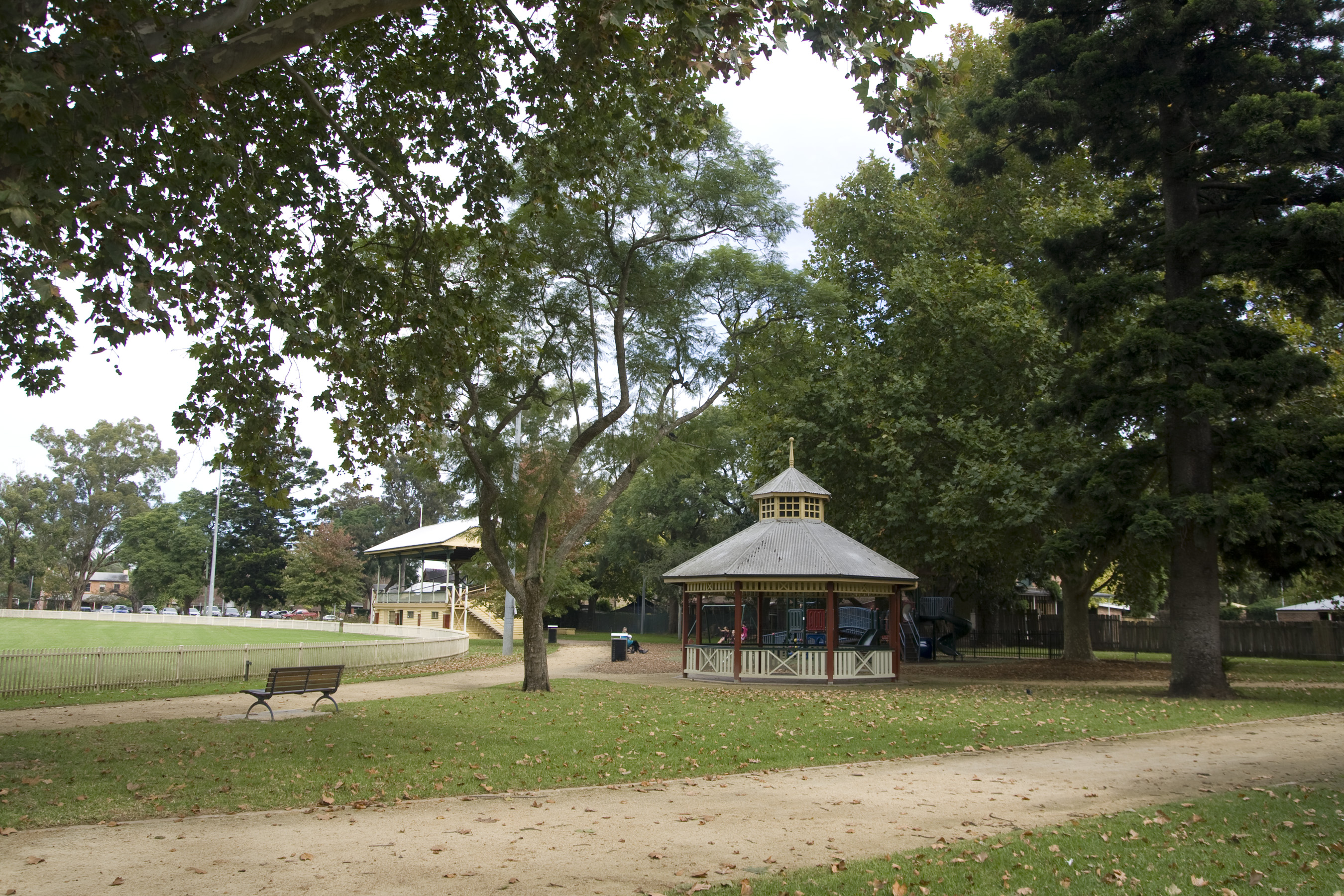

- Location within New South Wales Location within Australia
- 33.5980°S 150.7515°E
- Location: Bounded by East Market, Windsor and March Streets, Richmond, City of Hawkesbury, New South Wales, Australia

Site notes
- Architect(s): Lachlan Macquarie and James Meehan (park); George Matcham Pitt jnr. (pavilion)
- Owner: Hawkesbury City Council

New South Wales Heritage Register
- Official name: Richmond Park; Market Place; Square
- Type: state heritage (landscape)
- Designated: 5 March 2010
- Reference no.: 1808
- Type: Urban Park
- Category: Parks, Gardens and Trees
- Builders: Samuel Boughton (Pavilion)

Richmond Park is a heritage-listed public park and sporting venue bounded by East Market, Windsor and March Streets, Richmond, City of Hawkesbury, New South Wales, Australia. It was proclaimed by Governor Lachlan Macquarie in 1810 and surveyed by James Meehan in 1811. The historic pavilion was designed by George Matcham Pitt Jr. in 1882 and built by Samuel Boughton in 1883–84. The park is owned by Hawkesbury City Council. It was added to the New South Wales State Heritage Register on 5 March 2010.

== History ==
Before any European colonisation of the Richmond area, the Hawkesbury region was once inhabited by the Dharug people. The riparian area along the Hawkesbury River had been a food source for the local Aboriginal people for over 50,000 years and, with relatively frequent floods that spread enriched alluvium throughout the surrounding land, the region was known to be an abundant and reliable resource for food.

Following European colonisation, the new colonists quickly recognised the agricultural potential of the banks of the Hawkesbury River. This led to intensive farming of the area to supply food to the developing colony that was experiencing severe shortages in the early years. However, following flooding in 1799, 1800, 1806 and 1809, life for the colonists farming the flats of the Hawkesbury River was a hard one, fraught with potential devastation with any inundation of the river

As one of the first tasks following his appointment as the Governor of New South Wales in 1810, Lachlan Macquarie was instructed by the British Government to survey and select five flood-free sites along the Hawkesbury River to determine which were best suited for new townships. To protect the future prosperity of the colony, the development of the selected towns was intended to expand food production and promote progress, self-sufficiency and sustainability amongst the settlers. Macquarie had intended to encourage the farming communities, established in the high-risk flood plains, to relocate and settle in the new townships, thus providing refuge and security for the farmers themselves as well as their livestock and crops.

The five towns, personally and specifically selected by Governor Macquarie, were to become Windsor, Richmond, Castlereagh, Pitt Town and Wilberforce. Of these new sites, Richmond was the first to be chosen by Macquarie, officially defined in December 1810 and laid out by the Government Surveyor, James Meehan, on 10 January 1811. Originally, ten acres (four hectares) of land in the centre of the town was reserved by Macquarie as the location of "the great square", now Richmond Park. Located between two principal thoroughfares running from east to west, the position of this open space was conceived as a central marketplace for the new town and as a suitable site for the activities of the local community.

Originally established when the town pattern was laid out in 1811, the size of the "Market Place" was reduced to its present size (3.2 hectares) after 1821 when the western strip of land, boarded by West Market Street, was reallocated for purposes of law and order. In 1811 the Government surveyor, James Meehan, established the grid pattern of streets including the "Market Square", bounded by Windsor and March Streets, East Market and West Market Streets. The reserved open space was reduced after 1821 to an area of 7 acres 3 roods 37 perches (i.e. the present area of 3.23 ha). The remaining portion of Crown reserve, between the "square" and West Market Street, was set aside for other purposes including building a watch house and later the Court House, post office, Masonic Lodge, School of Arts and public school. Although the "square" may have been used initially as a marketplace, as shown on the 1827 plan of Richmond, it appears that this parcel of public open space had become a popular venue for cricket and football (possibly rugby union), were played in latter years, cricket has remained the major sporting activity for over 160 years.

Despite the reduction in size, the marketplace, at least in the 1820s and 1830s, was used for buying and selling stock and crops. In the 1840s however, the land was largely cleared of vegetation and the site underwent a change in use from a marketplace to an area for more active recreational purposes, particularly for athletics ('foot races') and cricket.

By the 1840s almost all of the square's native vegetation of River Flat Eucalypt Forest (Alluvial Woodland) had been cleared with only a few original trees standing. The clearing of vegetation resulted in the ground becoming uneven and boggy after rain, strewn with fallen logs, tree stumps and noxious weeds. Up until the park was fenced in 1864, cattle and horses (a common feature of the Richmond streetscape) would graze untethered and without approval, leading to further degradation of the park grounds. The few remaining (original) trees disappeared over the years as successive improvements and overlays of planting of generic native and exotic trees, shrubs and borders were introduced. The aging River oaks (Casuarina cunninghamiana), swamp mahoganies (Eucalyptus robusta) and river red gums (Eucalyptus camaldulensis) have all been introduced during later park embellishments. None of the original native vegetation survives today.

Although the poor condition of the park was not an immediate issue for Richmond, in 1864 the town became more closely linked to Sydney with the construction of the Richmond railway line. With this line, came prosperity and an increasing public interest in developing and improving the town. Made up of local community members, the Improvement Committee was established around this time to focus on enhancing the appearance of the square and the facilities available to the public. With the help of the local community, this involved levelling the degraded parkland, laying turf to improve the quality of the cricket pitch, planting both native and exotic species of trees ('river oak, myall and red cedar and exotics English oak, conifers, beech (Fagus sp.), poplar, cork (Quercus suber) and Judas (Cercis siliquastrum) trees') and installing wooden seats for the comfort of the park users.

With the renewed community effort to improve this area of public open space, the status of the square was changing and, in 1868, the site was officially gazetted for public recreation. It was also around this same time that the site became first known as Richmond Park.

In 1872 Richmond became a borough and in 1873 the newly elected Richmond Municipal Council was appointed as trustee of the park by the Department of Lands. This provided the catalyst for a new phase of coordinated development.

In its newly improved state and with the official change in status, a board of trustees made up of local community members was appointed to take responsibility for the ongoing maintenance of the Park. The local trustees were William Bowman (a local politician and grazier), Stephen Field (property owner) and Edward Powell (a farmer and justice of the peace). In an effort to further develop the park's design and collection of plantations, the trustees wrote in 1870 to Charles Moore, the Director of the Sydney Botanic Gardens, to request suitable trees (both exotics and Australian sub-tropical rainforest species) for planting around the boundary. A similar request to the Botanic Gardens was made again in 1873, this time from the Municipal Council who took over vested interest in the park from the local trustees in 1873, on behalf of the Crown

The plants supplied by the Sydney Botanic Gardens, as well as Australian natives, included a mix of species commonly found in public places of Britain and Europe (including exotics such as poplars (Populus spp., planes (Platanus sp.), mixed conifers (Pinus and Cupressus spp.) and Australian sub-tropical rainforest species such as hoop pine (Araucaria cunninghamii), bunya pine (Araucaria bidwillii), red cedar (Toona ciliata), white cedar (Melia azedarach var. australasica), silky oak (Grevillea robusta), swamp mahogany and brush box (Lophostemon confertus). The African olive (Olea europaea ssp. cuspidata) on the Windsor Street frontage is believed to be one of the earliest plantings in the park. Other early introductions included the informal row of river oaks, a local native species (Casuarina cunninghamiana) along the western boundary. These were intermixed with local rainforest species (Araucaria, Toona and Melia spp.) and other introduced evergreen and deciduous ornamentals such as the Cape chestnut (Calodendrum capense) and hackberry/nettle tree (Celtis occidentalis). Swamp mahogany specimens remain on two sides of the park. Many of these trees continue to define the park's historic landscape character and visual integrity.

An 1879 photograph clearly shows fenced plantations (the outer perimeter fence (i.e. painted hardwood post and double rail) was installed during this period and the boundary plantation was protected with a second double rail fence) around the park within the foreground trees from 2–6 m tall including hoop pines, silky oaks, Lombardy poplars (Populus nigra "Italica", big cone pine (Pinus coulteri), Mediterranean cypresses (Cupressus sempervirens) and other species. The large mature trees (some of which remain from at least the 1870s) include tall, dominant include four hoop pines (two on the western edge, two in the north-eastern corner), river oaks (two large trees on the western edge), a deliberate specimen planting of river red gums (Eucalyptus camaldulensis) (several in the south-western corner), Canary Island pine (Pinus canariensis) in the north-eastern corner, a red cedar (Toona ciliata) and silky oaks (Grevillea robusta).

The inner park plantations were typically defined by an eclectic mix of botanical specimens. The park's boundary plantations of emergent hoop and bunya pines with their dark, glossy foliage, distinctive symmetrical forms, towering dimensions and massive scale, were used for dramatic impact. 13 bunya pines were planted possibly as early as the 1860s, but were later removed in 1946 due to the potential danger to the public from massive cones falling from their tops. The hoop pines were retained.

Most of Sydney's 19th-century parks reflect this layout and palette pioneered by Charles Moore (director of the Botanic Gardens, Sydney 1848–96) and that of Joseph Henry Maiden, Moore's successor as director of the Botanic Gardens, Sydney (1896–1924). Their influence had a profound impact on Sydney's public parks and gardens. They provided Sydney with a lasting legacy of great 19th- and early 20th-century landscapes including the Botanic Gardens, Domain, Moore Park and Centennial Parklands.

Creation of public parks in a common design was a global practice in the late nineteenth century and one that intended to provide an enjoyable pleasant environment for the community as well as, in Australia, reflect the picturesque and idealized landscape of Europe. During this period, the Park's collection of plantations grew increasingly complex and eclectic. Nursery suppliers and local people contributed to the collection - although some species added were not suited to the environment and ultimately failed, many flourished. By 1883, more than 143 trees were recorded in Richmond Park.

The provision of these types of parks also had a scientific role in the community as arboretums. Diverse collections of plantations, many individually identified with plaques on trees bearing botanical and common names, was typical of early municipal parks. Some plaques remain today and these indicate that the educational purpose of Richmond Park continued well into the twentieth century (inter-war and post-war periods).

To beautify the [ark, the 1880s saw a more elaborate design layout implemented by the Council. Three distinct areas of the Park were created - the "Outer Park" including the border plantations; the "Inner Park" including designed flower beds, shrubs and public seating that were interconnected by encircling pathways; and the "Central Area" with the large grassed oval that was increasingly being used for organised sporting activities. The "inner park" of 1879 consisted of exotic shrubs and border planting. This early garden layout is typical of the Gardenesque Style (c. 1835–1890) which reflected the classical, formal influences of the Victorian, Georgian, Regency, Classical and Italianate architectural styles of the period. The park's design featured an elaborate layout of fenced triangular planting beds which were interconnected by a rigid geometric pattern of formal gravel pathways. The "inner park" gardens lay between the cricket oval (open space) and the outer perimeter tree plantation creating, for the first time, a multi-layered effect. In 1882 the park's oval boundary was formalised with a painted post and single-top Arris rail fence. Both the oval and outer boundary fences were later replaced with a timber post, tubular steel top rail and wire-mesh fence. This structural layout of the park established three separate and inter-related components - a defined central sporting space (cricket ground), surrounded by perimeter pathways and gardens and an outer wooded park boundary. Seating and public amenities were added and the park gained broad recognition for its quality. It was featured in the 1886 County of Cumberland Year Book.

Further embellishment saw the incorporation of built elements. In 1882, the lack of any permanent buildings was recognised and it was decided that a pavilion, overlooking the sports field, should be constructed to add necessary distinction and amenity. The design was opened to a general competition that invited architects to design a structure that would seat about 300 people but cost no more than £300. It was also to be built of timber on brick piers, have a small room for the use of athletes and cricketers and be facing east across the oval. The competition generated much interest and, in March 1882, the entry named "Energy", designed by George Matcham Pitt junior was selected despite its cost, estimated to be 360 pounds. To build it there was only one tender. Samuel Boughton, a popular member of the local community, was given the job and, despite the "Erected 1883" inscription on one of the stone piers, construction was completed in early 1884.

This pavilion has remained a dominant built feature since the 1880s and, although severely damaged by fire in 1980 and restored by 1994, it continues to bring a historic nineteenth-century resonance to the Park (.

During the period that the pavilion was being constructed, work was also undertaken on improving the cricket ground. In 1882, at a price of over £120, the ground and pavilion were enclosed with a fence and a concrete wicket was laid on the oval. The request for these improvement works had come from the Richmond Cricket Club and, with the support of Mayor Holborow (a strong cricket supporter himself), the park was becoming an increasingly popular place for local and visiting teams (including a touring English team in 1887) to play cricket (

The park was also used, although to a much smaller extent, as a football ground. An application to install goal posts (presumably for rugby union) was received by Council in 1882, but approval was only granted with careful supervision to ensure the cricket oval was not affected. However, after being recognised as a safety concern for the football players, it was decided that the concrete pitch would be turfed in winter and exposed in spring and summer. Despite its use as a football ground, cricket has been the most popular sport played in the park throughout its history and the long-term community support for the sport is reflected in its continued dominance today.

In 1892, with the opening of the Richmond Waterworks by the invited Governor Lord Jersey and his wife, Council decided to install a water fountain to commemorate the event. Initial plans indicate the fountain was to be placed in front of the pavilion but, in the days leading up to the event, the position was changed to the Windsor Street frontage. At a cost of 30 pounds, the modest but handsome statue was designed with three iron statues of a winged cherub with a mermaid's tail, anchored on a stone base plinth. Although the fountain remains today, the cherub statues have been stolen but bolt holes do indicate where they were once positioned on the fountain. The fountain also, for a significant period of time, has been dry and inactive, now surrounded by a garden bed. The fountain was a three-tiered iron fountain, which may well have been manufactured by Coalbrookdale and imported from England (grant application, 2011).

Successive phases of park upgrades and embellishment, including tree planting were implemented throughout the early 20th century, albeit interrupted by two world wars and a depression. A large proportion of the park's trees (particularly along the eastern and southern boundaries) were introduced during the inter-war period (c.1915-40) and post-war period (c. 1940s–60s). Many of the park's evergreen and deciduous exotics such as camphor laurel (Cinnamomum camphora), jacarandas (Jacaranda mimosifolia), English oaks (Quercus robur), elms (Ulmus spp.), plane trees (Platanus spp.), hackberry/nettle trees (Celtis sp.), poplars, cypress (Cupressus sp.), California fan palms (Washingtonia robusta), 2 Canary Island date palms (Phoenix canariensis) were planted during these two eras. They remain important visual and structural elements. The park's elms (Ulmus × hollandica) are believed to be a hybrid (Ulmus glabra x Ulmus minor) rather than a mix of Ulmus procera (English), Ulmus carpinifolia and Ulmus glabra (Scotch or wych). The massive big cone pine (Pinus coulteri) is an uncommon exotic planting in Sydney and likely dates from this latter phase of planting.

Other mature trees include Chinese elms (Ulmus parvifolia), pin oaks (Quercus palustris), Photinia glabra, blue Atlas cedar (Cedrus atlantica 'Glauca'), brush box, Brazilian pepper trees (Schinus molle var.areira) and kurrajong (Brachychiton populneum).

The inter-war period ushered in a period of significant change for Richmond Park with construction of the Richmond–Kurrajong railway line extension in 1924. A line from Richmond to Kurrajong (a significant producer of citrus, vegetables and firewood), was considered desirable for the town and given approval. Despite not being economically viable, with earnings not expected to cover the costs of running and maintaining the line, construction did proceed. The chosen route ran along March Street and cut across (and required excision of) the south-east corner of the Park, which resulted in the loss of landscape and a number of mature trees. There was a significant public outcry about placement of the line and its likely impact on the Park but, despite public meetings and lobbying, the trees were felled and the line was opened in 1924.

The rail line typically carried one goods train, one passenger train and one mixed goods and passenger train each weekday. Although running at a loss for many years, in 1952, a flood near the North Richmond Bridge caused enough damage to the line to warrant a call to end all services. The Commissioner of Railways could not justify the cost to repair the damage and so the rails were removed and Richmond Park was restored to its original size and shape. Around the new plantings in this area of the Park, signage and a curvaceous brick pathway, although not accurately reflective of the former positioning of the rails, was installed in the c. 1990s to interpret this period of the Park's history. The work was done by Windsor Municipal Council, Richmond Council having amalgamated with it in 1948.

In the 1950s there was a proposal for shops to be built on park land facing Windsor Street. This did not happen, but the park did fall into disrepair at this time, according to Geyer.

A war memorial, a common feature of Australian parks, has also been a part of the site, on the East Market Street frontage, since the early twentieth century. This monument now commemorates not only the two world wars, but also the efforts of the local soldiers in Vietnam and the early twenty-first century' "International Campaign Against Terror". The memorial was once fenced but, with the discovery and excavation of two 1855 cannons buried near the pavilion, the fencing was removed and the canons installed, flanking the monument. It appears that, after significant degradation, they were buried in the Inter-war period but, following their rediscovery in 1985, were unearthed and restored by the No. 2 Aircraft Depot at RAAF Base Richmond before being returned to Council in 1988. There was some debate about whether Council should donate the cannons to the RAAF or the Powerhouse Museum but it was decided to install the cannons alongside the memorial. About 1992 a mature Californian fan palm (Washingtonia robusta) was transplanted to the northern side of the war memorial. It was one of a row which began in the park (with no. 70) and continued along the side of the railway. When the line was electrified, State Rail paid to relocate the palm to the war memorial site. The new palm (no.69) at about 30m tall, is almost half as tall again as its companion. The children's playground was replaced and upgraded with new structures and soft fall areas. A sinuous brick pathway was built in 1988 to represent the railway extension in the park's south-east.

In 1977 the Crown reserve was revoked and ownership of the park was invested with Windsor Municipal Council. In 1980 Council merged with Colo Shire Council to become Hawkesbury Shire Council (and Hawkesbury City Council in 1989). The park experienced considerable development throughout the last two decades of the 20th century. Many of these additions, however, have been somewhat unsympathetic towards the park's heritage values. As a result of increasing public concern and pressure, an interim conservation order was placed on the park by the Heritage Council in 1985. This lapsed in 1987 during a time of intense pressure to create job opportunities and projects during the lead-up to the Bicentennial celebrations in 1988. A number of capital works projects were subsequently initiated. For the Bicentenary some re-landscaping of the war memorial and south-eastern corners was done. A consultant, Jim Hutchinson, now Manager of City Parks for Sydney City Council, redesigned the war memorial area, removing a wire fence and shrub or annual beds and recommending planting of plane trees along East Market Street. Six specimens of planes (Platanus x hybrida) were planted at four-meter intervals.

Further development occurred in the Park around the late twentieth and the early years of the twenty-first century. The pavilion (which had been damaged by fire in 1980) was restored in 1993–94. Public amenities and a maintenance/storage building were built in "Federation style" near the pavilion. A similar style of rotunda was added to the north-west corner of the Park in 2002, across an early pathway alignment. Flower beds and additional seating were introduced. A public artwork initiative was partially implemented.

Although Richmond Park has undergone consistent change over the two centuries since Governor Macquarie designated the area as open space for the community, the site continues to be a distinguishing element in the townscape and one that is an important asset to the community. The focus and layout may have changed but the popularity and value of Richmond Park remains.

=== Comparisons with similar parks ===
In 1810, when Lachlan Macquarie was appointed as Governor of NSW, he personally selected five sites along the Hawkesbury River on which new townships were developed. At this time, the town planning instigated by Macquarie often included a designated central park that was open space to be used by the community.

Of these five townships, three did contain reserved open public space. Along with Richmond, there are also parks in both Windsor and Wilberforce.

In Windsor, the McQuade Park has been a public reserve used for recreation and activities for some 200 years. The Park is a significant asset to the local community who continue to use the site for recreation, celebrations, events and commemoration. The site also contains a war memorial and sporting oval (not unlike Richmond Park).

The Wilberforce Park is another example of Macquarie's town planning. The site, like the others, is in a central location that provides an open space for the community in an urban environment. This park also has a war memorial and is used by the community for recreation and commemoration. The Wilberforce Park, however, is unique in that it remains the same size today that was originally designated by Governor Macquarie in 1810.

Although not one of the five personally selected towns along the Hawkesbury River, Bigge Park in Liverpool was also public open space defined by Macquarie in 1810 and surveyed by James Meehan (the same surveyor for Richmond Park).

The provision of public open space was a recurring feature in the town planning of Governor Macquarie and these parks, along with Richmond Park, are rare examples surviving in NSW today.

== Description ==
Richmond Park sits on 3.2 hectares in a central location in the town, bounded by Windsor, March and East Market Streets. On the western boundary, the Park is neighboured by the Richmond School of Arts, the RSL, an apartment block, Neighbourhood Centre, Early Childhood Centre/Country Women's Association, Court House and former Richmond Post Office.

The soil of the park is unusual for Western Sydney, being basaltic in origin. It is rich and deep and, the water table being fairly close to the surface, lack of moisture is usually not a problem. It is probably due to this soil that a number of English and European species have flourished in the park, although the climate of Richmond is more extreme than is ideal for these species, being drier than coastal Sydney, with more extreme temperatures, frosts and temperatures over 38 degrees each year.

The open green space of the Park is an important element in the townscape and it is one that, although modified over the past two centuries, continues to be a valued space in the Richmond community.

As a designed landscape, Richmond Park is clearly discernable into three separate but inter-related areas:

- "Outer Park" - border tree plantations
- "Inner Park" - shrubs, flower beds, public seating and pathways
- "Central area" - grassed oval for sporting activities

The design of the Park intended to create an attractive public open space that would suit passive recreation and the needs of the community, as well as coexist harmoniously with the increasing use of the space for sporting activities.

This intended design, although modified, is still extant today. The vegetation has changed, it is no longer native, but the presence of large mature trees in the "Outer Park" still reflect the original intention of using border plantations to frame the Park within the townscape.

The aging River oaks (Casuarina cunninghamiana), swamp mahoganies (Eucalyptus robusta) and river red gums (E.camaldulensis) have all been introduced during later park embellishments. None of the original native vegetation survives today.

The inner park plantations were typically defined by an eclectic mix of botanical specimens. The park's boundary plantations of emergent hoop and bunya pines with their dark, glossy foliage, distinctive symmetrical forms, towering dimensions and massive scale, were used for dramatic impact. 13 bunya pines were planted possibly as early as the 1860s, but were later removed in 1946 due to the potential danger to the public from massive cones falling from their tops. The hoop pines were retained.

In the north-western corner is a playground, dominated by a massive plane tree whose seasonal sun and shade are much appreciated. The northeastern corner is shady, especially in summer when planes and elms are in full foliage, and provides alternative seating. This corner has a skyline dominated by the hoop pines and the slash pine (no.29).

Other tree species in the park include white cedar (Melia azederach var.australasica), Cape chestnut (Calodendron capense), Queensland pittosporum (P.rhombifolium), crepe myrtle (Lagerstroemia indica), manna gum (Eucalyptus nichollii), sweet pittosporum (P.undulatum), African olive (Olea europaea var.africana), silky oak (Grevillea robusta), Mediterranean cypress/pencil pine (Cupressus sempervirens), trident maple (Acer buegerianum), strawberry tree (Arbutus unedo), Wheatley elm (Ulmus carpinifolia), Scotch elm (U.glabra), brown pine or Illawarra plum (Podocarpus elatus), camphor laurel (Cinnamomum camphora), Himalayan cedar (Cedrus deodara), sweet gum (Liquidambar styraciflua cv.), Bhutan cypress (Cupressus torulosa)), rough barked cypress (C.glabra), juniper (Juniperus communis 'Stricta'), peach (Prunus persica cv.), red cherry plum (Prunus cerasifera 'Nigra'), tallow wood (Eucalyptus microcorys), white poplar (Populus alba) and coral tree (Erythrina indica).

Shrub species in the park include flowering/Japanese quince (Chaenoemeles speciosa cv.), apple blossom (Abelia x grandiflora), rose of Sharon (Hibiscus rosa-syriacus cv.), may bush (Spiraea cantonensis 'Lanceata'), Camellia japonica as a feature of a small shrub bed (no. 132) along with more flowering quince (2) (133).

By having fewer trees in the "Inner Park", the design also prevents limitations to the views across the open space.

Within the "Inner Park", the layout includes garden beds, public seating, pathways and some built structures that provide for the community's use of the Park.

=== Built structures ===
A rotunda in a "Federation style" resembling the nineteenth-century pavilion, was installed in the north-west corner in 2002. This adjoins a modern children's playground.

On the Windsor Street frontage, a modest iron fountain, although not in its original form, remains extant. The original fountain, installed in 1892, was designed with three statues of a winged cherub with a mermaid's tail on a stone base plinth. The fountain remains extant today but these statues are no longer part of the structure. A sign on the base explains what the fountain once looked like as well as outlining that the cherub statues had been stolen. There are visible bolt holes though, that do indicate where the statues were once positioned on the fountain. Today, this fountain is dry and has not contained water for many years. A flower bed, encircling the fountain, has since been installed.

Along this northern boundary, there is also a small plinth with a sundial. A mounted plaque states "In appreciation of 49 years of continuous service to the Hawkesbury community by Rozzoli Family Jewellers, 1946–1995. Erected by: Richmond Chamber of Commerce".

At the corner of Windsor and East Market Streets, a large "RICHMOND" sign has also been installed in the Park. There is a plaque on this sign stating that it is in memory of Samuel Boughton, a popular local personality and builder of the Park's 1884 Pavilion.

Along the East Market Street frontage, is a war memorial in the form of an obelisk commemorating the war efforts of the local soldiers. Around the main World War I monument, are four smaller pillars, commemorating the effort and losses in World War II, Vietnam and the "International Campaign Against Terror". Following excavation and restoration, two 1855 canons (discovered at the site in 1985) have been installed. These canons now flank the war memorial.

At the south-east corner of the Park, a brick pathway and interpretative signage was installed (in 1988) to highlight the former presence of the Richmond to Kurrajong railway line across this section of the Park. This curvaceous pathway, although intended to represent the rail line (removed in 1952), is largely inaccurate and misrepresentative of this episode in the Park's history.

As a landscape, Richmond Park is dominated by the grassed cricket oval in the centre. Physically, this oval is a major component in the Park and it is where the organised sporting activities, particularly cricket, have been played throughout the Park's history.

Since the late nineteenth century, the oval has been fenced and overlooked by the pavilion, the dominant built structure in the Park. As originally intended, the attractive timber and iron structure provides an amenity as well as bringing historical character to the Park. The current Pavilion was severely damaged by fire in 1980 but was comprehensively restored by 1994. This restoration was not entirely faithful to the detailing of the original building but the Pavilion that stands today does continue to display the historical character of the site, as well as being a focal point in Richmond Park.

Since 1999, the Pavilion or grandstand has been named Rod McConville Stand. A plaque mounted on one of the brick piers explains that the naming was in memory of Rod McConville "for his outstanding service to the local community to sport especially cricket".

Another plaque, on the second brick pier, notes the conservation works undertaken to restore the Pavilion in the early 1990s, following the 1980 fire.

=== Condition ===
Richmond Park is home to extant plantations, which contribute to the amenity of the Park and coexist with the built structures and sports field.

The built features, namely the pavilion, rotunda, war memorial and fountain, are also in good condition.

After a fire in 1980, the pavilion was comprehensively restored to reflect the original design.

The rotunda, built in 2002, was also built to reflect the historic style of the neighbouring Pavilion.

The fountain, although in reasonable condition, is missing the three cherub statues (having been apparently stolen).

The war memorial is in good condition.

Some of the mature native pines (Araucaria species) are showing dieback at their tops and outer branches, which may be due to ground compaction, dryness or air pollution.

Although the current plantations may not be original and the layout may have been altered from the historic design, Richmond Park retains its integrity.

Essentially, Governor Macquarie's intention for a public open space in a central location remains extant. The three distinct sections, the "Outer Park" (border plantations), "Inner Park" (flower beds and pathways) and Central area (grassed sporting oval), remain clear as well. The pavilion, even though not in its original state having been comprehensively restored following a fire in 1980, retains and contributes a historic resonance to Richmond Park.

Being a nineteenth-century park, there has been some modern development that has intruded on the integrity of the site. The construction of the rotunda (built in 2002 but in a similar style to the 1884 pavilion), the playground and the small car park in the south-west corner are also fairly intrusive. However, the modern constructions do reflect the continuity of use of Richmond Park and its continued popularity and use by the community.

Even though the different elements of the Park have undergone various changes, when viewed together they do reflect the original design of the landscape, thus contributing to the integrity of Richmond Park.

=== Modifications and dates ===
As a landscape, Richmond Park has undergone various changes over its 200-year history. From early documentation and photographs, it would appear the landscape design and plantations have changed somewhat but, as a cohesive environment, the Park retains its value within the Richmond townscape.

Plantings over time in the "Outer" park have evolved. An 1879 photograph clearly shows fenced plantations around the park within the foreground trees from 2-6m tall including hoop pines (Araucaria cunninhamii), silky oaks (Grevillea robusta), Lombardy poplars (Populus nigra "Italica", stone pines (Pinus pinea), Mediterranean cypresses (Cupressus sempervirens) and other species. Silky oaks and hoop pines remain dominant species in the canopy of trees around the park today.

Despite successive phases of improvements and embellishments throughout its history, Richmond Park retains the important visual and structural elements that contribute to the significance of the site to both the local community and the State. The pavilion, arguably the most dominant built structure within the Park, was built in 1882 but, following a fire in 1980, the Pavilion was severely damaged. After being comprehensively restored by 1994, although not entirely faithful to the original detailing of the building, the pavilion continues to be an important element in the historic character of the Park.

The Inter-war period bought further change to Richmond Park with the introduction of the Richmond to Kurrajong railway line across the south-east corner of the Park in 1924. When the rail lines were installed, trees were felled and vegetation removed but after the line was closed in 1952, the rails were removed and this corner of the Park reinstated and revegetated. In the late 1980s, an interpretative brick pathway and informative signage was installed in the same corner of the Park to be a permanent reminder of this point in the history of Richmond Park.

The late twentieth and early twenty-first centuries also bought considerable development to Richmond Park and not all of this was sympathetic to it heritage values. A rotunda was constructed in the north-west corner in 2002, in a style resembling that of the adjacent pavilion. With a neighbouring modern playground, these additions have, in some form, diminished the integrity of the Park.

The war memorial has also undergone some change, with the installation of two 1855 canons in the c. 1990s.

== Heritage listing ==
Richmond Park is of State significance as a rare surviving example of the town planning of Governor Lachlan Macquarie. Richmond was the first of five towns along the Hawkesbury River, personally selected by Governor Macquarie in 1810. When laying out the township in 1811, Macquarie reserved a central location for the development of this open green space for the community. Richmond Park has retained its original intention as an open public green space and continues to be a legible example of one of the key elements of Macquarie's town plan for Richmond.

Its central location within the urban environment has contributed to the continuity of use of Richmond Park by the community for 200 years. The cohesive landscape design, surviving from the mid-nineteenth century, is representative of early municipal parks in NSW and today, it retains precisely the association with the layout of central Richmond envisaged by Macquarie in 1810.

Richmond Park was listed on the New South Wales State Heritage Register on 5 March 2010 having satisfied the following criteria.

The place is important in demonstrating the course, or pattern, of cultural or natural history in New South Wales.

Historically, Richmond Park has State significance as a public park that was specifically reserved by Governor Lachlan Macquarie in 1810 for the new township of Richmond. The Park continues to demonstrate its original use as a marketplace, where the community could trade stock and crops, as well as its later use for more recreational activities (particularly as a cricket ground).

Richmond Park also continues to demonstrate the early community efforts to beautify the Park (c. 1880s) that resulted in the designed layout taking form.

Although Richmond Park has undergone various changes over the two centuries since the land was first marked out in 1810, this open greenspace continues to reflect Macquarie's original intention and it retains its significance as a distinguishing element in the townscape.

The place has a strong or special association with a person, or group of persons, of importance of cultural or natural history of New South Wales's history.

Richmond Park has State significance for its association with Governor Lachlan Macquarie. Following his appointment as Governor of NSW in 1810, Macquarie was instructed by the British Government to select five sites best suited for new townships along the Hawkesbury River. Richmond was the first to be chosen and when laid out, a 10-acre (4-hectare) plot of land in the centre of the town was reserved for the creation of a public park. This dedication of Crown land for public use was common with Macquarie's town planning practices, and the reserved park was to become a central marketplace for the new town and a site for the activities of the community.

The place is important in demonstrating aesthetic characteristics and/or a high degree of creative or technical achievement in New South Wales.

Richmond Park has local significance for its aesthetic values. As an open green space in the centre of town, the Park has always been a public landscape within an urban environment. The collection of plantations and cohesive design was intended to provide an attractive and pleasant environment for community recreation and, although the strength of the landscape design may have diminished since its inception, the Park retains its ability to provide an open green landscape for the enjoyment of the community. Its location and collection of fauna also continues to make the Park a distinguishing element in the Richmond townscape.

The cultural features of the Park, namely the pavilion and war memorial, also contribute to the aesthetic value of the site. The pavilion, although comprehensively restored in 1994, is a dominant built structure in the Park and continues to reflect the nineteenth-century character of the site. The war memorial, an important element of many municipal parks in NSW, is also an attractive and socially valuable feature of Richmond Park.

The place has strong or special association with a particular community or cultural group in New South Wales for social, cultural or spiritual reasons.

Richmond Park has local significance for its social value to the community. Originally reserved as a market square for the people of the new township, Richmond Park has been an important asset to the community and one that has been consistently used over two centuries. With a grassed oval for active recreation (particularly cricket) and available seating within an attractive landscape for passive enjoyment, the Park has been a valued space for the community and an attractive element of the Richmond townscape for 200 years.

By combining both active and passive recreation, commemoration and public sentiment, Richmond Park has been an open space well used by the local community. The types of use may have changed but its continuity of use has remained consistent.

The presence of a war memorial at the Park is also a significant feature that enables the community to commemorate the effort and loss of local soldiers in active service.

The place has potential to yield information that will contribute to an understanding of the cultural or natural history of New South Wales.

Richmond Park has been a greenspace site since European settlement and has undergone much change over the two centuries since its creation. As such, archaeological potential is likely to be low.

The interpretative pathway and signage that indicates the positioning of the Richmond to Kurrajong railway line (that ran across the south-east corner of the Park from 1934 to 1952) is, in its current state, largely inaccurate and misleading. There is potential, therefore, to investigate this site for the original alignment of this railway line.

The place possesses uncommon, rare or endangered aspects of the cultural or natural history of New South Wales.

Richmond Park has State significance for its rarity value in NSW. When Governor Macquarie was appointed in 1810, he was instructed by the British Government to select and survey five suitable sites along the Hawkesbury River for new townships. Of these five sites, Richmond was the first to be laid out in January 1811.

Originally conceived as a central marketplace for the new township, the survival of Richmond Park makes it a rare example of the town plan envisaged by Macquarie in 1810. The Park also retains its original intended use, being an open green space for the use of the community, which also contributes to its rarity value.

(See Comparisons in History for other surviving public parks reserved by Governor Macquarie)

The place is important in demonstrating the principal characteristics of a class of cultural or natural places/environments in New South Wales.

Richmond Park has State significance as a representative example of a municipal park that has retained and expanded its use and community value over 200 years. Dedicating Crown land for public purposes was a common element in early town planning, both in NSW and around the world, and Richmond Park is a good example of how a Park can evolve to suit the needs of the local community.

Positioned in the centre of Richmond, the Park has remained an open space for the activities of the local community throughout this time and, like many early parks, it has had a long history of cricket being played at the ground. Like many other parks in NSW, Richmond Park is a representative example of the simple and well-used landscape design of encircling a grassed cricket ground with a low fenced boundary and surrounding vegetation.

The inclusion of a war memorial is also a common feature in Australian parks. A place for commemoration to honour the war effort of local soldiers is a significant aspect of many parks and Richmond Park is a good example of how this feature continues to be important to the community (the Park now includes a pillar honouring the efforts in the current (2009) "International Campaign Against Terror").

Richmond Park is also representative of the landscape design and layout of a nineteenth-century public park in NSW. Plant species were provided to the Park by the Sydney Botanic Gardens in 1870 and 1873 and, at this time, most parks in NSW were heavily influenced by the style pioneered by Charles Moore, the Director of the Botanic Gardens, and his successor, Joseph Henry Maiden. With the collection of plants becoming increasingly complex, Richmond Park also took on the role of an arboretum which was typical of early municipal parks in NSW.

== See also ==
Media related to Richmond Park (New South Wales) at Wikimedia Commons
