= Bowman House, Richmond =

Bowman House
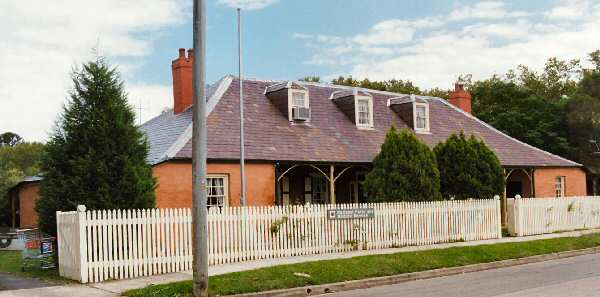

- Location within New South Wales Location within Australia
- 33.5949°S 150.7458°E
- Location: 368-370 Windsor Street, Richmond, City of Hawkesbury, New South Wales, Australia

History
- Built: 1817–1820

Site notes
- Owner: Hawkesbury City Council

New South Wales Heritage Register
- Official name: Bowman House; Bowman's Cottage
- Type: state heritage (built)
- Designated: 2 April 1999
- Reference no.: 468
- Type: House
- Category: Residential buildings (private)
- Builders: James Blackman

Bowman House is a heritage-listed former residence and now Hawkesbury Area Office of the National Parks and Wildlife Service at 368-370 Windsor Street, Richmond, New South Wales, an outer suburb of Sydney, Australia. It was built from 1817 to 1820 by James Blackman. It is also known as Bowman's Cottage. It was added to the New South Wales State Heritage Register on 2 April 1999.

== History ==
=== Indigenous occupation ===
The lower Hawkesbury was home to the Dharug people. The proximity to the Nepean River and South Creek qualifies it as a key area for food resources for indigenous groups. The Dharug and Darkinjung people called the river Deerubbin and it was a vital source of food and transport.

=== Non-indigenous occupation ===
Governor Arthur Phillip explored the local area in search of suitable agricultural land in 1789 and discovered and named the Hawkesbury River after Baron Hawkesbury. This region played a significant role in the early development of the colony with European settlers established here by 1794. Situated on fertile floodplains and well known for its abundant agriculture, Green Hills (as it was originally called) supported the colony through desperate times. However, frequent flooding meant that the farmers along the riverbanks were often ruined.

On 1 January 1810, Governor Lachlan Macquarie replaced Governor Bligh as Governor of New South Wales. Under Macquarie's influence the colony prospered. His vision was for a free community for white colonists, working in conjunction with the penal colony. He implemented an unrivalled public works program, completing 265 public buildings, establishing new public amenities and improving existing services such as roads. Under his leadership Hawkesbury district thrived. He visited the district on his first tour and recorded in his journal on 6 December 1810: "After dinner I chrestened the new townships...I gave the name of Windsor to the town intended to be erected in the district of the Green Hills...the township in the Richmond district I have named Richmond..." the district reminded Macquarie of those towns in England, whilst Castlereagh, Pitt Town and Wilberforce were named after English statesmen. These are often referred to as Macquarie's Five Towns. Their localities, chiefly Windsor and Richmond, became more permanent with streets, town square and public buildings.

Construction of Bowman Cottage was commenced in 1817 by James Blackman, the local constable and later gravedigger and sexton. Blackman erected the frame of a brick nog cottage during what turned out to be for him an all too brief period of prosperity. He was subsequently dismissed as constable and as a consequence found himself in financial difficulty which resulted in the forced sale of his property to George Bowman.

Bowman completed the cottage by 1820 and by 1824 it had attained its present appearance.

At the time the cottage was built Richmond was still a rustic town made up of clusters of buildings separated by paddocks and dense patches of bush. The bulk of the houses were built to timber and Bowman Cottage was one of the few substantial buildings. It was built close to Windsor Street on the edge of two acres of garden and vegetable beds.

A brick stable block stood at right angles to the rear of the house and parallel to this was a timber barn with a cobbled courtyard between. Both buildings have long disappeared except for a small section of the stables which still stands.

The cottage remained in the ownership of the Bowman family until the 1920s when George's twin sons Andrew and Edward began to subdivide the land. By 1930 the cottage was sold and subsequently divided into two semi-detached houses. It remained this way until it was purchased by the state Department of Environment and Planning.

The cottage was originally earmarked for demolition in order to make way for a housing development. It was saved when it was purchased by the Department of Environment and Planning in 1974, and restored to the tune of $300,000 over time.

Conservation of the building was commenced in 1982 and was carried out under the supervision of the Historic Buildings Group of the Department of Public Works.

Bowman Cottage in Richmond has a twin located 23 kilometres from Dunedoo in Warrumbungle Shire: the Merotherie Homestead, which George Bowman acquired and extended throughout the nineteenth century in the same style as his house in Richmond. Like his Richmond House, the core of Meruthera Homestead was built by an earlier occupant of the land, in this case, according to family legend, a shepherd who built a small house there in ironwood in the 1820s. George owned the property until his death in 1874 and in 2011 the house and some of the property it remained in the ownership of the Bowman family.

== Description ==
With its steeply pitched roof, dormer windows and surrounding stone flagged verandah the cottage typifies the early Australian farmhouse. Its detailing and fitments are colonial Georgian while the walls are brick nogged, a building technique once common in the Hawkesbury district, but now rare. Brick nog houses were built of brick set in a timber frame which was covered externally with weather boards.

Bowman Cottage is a colonial house of considerable character, though it has been altered superficially in some ways. (The stone flagged verandah has been spoilt by the erection of a partition and by the addition of clumsy bases to the verandah posts. The projecting rooms at each end of the verandah have been cement rendered.) The overhanging slate roof has three gable windows lighting the attic rooms. In the main section of the house the walls are of brick, set in timber uprights and overlaid with wooden planks, a method of building sometimes used by the early settlers. The weatherboard covering protected the soft sandstock bricks from deterioration.

There are few buildings of a similar age which have retained a comparable degree of originality and although Richmond has changed dramatically since the 1820s Bowman Cottage has not.

== Heritage listing ==
Bowman House is one of the earliest surviving houses in the state. Construction was commenced before 1818 by James Blackman and the house was acquired by George Bowman in 1818. He extended the brick-nog structure and completed it in 4 stages. The cottage was his home until his death in 1878.

Bowman House was listed on the New South Wales State Heritage Register on 2 April 1999 having satisfied the following criteria.

The place is important in demonstrating the course, or pattern, of cultural or natural history in New South Wales.

Bowman Cottage is one of the earliest surviving buildings in the state.

The place has a strong or special association with a person, or group of persons, of importance of cultural or natural history of New South Wales's history.

The cottage was built by James Blackman, a free settler, businessman, gravedigger and sexton. It was then acquired by George Bowman in 1818. Bowman came to the colony as a child of three with his parents. He went on to become the first Mayor of Richmond and lived in the cottage until his death in 1878.

In addition to being the first Mayor of Richmond, George Bowman was a Member of the New South Wales Legislative Council, a magistrate, explorer, pastoralist, land speculator, and Elder of the Presbyterian Church.

The place is important in demonstrating aesthetic characteristics and/or a high degree of creative or technical achievement in New South Wales.

With its steeply pitched roof, dormer windows and surrounding stone flagged verandah the cottage typifies the early Australian farmhouse. Its detailing and fitments are colonial Georgian while the walls are brick nogged, a building technique once common in Hawkesbury but now rare.

The place has strong or special association with a particular community or cultural group in New South Wales for social, cultural or spiritual reasons.

The Bowman family has a long history of distinction and influence in the Hawkesbury region. They are very significant in the history of the growth and development of both Richmond and the Hawkesbury region. Bowman Cottage is one of the oldest surviving homes in New South Wales and has been in the ownership of the Bowman family until its subdivision and sale in 1930. It was also the preferred and chosen residence of George Bowman, the first Mayor of Richmond, who lived in the cottage until his death in 1878, despite having the means to move to more luxurious lodgings.

The place possesses uncommon, rare or endangered aspects of the cultural or natural history of New South Wales.

At the time it was built, Bowman Cottage was one of very few substantial buildings in the Richmond area. Richmond, at the time, was still a very rustic town and made up of clusters of buildings separated by paddocks and dense patches of bush. The bulk of the houses in the area were simply built of timber.

The place is important in demonstrating the principal characteristics of a class of cultural or natural places/environments in New South Wales.

The colonial Georgian style of Bowman Cottage is representative of the typical Australian Farmhouse of its time.
