= Hawkesbury Guineas =

- Class: Group 3
- Location: Hawkesbury Racecourse, Clarendon, New South Wales, Australia
- Inaugurated: 2000
- Race type: Thoroughbred - flat
- Sponsor: Elite Sand & Soil (2025 & 2026)

Race information
- Distance: 1,400 metres
- Surface: Turf
- Track: Right-handed
- Qualification: Three-year-olds
- Weight: Set weights with penalties
- Purse: A$250,000 (2026)

The Hawkesbury Guineas is a Hawkesbury Racing Club Group 3 Thoroughbred horse race for three-year-olds at set weights with penalties, over a distance of 1600 metres, held at Hawkesbury Racecourse in Clarendon, New South Wales, Australia.

== History ==
=== Distance ===
- 2000–2004 – 1200 metres
- 2006 onwards - 1400 metres

=== Grade ===
- 2000–2013 - Listed Race
- 2014 onwards - Group 3

=== Conditions ===
- 2000–2004 - Handicap
- 2006 onwards - Set weights with penalties

=== Other venues ===
- 2015 - Rosehill Racecourse
- 2020 - Rosehill Racecourse

=== Recent multiple victories ===
Jockeys

- James McDonald in 2014, 2019 and 2024.

Trainers

- Peter Snowden in 2012, 2013 and 2025 and in partnership with Paul Snowden in 2019 and 2021
- Gai Waterhouse in 2005, 2008 and 2015 and in partnership with Adrian Bott in 2020 and 2023
- John Hawkes in 2000 and 2003 and in partnership with Michael & Wayne Hawkes in 2014 and 2022.

== Winners ==
The following are past winners of the race.

- 2026 - Skyhook
- 2025 - Media World
- 2024 - Schwarz
- 2023 - Hawaii Five Oh
- 2022 - Mr Mozart
- 2021 - Exoboom
- 2020 - Dawn Passage
- 2019 - Military Zone
- 2018 - Sambro
- 2017 - Shazee Lee
- 2016 - Spill The Beans
- 2015 - ‡Najoom
- 2014 - Chautauqua
- 2013 - Limes
- 2012 - Free Wheeling
- 2011 - Pimpala Secret
- 2010 - Neeson
- 2009 - Related
- 2008 - Royal Discretion
- 2007 - Alverta
- 2006 - The Free Stater
- 2005 - †race not held
- 2004 - Roadagain
- 2003 (Dec.) - Sweet Marmalade
- 2003 (Feb.) - Pearly Kings
- 2002 - Shags
- 2001 - De Valmont
- 2000 - Hire

† Not held because of schedule change in racing calendar
‡ Race meeting abandoned after the first race on the card due to prolonged rain that affected the state of the track Race held the following week at Rosehill Racecourse.

== See also ==
- Hawkesbury Crown
- Hawkesbury Gold Cup
- List of Australian Group races
- Group races
