= Clear Oaks =

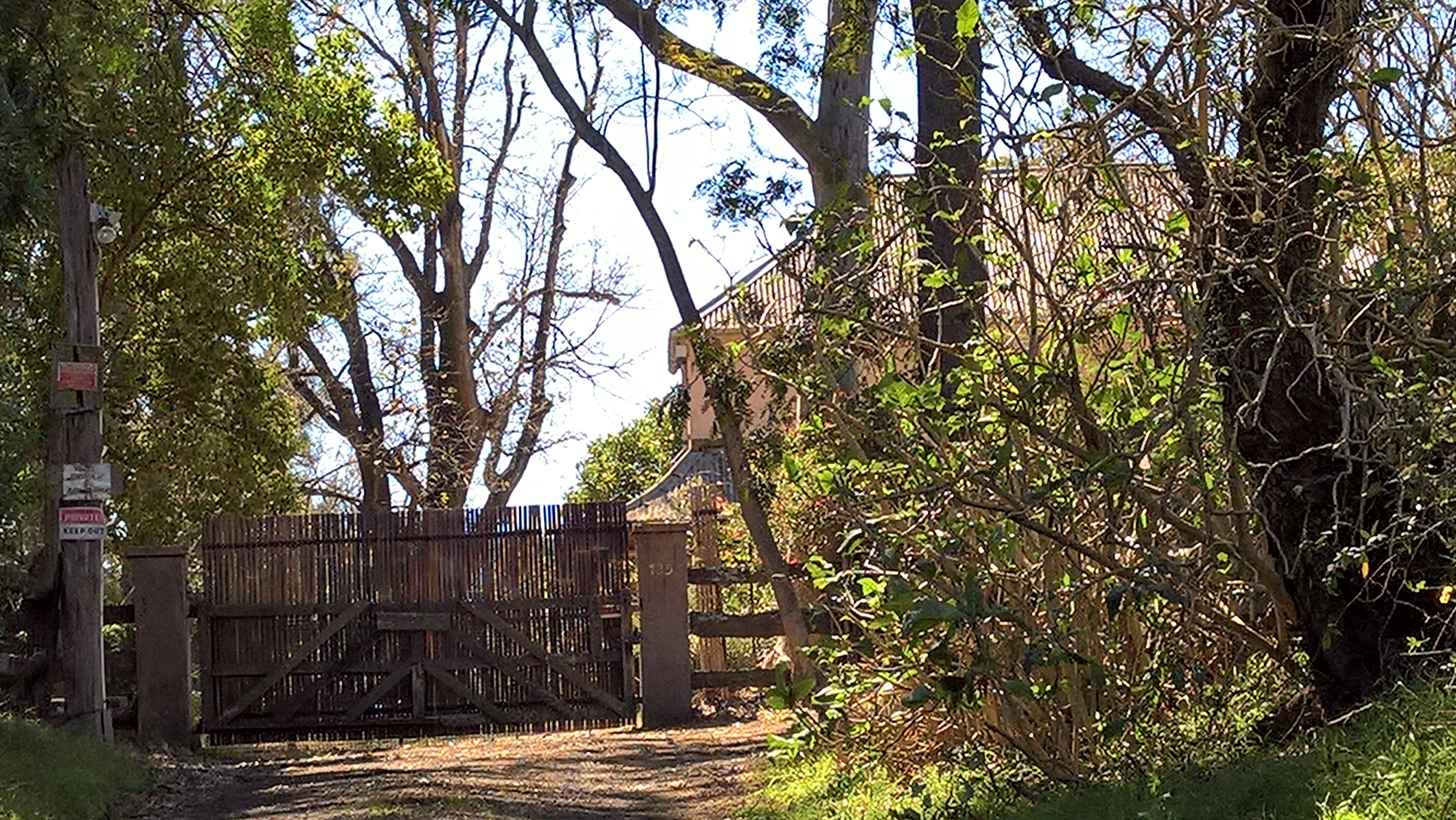
- Clear Oaks 135 Francis Street, Richmond, New South Wales

- Location within New South Wales Location within Australia
- 33.5936°S 150.7493°E
- Location: 135 Francis Street, Richmond, City of Hawkesbury, New South Wales, Australia

History
- Built: 1809

New South Wales Heritage Register
- Official name: Clear Oaks Moxey's Farm House; Moxey's Farm
- Type: state heritage (complex / group)
- Designated: 2 April 1999
- Reference no.: 58
- Type: Homestead Complex
- Category: Farming and Grazing

Clear Oaks is a heritage-listed homestead complex at 135 Francis Street, Richmond, New South Wales, an outer suburb of Sydney, Australia. It was built in c. 1809. It is also known as Moxey's Farm House. It was added to the New South Wales State Heritage Register on 2 April 1999.

== History ==
The lower Hawkesbury was home to the Dharug people. The proximity to the Nepean River and South Creek qualifies it as a key area for food resources for indigenous groups. The Dharug and Darkinjung people called the river Deerubbin and it was a vital source of food and transport.

Governor Arthur Phillip explored the local area in search of suitable agricultural land in 1789 and discovered and named the Hawkesbury River after Baron Hawkesbury. This region played a significant role in the early development of the colony with European settlers established here by 1794. Situated on fertile floodplains and well known for its abundant agriculture, Green Hills (as it was originally called) supported the colony through desperate times. However, frequent flooding meant that the farmers along the riverbanks were often ruined.

Clear Oaks is located on part of a grant of 100 acres made in 1804 Governor King to the free settler David Langley. Research by Alan Byrnes has shown that Clear Oaks was built for Langley. It is probable that a James Vincent was involved with the actual building.

One decade after being built in around 1809, Langley sold the property to a Joseph Onus in 1819. It is likely Onus improved the building by bagging (rendering).

== Description ==
Clear Oaks is a two-storey brick stuccoed farmhouse of law proportions. It features an encircling verandah to ground floor supported on timber posts, gabled roof sloping at rear, nine pane windows, and unusual six pane exterior doors. The majority of the joinery is intact.

The siting is important, and the heritage listing includes the land to the roads and to the bottom of the hill behind.

== Heritage listing ==
Clear Oaks is a good representative example of the Colonial Georgian farmhouse of the Hawkesbury valley. It makes a contribution to the townscape, as the house fills the northern vista of Bosworth Street.

Clear Oaks Moxey's Farm House was listed on the New South Wales State Heritage Register on 2 April 1999.
