= Richmond, New South Wales =

Richmond
- Town
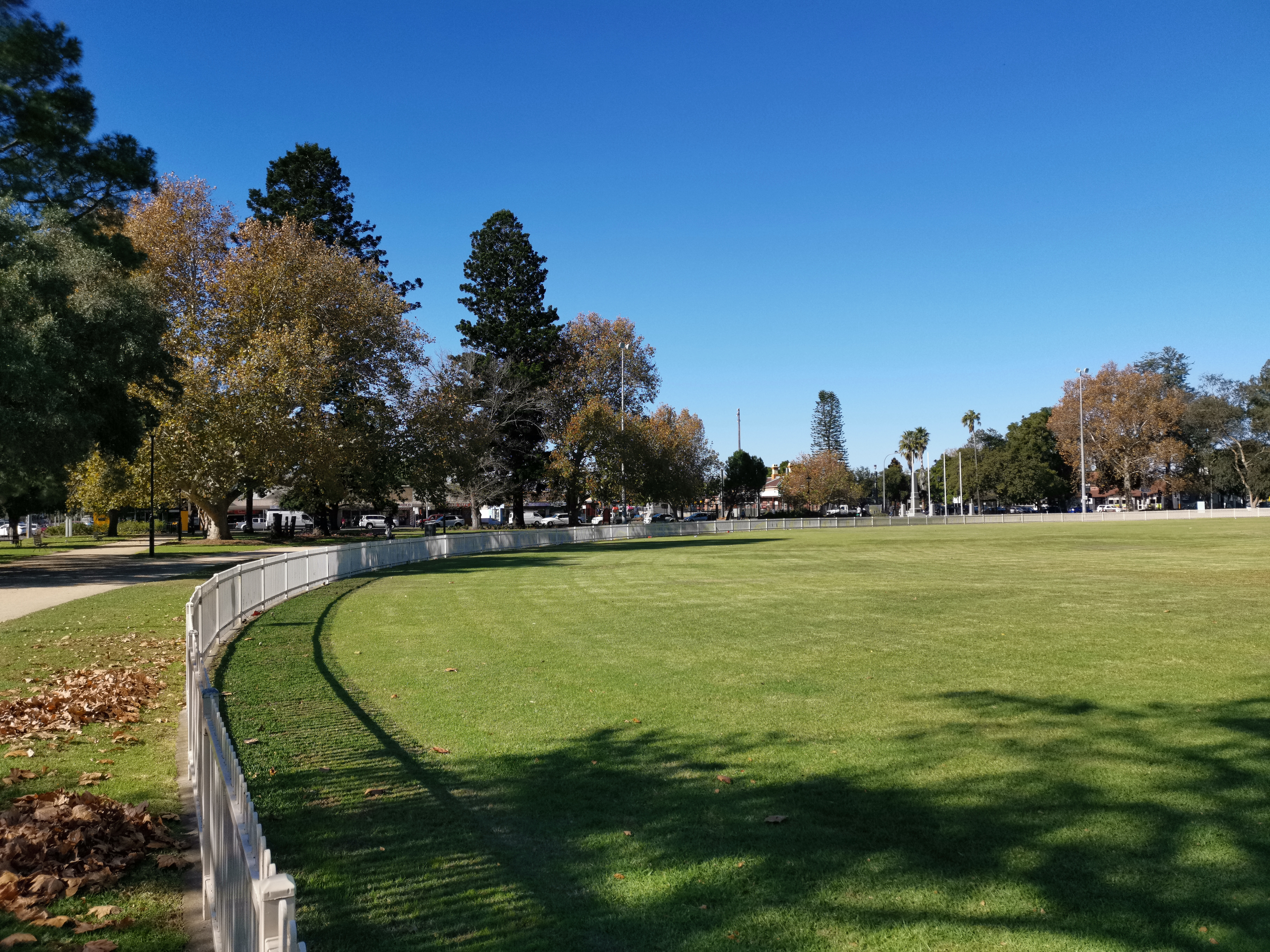
- Richmond Oval

- Interactive map of Richmond
- Coordinates: 33°36′S 150°45′E
- Country: Australia
- State: New South Wales
- City: Sydney
- LGA: City of Hawkesbury
- Location: 7 km (4.3 mi) W of Windsor; 62 km (39 mi) NW of Sydney; 78 km (48 mi) ESE of Lithgow
- Established: 1794

Government
  - State electorate: Hawkesbury
  - Federal division: Macquarie
- Elevation: 19 m (62 ft)

Population
  - Total: 5,418 (2021 census)
- Postcode: 2753
- Mean max temp: 24.0 °C (75.2 °F)
- Mean min temp: 11.0 °C (51.8 °F)
- Annual rainfall: 738.5 mm (29.07 in)
Localities around Richmond
North Richmond	Cornwallis and Richmond Lowlands	Cornwallis and Clarendon
Agnes Banks	Richmond	Clarendon and Windsor
Agnes Banks	Hobartville and Londonderry	South Windsor

Richmond is an outer suburb of northwest Sydney in New South Wales, Australia. Once a historic town, Richmond is in the local government area of the City of Hawkesbury and is part of the Sydney metropolitan area. It is located 19 metres above sea level on the alluvial Hawkesbury River flats, at the foot of the Blue Mountains. It is about 62 km by road from the Sydney CBD, 22 km from Penrith, 25 km from Blacktown, 39 km from Parramatta, 78 km from Lithgow and 7 km from Windsor. Richmond is now part of the Sydney urban area, and has access to various amenities including supermarkets, cafes, a Sydney train line, shopping centres, schools, a TAFE campus and a Western Sydney University Campus called the Hawkesbury Campus

== History ==
The Darug people have inhabited the area around Richmond for tens of thousands of years.

The area was first explored by British settlers in 1789 and the nearby eminence to the west of the Hawkesbury River was known by them as 'Richmond Hill'. The name was given by Governor Arthur Phillip, in honour of Charles Lennox, the third Duke of Richmond who was Master General of Ordnance in the Pitt administration. Richmond was the fifth oldest area to have European settlement in Australia after Sydney, Parramatta, Kingston and Windsor. The first 22 European settlers came to the area in 1794 and established town. They came to farm a total of 12 hectares (30 acres) in what is now Pitt Town Bottoms. They needed good farming land to help overcome the desperate need for food in the new colony. By 1799 this region was producing about half the grain produced in the colony.

The Battle of Richmond Hill took place in May and June 1795 between the Darug people and British Marines.

Around 1811 Macquarie officially established the five Macquarie Towns in the area: Windsor, Richmond, Castlereagh, Wilberforce and Pitt Town. One of the early settlers, James Blackman, built Bowman Cottage from brick nog, a common construction technique in the colony, using money borrowed from William Cox. The house was constructed between the years 1815 and 1818. James was unable to pay his debts and was forced to sell the property to George Bowman. The building was restored by the NSW Public Works Department and then became a Division of the Australian Foundation for the Disabled, providing employment for disabled people.

During WWII the RAAF operated a top secret operations bunker from somewhere in Richmond. It was either half or completely underground. The location of this bunker is unknown but it has been reported that this bunker was identical to the Bankstown Bunker which is currently buried under a public park in Bankstown. It has also been reported that this bunker could still be intact.

RAAF Base Richmond is a Royal Australian Air Force base at Richmond which was established in 1923. The air base is currently the home to the RAAF's transport squadrons. During the Vietnam War, logistic support and medical evacuations were supplied by the C-130 Hercules aircraft from RAAF Richmond.

Hawkesbury Agricultural College was the first agriculture college in NSW started in 1891 later amalgamated into Western Sydney University, Hawkesbury Campus.

== Attractions and Heritage listings ==
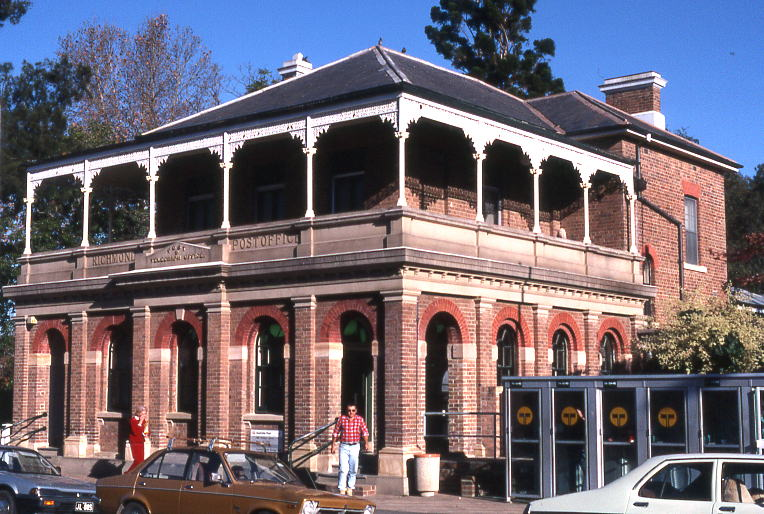
Richmond Old Post Office

Major Attractions in Richmond are Richmond Oval, Pughs Lagoon, Smith Park, Richmond School of Arts, St Andrews Church, Yarramundi Reserve, Hawkesbury Race Club, Richmond Club, Polo Club, Richmond Good Food Market on Saturday morning and Hawkesbury Valley Way Visitor Centre with view of RAAF Base Airport and Maple Trees.

Richmond has a number of heritage-listed sites, including:

- Blacktown-Richmond railway: Richmond railway station
- 24 Bosworth Street: Seymours House
- 49–51 Bosworth Street: New Inn
- Bounded by East Market, Windsor and March Streets: Richmond Park
- 135 Francis Street: Clear Oaks
- 22 Inalls Lane: Mountain View
- Kurrajong Road: Hobartville
- 126 Windsor Street
- 157 Windsor Street: Toxana
- 257–259 Windsor Street: Allison's Pharmacy
- 286 Windsor Street: Richmond Post Office
- 294 Windsor Street: Commercial Bank Company now a Garden Cafe
- 368–370 Windsor Street: Bowman House
- 38 Bourke Street: Old St Monica's Catholic Church Richmond
- 384 Windsor Street: St Peter's Anglican Church
- 145 Windsor Street: The Regent Richmond (cinema)
- Hawkesbury Agricultural College, now known as Western Sydney University, Hawkesbury Campus

== Population ==
According to the 2021 census of Population, there were 5,418 people in Richmond.

- Aboriginal and Torres Strait Islander people made up 4.4% of the population.
- 72.5% of people were born in Australia.
- The median age was 43.
- 1,242 families and 2,479 private dwellings was registered.
- The most common responses for religion were No Religion 31.1%, Catholic 19.2% and Anglican 17.2%.

== Education ==
Richmond has a range of educational facilities, from primary and high schools to Technical and Further Education (TAFE) and the Hawkesbury Campus of Western Sydney University originally Hawkesbury Agricultural College.

There are three primary schools in Richmond: Richmond Public School, Hobartville Public School and St Monica's Catholic Primary School. High Schools located in Richmond are Richmond High School and Centre of Excellence in Agriculture Education (Richmond Agriculture College-partnered with TAFE and WSU).

== Geography ==
The expansion of the Sydney suburban area has almost reached Richmond and it is now considered to be an outer suburb of Sydney. Bells Line of Road which leads into, over and across the Blue Mountains, finishing in Lithgow, starts in Richmond. Richmond railway station is the terminus of the Richmond branch. Richmond is surrounded by the 329 km^{2} Richmond Woodlands Important Bird Area, identified as such by BirdLife International because of the importance of the patches of remnant eucalypt woodland it contains for endangered regent honeyeaters and swift parrots. Numerous times Richmond area has been flooded as its staying near to Hawkesbury River.

Richmond is surrounded by 1327 hectares land of Western Sydney University Hawkesbury campus, 270 hectares land of RAAF Base Richmond Airport and Richmond Lowlands near Hawkesbury River. So it is the one and only isolated town in Sydney without having high density housing and population. Small remnants of the Western Sydney Dry Rainforest occur within the suburb.

== Transport ==
Richmond is connected with road, rail, water (Hawkebury River) and air (RAAF Base Richmond) network. Major roads are Richmond Road to Blacktown, M7 and Sydney; Hawkesbury Valley Way to Windsor, A2, M2 and Sydney; Bells Line of Road to Kurrajong, Bilpin and Lithgow; Londonderry Road to Penrith and Castlereagh Road to Blue Mountains and Penrith. Richmond Railway Station which is a terminus, serves T1 and T5 Sydney Train Networks in Richmond railway line with a service every half an hour to Sydney Central or Leppington. RAAF Base Richmond is a Defence Airport whereas nearby public airports are Sydney Airport and Western Sydney Airport (under construction). Bus services are to Windsor, Penrith (via Londonderry and Agnes Banks), Kurrajong, Bligh Park, Grose Vale, Berambing and night bus service to Sydney (Town Hall Park St). Hawkesbury River is the main reason settlement happened in the Richmond area with boats and cruises. Still people are using river for recreational purposes.

== Climate ==
Richmond has a humid subtropical climate (Köppen: Cfa/Cwa) with hot summers and cool winters. Due to its inland location, Richmond has hotter summer days than Sydney CBD, with temperatures sometimes reaching highs of 42 °C (108 °F). Richmond's extreme summer temperatures are also credited to föhn wind sweeping off the Central Tablelands down into the foothills of the suburb. Winter nights are colder than Sydney CBD's and they can drop below 0 °C (32 °F) with significant frost. Richmond has 91.5 days of clear skies annually, in contrast to Sydney CBD's 104 days. On 14 January 1939, Richmond recorded a temperature of 47.8 °C (118.0 °F), the highest in the Sydney region until a 2020 reading of 48.9 °C (120.0 °F) at Penrith. Its lowest maximum winter temperature was 7.6 °C (45.7 °F), recorded on 6 July 1957.

After Mitchell, Queensland, Richmond has the second largest overall temperature range recorded in Australia; −8.3 °C (17.1 °F) to 47.8 °C (118.0 °F), a range of 56.1 °C.

Richmond area is considered as a flood prone area as its staying near to Hawkesbury River and when Warragamba Dam opens water will fill around Richmond area.

Climate data for Richmond RAAF (>1928)
Month	Jan	Feb	Mar	Apr	May	Jun	Jul	Aug	Sep	Oct	Nov	Dec	Year
Record high °C (°F)	47.8 (118.0)	47.0 (116.6)	41.9 (107.4)	38.2 (100.8)	30.0 (86.0)	26.8 (80.2)	27.9 (82.2)	31.3 (88.3)	36.9 (98.4)	40.4 (104.7)	45.3 (113.5)	45.0 (113.0)	47.8 (118.0)
Mean daily maximum °C (°F)	30.3 (86.5)	29.0 (84.2)	27.0 (80.6)	23.9 (75.0)	20.3 (68.5)	17.6 (63.7)	17.2 (63.0)	18.8 (65.8)	21.5 (70.7)	24.5 (76.1)	26.8 (80.2)	28.8 (83.8)	23.8 (74.8)
Mean daily minimum °C (°F)	17.6 (63.7)	17.7 (63.9)	15.6 (60.1)	11.6 (52.9)	7.6 (45.7)	5.1 (41.2)	3.6 (38.5)	4.4 (39.9)	8.0 (46.4)	11.0 (51.8)	14.2 (57.6)	16.0 (60.8)	11.0 (51.9)
Record low °C (°F)	8.9 (48.0)	6.4 (43.5)	3.9 (39.0)	−0.4 (31.3)	−2.4 (27.7)	−6.7 (19.9)	−8.3 (17.1)	−4.0 (24.8)	−1.4 (29.5)	1.7 (35.1)	3.6 (38.5)	5.0 (41.0)	−8.3 (17.1)
Average precipitation mm (inches)	75.7 (2.98)	122.9 (4.84)	75.8 (2.98)	48.6 (1.91)	48.9 (1.93)	47.5 (1.87)	28.5 (1.12)	33.2 (1.31)	48.4 (1.91)	50.6 (1.99)	82.7 (3.26)	82.7 (3.26)	719.0 (28.31)
Average precipitation days (≥ 0.2 mm)	11.3	11.8	11.3	9.6	10.2	9.1	8.1	6.4	7.3	8.9	12.1	10.6	117.5
Average afternoon relative humidity (%)	50	54	52	53	54	55	49	45	42	45	45	48	49
Source 1: (averages)
Source 2: (humidity and records only)

== Notable Personalities ==
Some of the notable personalities born or lived in Richmond are:

- Michelle Goszko
- Ashton Irwin
- Aaron Jeffery
- Reg Lye
- Ray Martin
- Breaker Morant
- Doug Mulray
- Steve O'Keefe
- Kevin Rozzoli
- Norman Leslie Smith
- Stuart Smith
- Grigor Taylor
- Mike Walsh

== Gallery ==
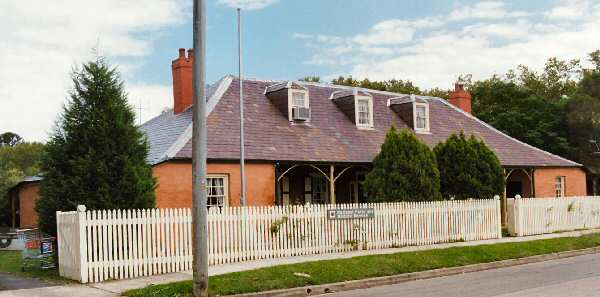
Bowman Cottage 1815–1818, built in the Colonial style

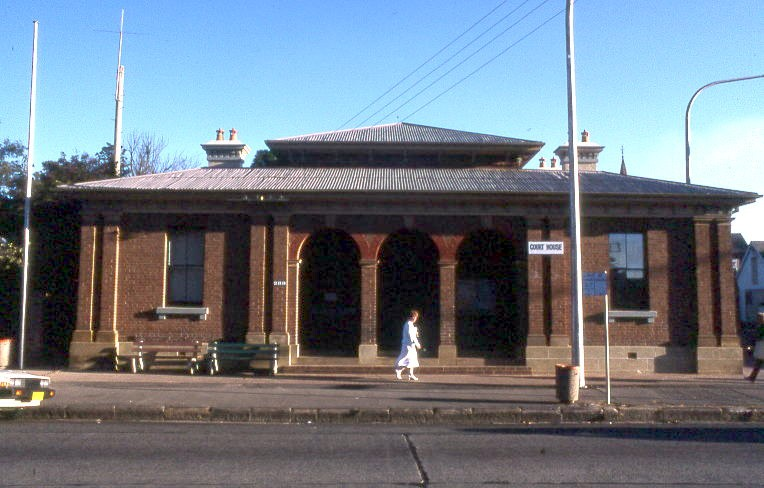
Richmond Court House

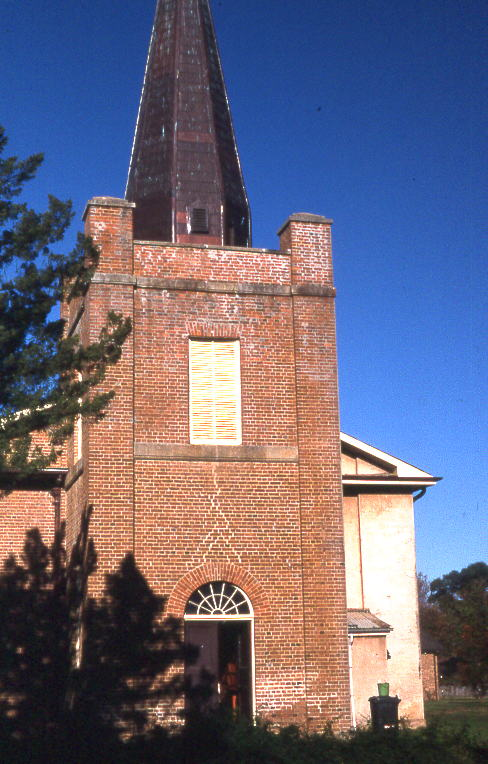
St Peter's Church

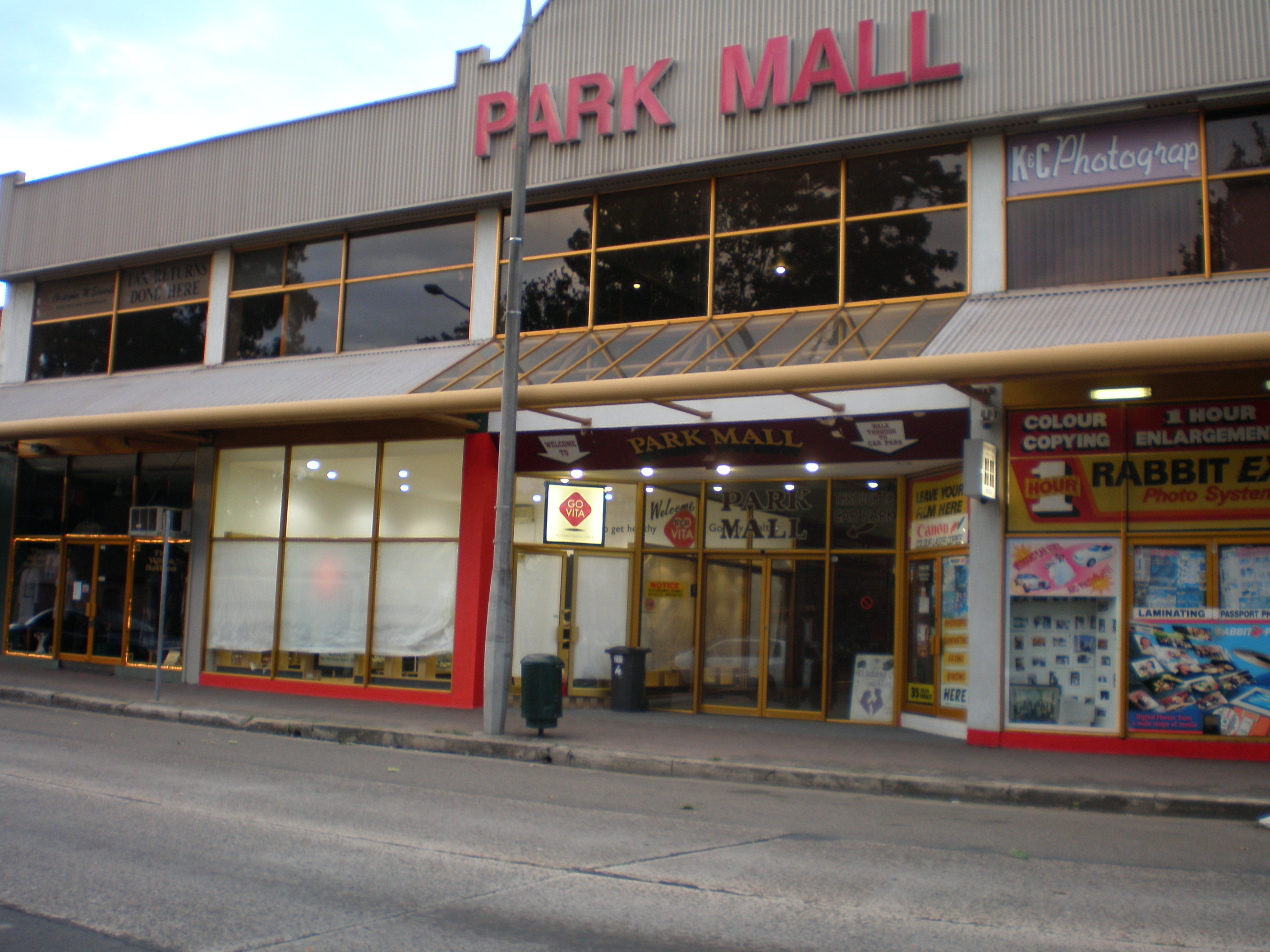
Park Mall, Richmond

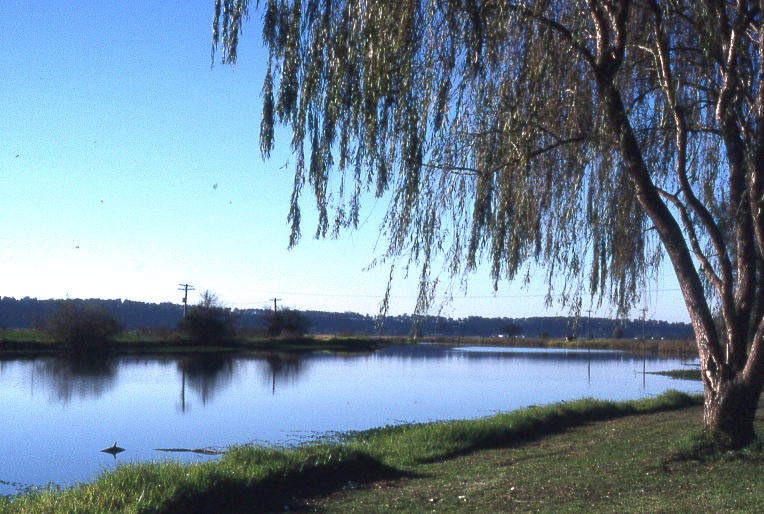
Pugh's Lagoon

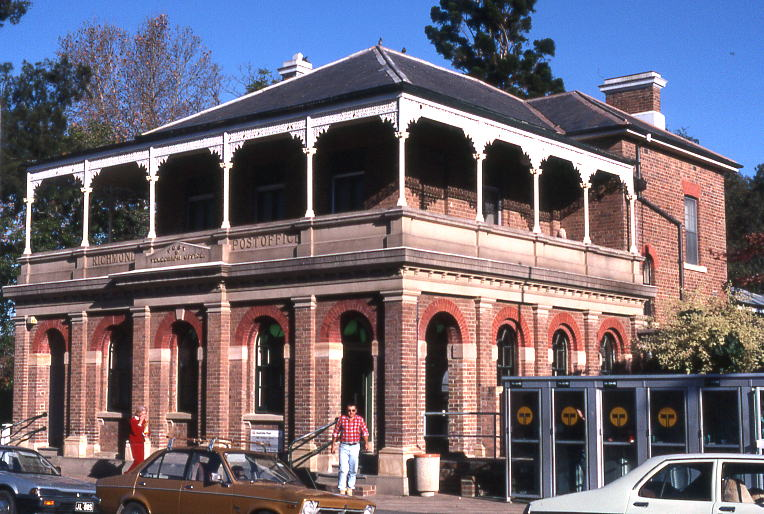
Old Post Office Richmond

== Bibliography ==
- Boughton, Samuel. Reminiscences of Richmond - From the Forties Down. Cathy McHardy, 2010.
- Lewis, Judith. ‘A History of the Richmond Railway Line: 1864- 2014.’ Riverstone & District Historical Society and Museum. https://www.riverstonehistoricalsociety.org.au/blog/?page_id=1966

== See also ==
- Towns in New South Wales
- Climate of Sydney
