= 126 Windsor Street, Richmond =

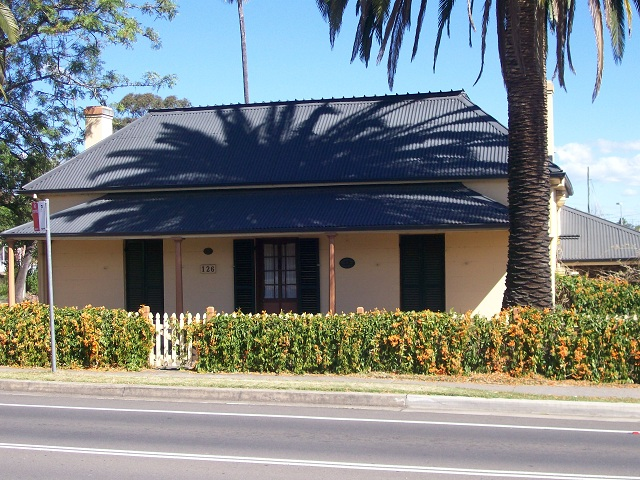

- Location within Sydney Location within Australia
- 33°35′57″S 150°45′18″E
- Location: 126 Windsor Street, Richmond, City of Hawkesbury, New South Wales, Australia

New South Wales Heritage Register
- Official name: House
- Type: State heritage (built)
- Designated: 2 April 1999
- Reference no.: 45
- Type: House
- Category: Residential buildings (private)

126 Windsor Street, Richmond is a heritage-listed residence in the outer Sydney suburb of Richmond, New South Wales, Australia. It is also known as the Home of John Town and Heritage Cottage. It was added to the New South Wales State Heritage Register on 2 April 1999.

== History ==
126 Windsor Street was built c. 1840 for ex-convict turned successful businessman John Town (senior) and his wife Mary Pickett. Town had arrived in Australia in 1800 and after gaining his freedom had operated a milling business at Kurrajong.

In the late 1970s, the building was threatened with demolition for a planned car yard. Demolition had already commenced when the building was purchased by the state government on the advice of the Heritage Council of New South Wales, the first to be acquired under new heritage preservation powers. The work on 126 Windsor Street was intended to serve as an example of the way a building in poor condition which was threatened by demolition can be restored and given a new lease of life at a moderate cost.

The Heritage Council auctioned the property in 1985. It was at some stage used as "Heritage Cottage", a museum and coffee shop, but this is no longer operating.

== Description ==
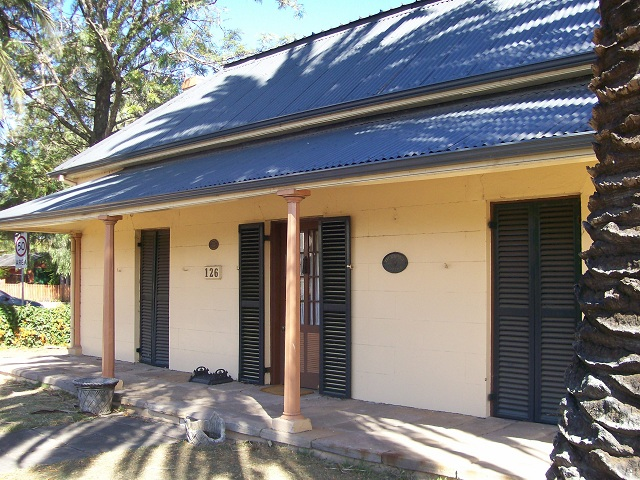
French windows

126 Windsor Street is a single-storey cottage of three bays with a two-storey wing running parallel to the side street. It is constructed of brick, stuccoed and painted on exterior. Main roof is hipped and of iron, verandah roof is supported on turned timber columns. Exterior joinery is mostly intact. Particularly fine is the reeded panelling of the French windows. The grounds retain some mature trees.

== Significance ==
A fine example of a mid-nineteenth century Australian colonial town dwelling. It is also a very important part of the townscape of Richmond as it is the only such dwelling remaining on the Sydney approaches.

== Heritage listing ==
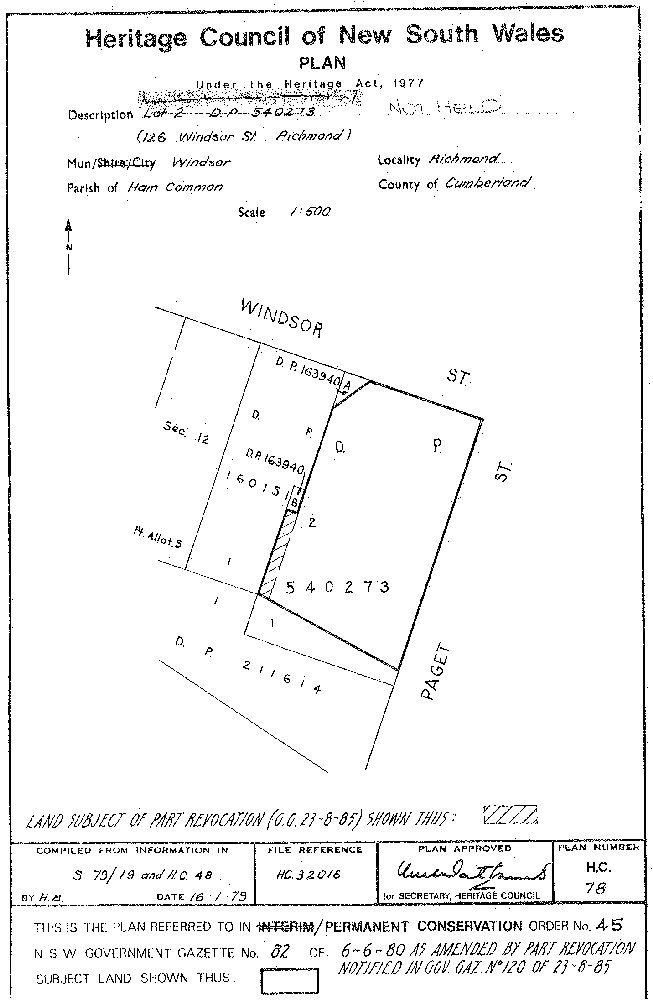
Heritage boundaries

126 Windsor Street, Richmond was listed on the New South Wales State Heritage Register on 2 April 1999.
