= Allison's Pharmacy =

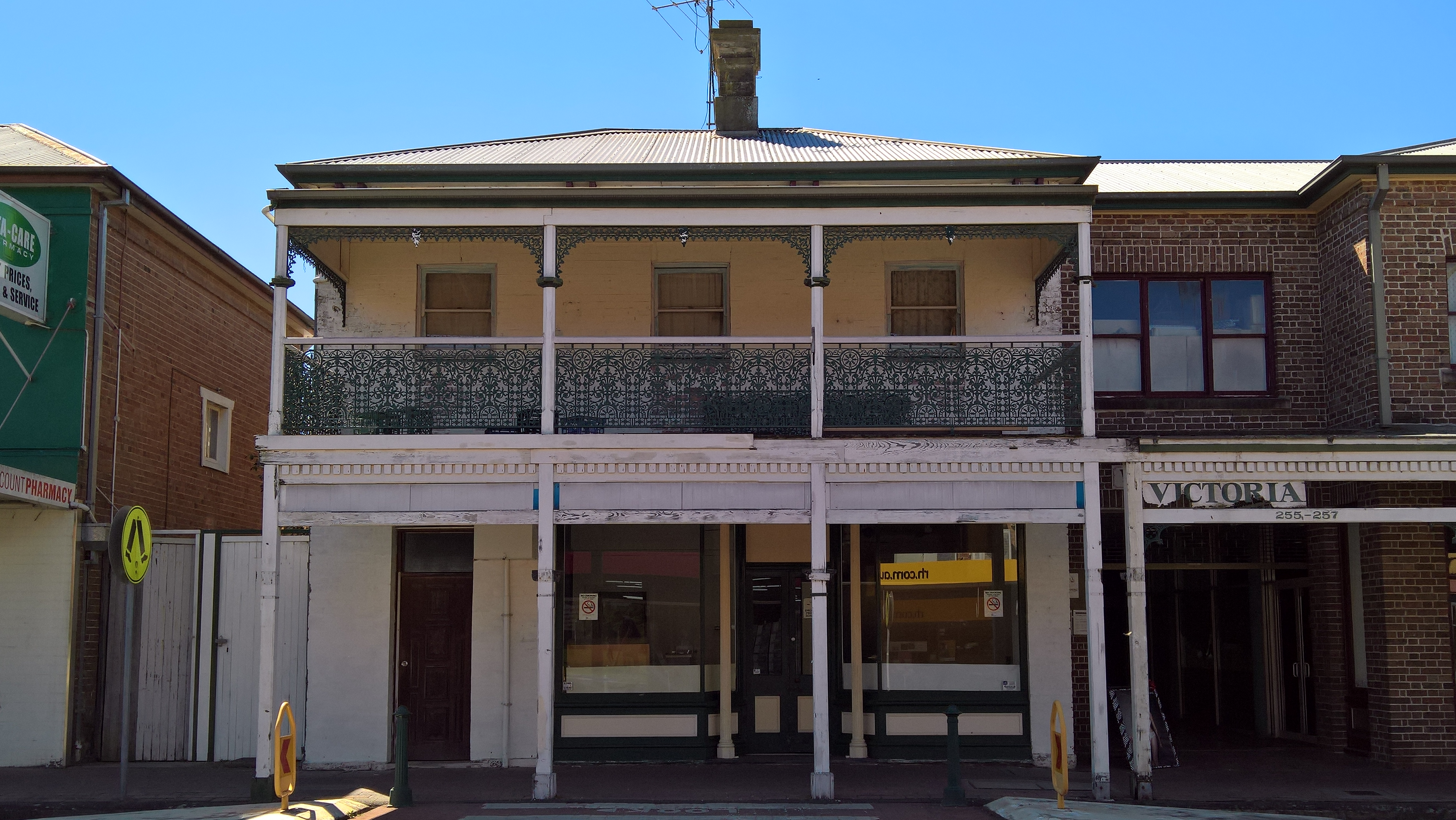
- The former Allison's Pharmacy, 257 Windsor Street, Richmond, New South Wales.

- Location within Sydney Location within Australia
- 33°35′46″S 150°45′00″E
- Location: 257-259 Windsor Street, Richmond, City of Hawkesbury, New South Wales, Australia

New South Wales Heritage Register
- Official name: Building
- Type: State heritage (built)
- Designated: 2 April 1999
- Reference no.: 610
- Type: House
- Category: Residential buildings (private)

Allison's Pharmacy is a heritage-listed commercial building at 257-259 Windsor Street, Richmond, New South Wales, an outer suburb of Sydney, Australia. It was added to the New South Wales State Heritage Register on 2 April 1999.

== History ==
Allison's Pharmacy is a nineteenth-century commercial building. It was acquired by pharmacist and dentist Joseph W. Allison from a Mr. Hawkins in 1890. Allison renovated the property to include facilities for his dental operations. His son succeeded him in the business, which operated out of the building until at least 1940, but had ceased operation some time before J. W. Allison's death in 1945. Advertising signage from the Allison business remains partially visible, though now obscured by the adjoining arcade.

By 1954, an estate agent was operating from the building. The building was vacant in February 2017.

== Heritage listing ==
Allison's Pharmacy was listed on the New South Wales State Heritage Register on 2 April 1999.
