= Seymours House =

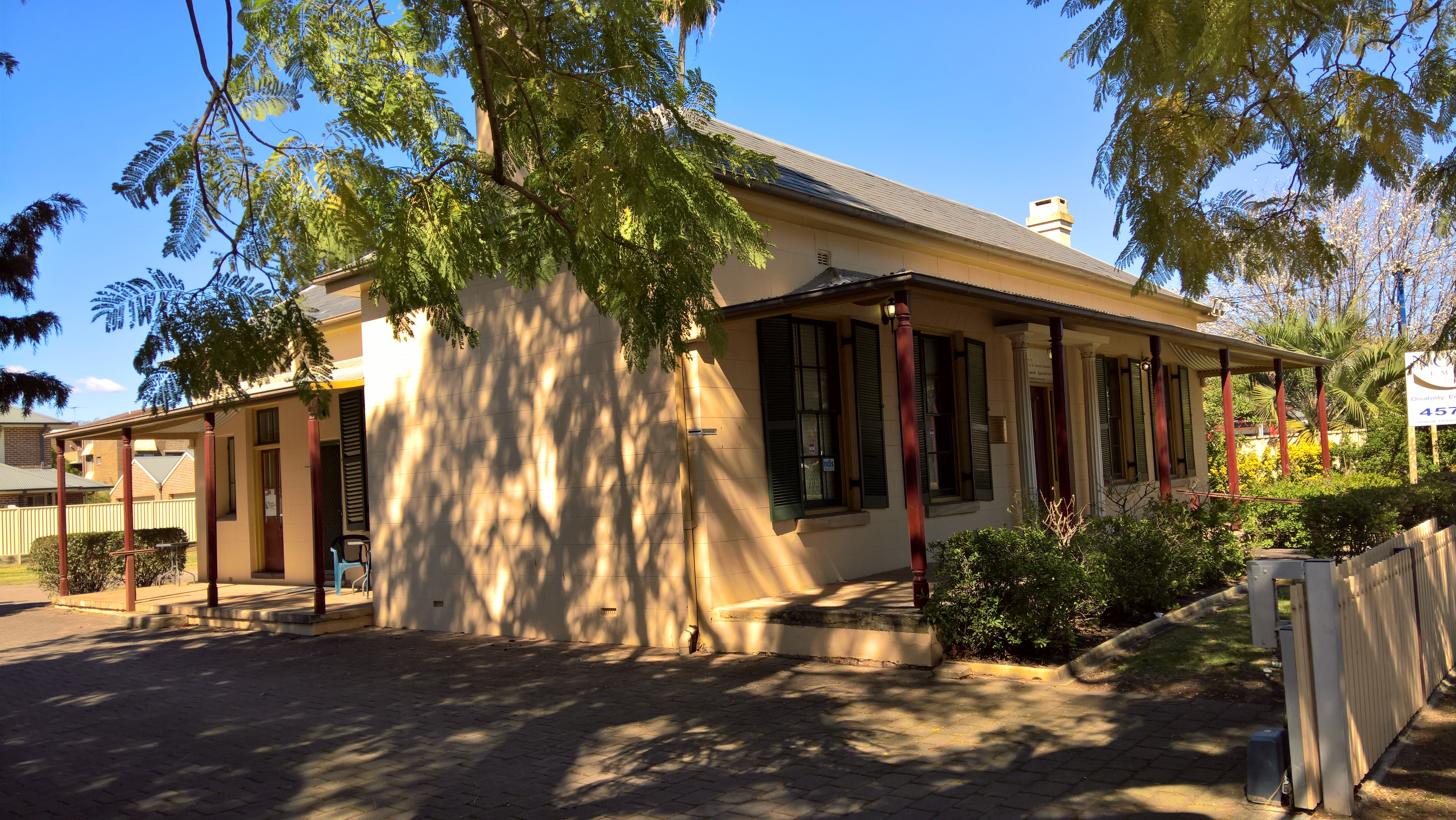
- Seymours House, 24 Bosworth Street, Richmond, NSW.

- Location within New South Wales Location within Australia
- 33.5964°S 150.7477°E
- Location: 24 Bosworth Street, Richmond, City of Hawkesbury, New South Wales, Australia

New South Wales Heritage Register
- Official name: Seymours House
- Type: state heritage (built)
- Designated: 2 April 1999
- Reference no.: 681
- Type: House
- Category: Residential buildings (private)

Seymours House is a heritage-listed residence and now offices at 24 Bosworth Street, Richmond, City of Hawkesbury, New South Wales, Australia. It was added to the New South Wales State Heritage Register on 2 April 1999.

== History ==
Seymours House was built c. 1840s. It is named after a family who had owned the property. Prior to the 1970s, the house was converted into flats and stripped of many original details, but was subsequently significantly restored. It has now been converted to commercial offices.

== Description ==
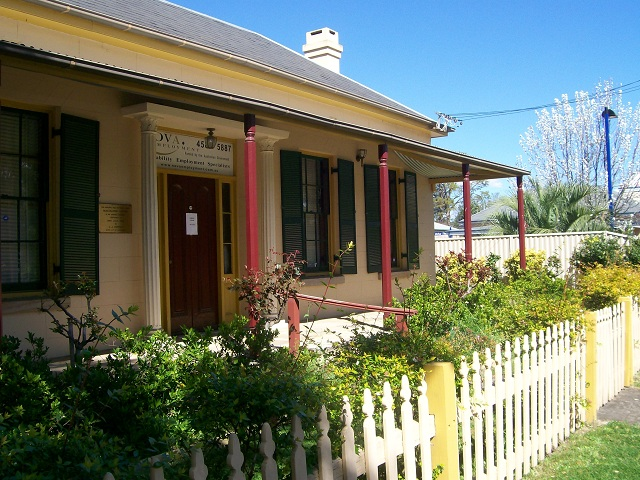
View along the verandah

Seymours House is a late Georgian stuccoed brick townhouse, five bays wide, and originally covered by a bellcast iron verandah roof. It features shuttered twelve paned windows and an original central front door with elegant sidelights and fanlight. A slate hipped roof and service wing extend at right angles to the rear.

== Heritage listing ==
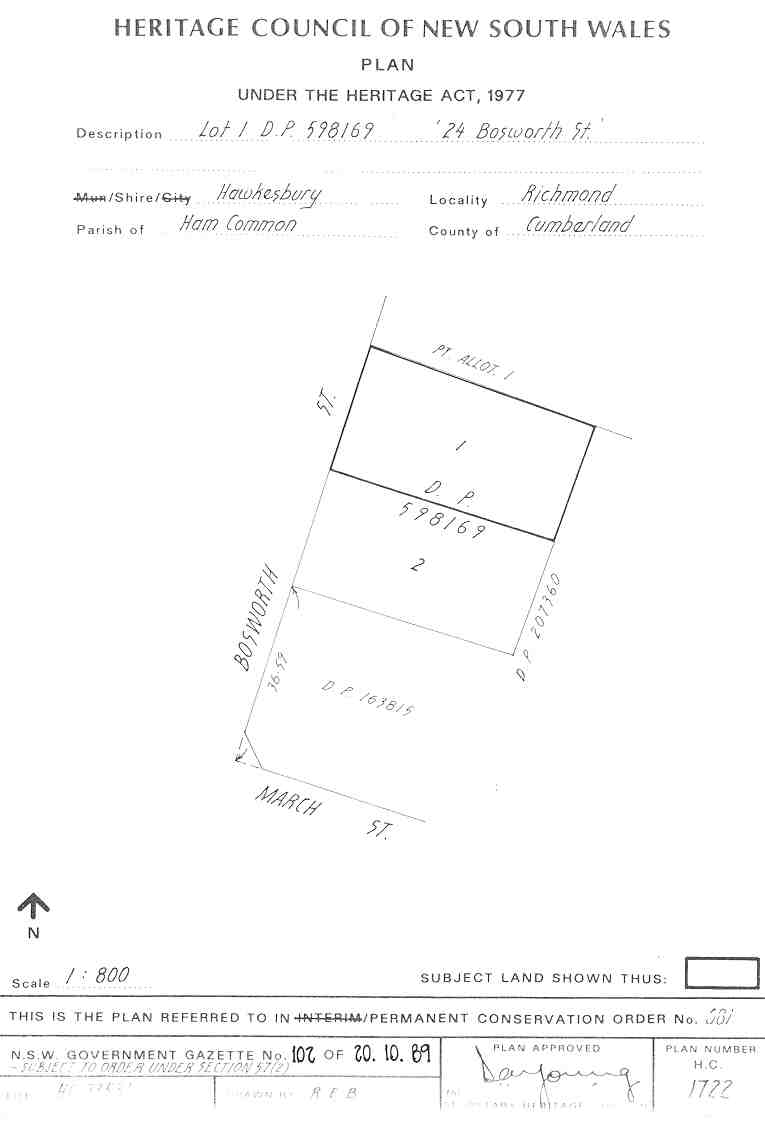
Heritage boundaries

Seymours House was listed on the New South Wales State Heritage Register on 2 April 1999.
