= Richmond Post Office =

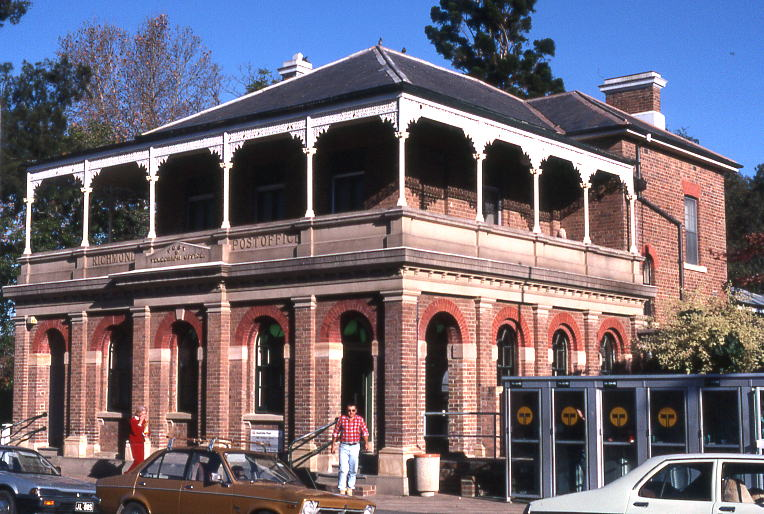

- Location within New South Wales Location within Australia
- 33.5971°S 150.7507°E
- Location: 286 Windsor Street, Richmond, City of Hawkesbury, New South Wales, Australia

History
- Built: 1875–1888

Site notes
- Architect: Colonial Architect James Baronet.
- Owner: Basscave Pty Ltd

New South Wales Heritage Register
- Official name: Richmond Post Office; Richmond Telegraph and Post Office
- Type: state heritage (built)
- Designated: 23 June 2000
- Reference no.: 1410
- Type: Post Office
- Category: Postal and Telecommunications
- Builders: Original building: 1875, Mr. Johnson. Second-story addition: 1888, Samuel Bought

Richmond Post Office is a heritage-listed former post office at 286 Windsor Street, Richmond, City of Hawkesbury, New South Wales, Australia. It was designed by Colonial Architect James Barnet and built from 1875 to 1888. The original building was built by a Mr. Johnson, with the second-story addition in 1888 added by Samuel Bought. It is also known as Richmond Telegraph and Post Office. It was added to the New South Wales State Heritage Register on 23 June 2000.

== History ==
The lower Hawkesbury was home to the Dharug people. The proximity to the Nepean River and South Creek qualifies it as a key area for food resources for indigenous groups. The Dharug and Darkinjung people called the river Deerubbin and it was a vital source of food and transport.

Governor Arthur Phillip explored the local area in search of suitable agricultural land in 1789 and discovered and named the Hawkesbury River after Baron Hawkesbury. This region played a significant role in the early development of the colony with European settlers established here by 1794. Situated on fertile floodplains and well known for its abundant agriculture, Green Hills (as it was originally called) supported the colony through desperate times. However, frequent flooding meant that the farmers along the riverbanks were often ruined.

Governor Lachlan Macquarie replaced Governor Bligh, taking up duty on 1 January 1810. Under his influence the colony prospered. His vision was for a free community, working in conjunction with the penal colony. He implemented an unrivalled public works program, completing 265 public buildings, establishing new public amenities and improving existing services such as roads. Under his leadership Hawkesbury district thrived. He visited the district on his first tour and recorded in his journal on 6/12/1810: "After dinner I chrestened the new townships...I gave the name of Windsor to the town intended to be erected in the district of the Green Hills...the township in the Richmond district I have named Richmond..." the district reminded Macquarie of those towns in England, whilst Castlereagh, Pitt Town and Wilberforce were named after English statesmen. These are often referred to as Macquarie's Five Towns. Their localities, chiefly Windsor and Richmond, became more permanent with streets, town square and public buildings.

With the Hawkesbury area being notoriously flood prone, the five towns were established to provide security and accommodation to those settlers whose farms were exposed to flooding from the Nepean, Hawkesbury and Georges Rivers, and to act as depots for shipments of grain and produce to and from the district. Richmond became a focal point in the region as an important market town and social centre. Between 1819 and 1857 the region remained flood free and experienced a peak in prosperity, with the town growing steadily as a result. During this time the Hawkesbury region provided a substantial part of the agricultural supplies to the colony.

Despite the decline of the farming communities in the later Victorian period, Richmond remained an important service centre within the region, and continued to grow into the twentieth century.

Mail was delivered to Richmond three times per week from 1830 where the local constable would deliver it on a voluntary basis. The first post office was officially established in Richmond in 1844, with a telegraph office later operating out of the railway station.

In c. 1870, the residents of Richmond petitioned for a new post office to be built. The new office, designed by Colonial Architect James Barnet, was opened in October 1875. Originally a one-storey office costing £1,479, the colonnade around the building was added in 1879, with stables and other additions constructed in 1882. The original form of the ground floor suggests that part of this space was initially used as a residence for the postmaster. A second storey was added soon after to provide additional residential space, being completed in August 1888 at a cost of £869.

The Georgian Revival style infill of the ground floor colonnade was constructed in 1906.

Australia Post vacated the building and moved to a shopfront across the road in 1998–99.

== Description ==
Richmond Post Office is a two-story English bond, Victorian Italianate building of struck trowelled clinker brick, with a hipped slate roof to the main building and lead ridge capping. The roof is punctuated by two double brick and render chimneys to the southwestern side, and a single brick and render chimney to the centre southeastern side of the main building.

Attached to the rear of the building are two single-storey brick additions with hipped corrugated steel roofs. They extend over a former service wing to the northwest side and later toilet facilities to the southeast side. The additions appear to have occurred in two stages, the northwest section being extended later under a separate corrugated steel hipped roof, with a much later brick and fibre cement sheet shed attachment to the end. The two lots of additions are separated by a covered walkway at centre, supported by timber posts, with a later concrete floor.

There is a first floor corrugated steel roofed verandah that wraps around the front facade and halfway down both sides, supported by green painted decorative cast iron posts, with lace brackets and valance. The posts rest on the upper floor verandah balustrade, formed by the rendered and cream painted entablature with dentil detailing, to the ground floor colonnade. The balustrade coping is rendered and painted a light brown colour.

The arches have white tuck pointed, rubbed red brick detailing, matching the rubbed red brick flat arches to the openings of the rear buildings and upper floor.

Richmond Post Office is substantially intact and retains the features which make it culturally significant, including architectural details such as the arcaded loggia, distinctive use of freestone, bi-chrome brickwork and cast iron lace, along with its overall scale, form and style.

=== Modifications and dates ===
- Addition of upper floor and balustrade in 1888
- Georgian Revival style infill of the ground floor colonnade in 1906.
- Australia Post relocation and subsequent fitout removal in 1998–99

The building is currently undergoing a top to toe heritage restoration with local builders and heritage specialists after being purchased in 2020.

== Heritage listing ==
Richmond Post Office is significant at a State level for its historical associations, strong aesthetic qualities and social value.

Richmond Post Office is historically significant because it is associated with the NSW Colonial Architect's Office under James Barnet, and is part of an important group of works by Barnet, a key practitioner of the Victorian Italianate architectural style in NSW. Richmond Post Office is also associated with the development of Richmond as an important service area in the Hawkesbury region, and the development of communications services in the Richmond area.

Richmond Post Office is aesthetically significant because it is a fine example of the Victorian Italianate architectural style, with strong visual appeal. It is located on a prominent corner site and, along with the neighbouring courthouse, makes a significant contribution to the streetscape of the Richmond civic precinct.

Richmond Post Office is also considered to be significant to the community of Richmond's sense of place.

Richmond Post Office was listed on the New South Wales State Heritage Register on 23 June 2000 having satisfied the following criteria.

The place is important in demonstrating the course, or pattern, of cultural or natural history in New South Wales.

Richmond Post Office is associated with the development of the town of Richmond, one of the five "Macquarie Towns" and historically an important service provider to the Hawkesbury region.

Richmond Post Office is also associated with the historical development of communications services to the Richmond area. The stables and second-storey addition also provide important evidence of the changing nature of communication services.

Richmond Post Office is associated with the Colonial Architect's Office under James Barnet, which designed and maintained a number of post offices in NSW between 1865 and 1890. James Barnet is a key practitioner of the Victorian Italianate architectural style in NSW.

The place is important in demonstrating aesthetic characteristics and/or a high degree of creative or technical achievement in New South Wales.

Richmond Post Office is a distinctive example of the Victorian Italianate style of architecture. The design and location of the building also make it a focal point of the civic precinct of Richmond, endowing it with landmark qualities.

The Richmond Post Office is also stylistically compatible with the neighbouring courthouse, making an aesthetically significant contribution to the streetscape.

The place has strong or special association with a particular community or cultural group in New South Wales for social, cultural or spiritual reasons.

As a prominent civic building, Richmond Post Office is considered to be significant to the Richmond community's sense of place

The place has potential to yield information that will contribute to an understanding of the cultural or natural history of New South Wales.

The site of the Richmond Post Office has potential to contain archaeological information.

The place possesses uncommon, rare or endangered aspects of the cultural or natural history of New South Wales.

Richmond Post Office is a particularly fine example of the work of the Colonial Architect's Office under James Barnet.

The place is important in demonstrating the principal characteristics of a class of cultural or natural places/environments in New South Wales.

Richmond Post Office is a distinctive example of the Victorian Italianate architectural style. It is part of a group of nineteenth century post offices in NSW designed by the Colonial Architect's Office under James Barnet. Richmond Post Office compares with post offices in Wellington (Wellington Post Office) (1869), Tumut (Tumut Post Office) (1870), Parkes (Parkes Post Office) (1880), and other nineteenth century post offices having ground floor arcades with upper level verandahs.
