= New Inn, Richmond =

New Inn
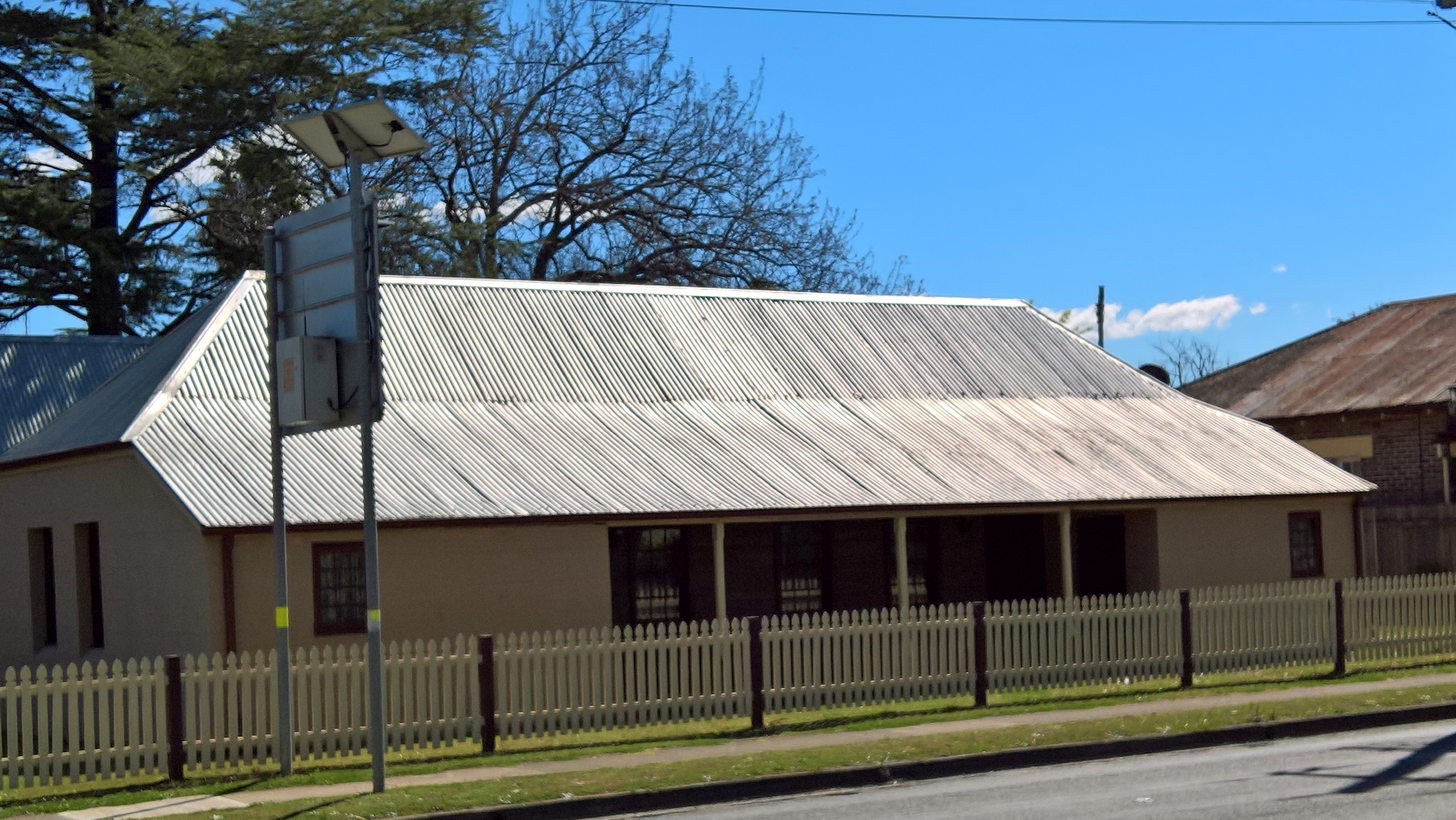
- New Inn, 49-51 Bosworth Street, Richmond NSW

- Location within Sydney Location within Australia
- 33°35′51″S 150°44′46″E
- Location: 49 - 51 Bosworth Street, Richmond, City of Hawkesbury, New South Wales, Australia

History
- Built: 1827–1927

New South Wales Heritage Register
- Official name: Building, outbuildings, grounds, trees
- Type: State heritage (complex / group)
- Designated: 2 April 1999
- Reference no.: 753
- Type: Other - Residential Buildings (private)
- Category: Residential buildings (private)

The New Inn is a heritage-listed former inn and now residence located at 49 - 51 Bosworth Street, Richmond, City of Hawkesbury, New South Wales, Australia. It was built from 1827 to 1927. It was added to the New South Wales State Heritage Register on 2 April 1999.

== History ==
The earliest plan layout of this building conforms to Governor Lachlan Macquarie's criteria for early housing in the Macquarie Towns (above the level of, and because of, the Hawkesbury River's irregular floods).

The building was built in a number of stages. The date of initial construction is unknown. Initially a four-room structure with a front verandah, it was expanded in the 1830s to include an additional three rooms to the south and a rear kitchen.

It was licensed as the "New Inn" under Robert Potts from 1837 until 1839. It later operated as a store and private residence.

It was saved from demolition in the 1980s, and incorporated into a motel development, the "New Inn Motel" in 1995. It now serves as a manager's residence for the motel at the rear of the property.

== Description ==
Early nineteenth century building now used as motel manager's residence;

== Heritage listing ==
49-51 Bosworth Street is an intact example of the more substantial town buildings erected in Richmond, New South Wales during the prosperous 1830s. It represents the style of building construction more substantial than the crude dwellings initially erected in the town. It has a strong association with a local entrepreneur, Isaac Cornwell, who was representative of the moderately successful second-generation, native-born colonist.

It demonstrates the characteristic style of town buildings, construction techniques and building materials of house building in the 1830s-1840s.

It is an example of utilising brick nog construction techniques of which only a small number (of known examples) remain today.

It offers a valuable and meaningful comparison to Bowman's Cottage demonstrating both the evolution and continuation of building styles, techniques and materials.

The site of the houses may possess archaeological potential.

New Inn was listed on the New South Wales State Heritage Register on 2 April 1999.

== See also ==
- Pubs in Australia
