= Hobartville, New South Wales =

Hobartville
- Suburb
- Interactive map of Hobartville
- Country: Australia
- State: New South Wales
- City: Sydney
- LGA: City of Hawkesbury
- Location: 63.5 km (39.5 mi) from Sydney CBD

Government
  - State electorate: Hawkesbury
  - Federal division: Macquarie
- Elevation: 20 m (66 ft)

Population
  - Total: 2,712 (2021 census)
- Postcode: 2753
Suburbs around Hobartville
Richmond	Richmond	Richmond
Richmond	Hobartville	Richmond
Richmond	Richmond	Richmond

Hobartville is a suburb of Richmond, in the state of New South Wales, Australia.

Hobartville was originally a horse stud and was subdivided in the 1960s with the first houses built in 1969. Hobartville Public School was opened in 1971 and the Hobartville Shopping Centre was opened in 1978.

== Population ==
At the 2021 census, there were 2,712 residents in Hobartville. 81.6% of people were born in Australia and the most common ancestries were English, Australian, and Irish. The top responses for religious affiliation were No Religion 37.6%, Catholic 19.0% and Anglican 18.4%. Almost all dwellings were detached houses and most of these had 3 or more bedrooms. The median monthly mortgage payment was $2,141 which was higher than the national figure of $1,863.
