= Clarendon, New South Wales =

Clarendon
- Suburb
- Interactive map of Clarendon
- Coordinates: 33°36′42″S 150°47′13″E
- Country: Australia
- State: New South Wales
- LGA: City of Hawkesbury
- Location: 57 km (35 mi) north-west of Sydney CBD

Government
  - State electorate: Hawkesbury
  - Federal division: Macquarie
- Elevation: 16 m (52 ft)

Population
  - Total: 147 (2021 census)
- Postcode: 2756
Suburbs around Clarendon
Richmond	Cornwallis	Cornwallis
Richmond	Clarendon	Windsor
Richmond	South Windsor	South Windsor

Clarendon is a suburb of Sydney, in the state of New South Wales, Australia. Clarendon lies between historic towns of Windsor and Richmond.

Clarendon railway station is on the Richmond branch.

It is also home to Hawkesbury Racecourse and the Hawkesbury Show Ground.

It borders the RAAF Base Richmond, a Royal Australian Air Force base at Richmond which was established in 1923. The air base is currently the home to the RAAF's transport squadrons. During the Vietnam War logistic support and medical evacuations were supplied by the Hercules from RAAF Richmond.
