= Darkinjung Local Aboriginal Land Council =

Aboriginal people of New South Wales

Coordinates: 33.26°S 151.34°E

The Darkinjung (not to be confused with the Darkinyung people further inland) are the Local Aboriginal Land Council in the Central Coast, New South Wales, area of Australia and a major landowner on the Central Coast, participating in formal joint management of some areas of state forest in the region. It represents over 450 local Aboriginal residents. The Darkinjung Local Aboriginal Land Council are self-appointed caretakers of the Central Coast of NSW Australia. They do not claim to be the traditional owners of the area in which they reside.

The Darkinjung people are believed to have died out in the late 19th century due to the effects of disease and dispossession. Darkinjung Aboriginal Land Council represents the interests of the Aboriginal residents of the Darkinjung lands, but those Aboriginal residents come from other Aboriginal groups.

== Property development ==
The majority of the expenditure undertaken by the Darkinjung Land Council is on land and property development. In the 2012–13 financial year, $2.2 million was incurred on capital acquisition. A further $824,000 was spent on land and civil construction. This represents more than half of the annual income, which in 2012–13 was $5.5 million. In 2013–14, out of annual income of $3.6 million, $1.97 million was spent on land & construction. A further sum was spent on consultants related to the land development. No funds were allocated to education.

== See also ==
- Kuringgai
