= List of the oldest buildings in Australia =

This article lists the oldest known surviving buildings constructed in Australia.

== 17th century ==
Building	Image	Location	State	First built	Use	Notes
Wiebbe Hayes Stone Fort		West Wallabi Island	Western Australia	1629	Stone Fort	Wiebbe Hayes built the fort to defend himself against a dangerous mutineers from the shipwrecked crew. It is a basic four walled building, with no roof, and an opening. The Mutineers attacked the fort three times, but were driven off and eventually subdued. The Remnants of the fort are still on site, located on the West Wallabi island, 60 km off the coast of WA. It is the oldest European construction in Australia It is not currently used for defensive purposes, or inhabited, and has minimal facilities. The site, along with other remains of the Batavia crew's temporary habitation of the area, was first surveyed in 1963 Pre dated first European settlement on the east coast of Australia by 150 years

== 18th century ==
Building	Image	Location	State	First built	Use	Notes
Elizabeth Farm		Rosehill	New South Wales	1793	Residential	The oldest surviving European dwelling in Australia. It is currently a living museum, where the public can access all areas, and it is represented in authentic period style as it would have been at the time of its original use
Addington House		Ryde	New South Wales	Sometime between 1794 and 1810	Residential	The original sandstone cottage consisting of 3 rooms was built sometime between 1794 and 1810. In 1810, the house was rebuilt around the original cottage, now with a total of 6 rooms. The west wing was added in 1822 and the east wing in 1840.
Experiment Farm Cottage		Harris Park	New South Wales	1795	Residential	Australia's first European farmstead, constructed under the guidance of Governor Arthur Phillip. A farm that advocated experimental agricultural techniques, but largely fulfilling a wish by Governor Phillip to determine, via experimentation, the period required in which a settler could become self-supporting. The building was constructed by Surgeon John Harris, who had bought the land from Ruse in 1793 for £40. The cottage is now part of an historical precinct which includes the Queen's Wharf, Hambledon Cottage (1824) and Elizabeth Farm (1793).
Dairy Cottage		Parramatta	New South Wales	1798	Residential	
Old Government House		Parramatta	New South Wales	1799	Administrative	Taking over 20 years to build, it was the administrative stronghold of the colonial government. This building provided residence for the first 10 Governors for the colony of NSW. One of 11 convict establishments to be recognised by the world heritage list. Oldest surviving Government residence Replaced the previous Government house which was subject to crime and disease due to its placement in Sydney.

== 19th century ==
Building	Image	Location	State	First built	Use	Notes
The Hermitage		Castle Hill	New South Wales	1802	Residential	Historians believe it may be Sydney's oldest surviving slab hut, surviving for so long as it was built of the termite-resistant turpentine timber cut on the property, as well as the fact that it is surrounded by a later house. Possibly also the oldest surviving privately owned building in Australia and the oldest of any kind in the Hills District.
Vaucluse House		Vaucluse	New South Wales	1803	Residential	Originally built as a small cottage in 1803 but now features later additions.
Hadley Park		Castlereagh	New South Wales	1803	Residential	The property's original single storey cottage is still extant and said to be built in 1803.
543-547 Glenmore Road		Edgecliff	New South Wales	c. 1803	Residential	Row of three circa 1803 worker's cottages built of sandstock brick.
470 Cawdor Road		Cawdor	New South Wales	1803-04	Residential	Slab hut.
Joyce Farmhouse		Baulkham Hills	New South Wales	1794-1804	Residential	Originally built in 1794 rebuilt after fire in 1804.
Mountain View		Richmond	New South Wales	c. 1804	Residential	The original two-roomed cottage built of sandstock brick was constructed c.1804, and is possibly the oldest building in the Hawkesbury region.
Macquarie Retreat		Cattai	New South Wales	1805	Residential	Original stone house built in 1805 but now features later additions.
Macquarie Arms Inn Cottage		Pitt Town	New South Wales	c.1805	Residential	The site consists of four buildings; the main house/inn, a separate kitchen, stables/barn, and a c.1805 brick cottage.
Claremont Cottage		Windsor	New South Wales	1807	Residential	
Hope and Anchor Hotel		Hobart	Tasmania	1807	Public house	Australia's oldest public house, established in 1807. Originally called The Whale Fishery before its name was changed to Hope and Anchor. Possibly the oldest surviving building in Tasmania.
Clear Oaks		Richmond	New South Wales	1809	Residential	
Goldfinders Inn Cottage		Kurrajong	New South Wales	1809	Residential	The timber cottage on the site may have been built from as early as 1809 with the sandstone inn built sometime in the following decades.
Ebenezer Church		Ebenezer	New South Wales	1809	Religious	The oldest surviving church building in Australia.
Commissariat Store		Hobart	Tasmania	1808-1810	Commercial	
Rose Cottage and Early Slab Hut		Werrington	New South Wales	1810	Residential	The timber slab hut is believed to have been built around the turn of the 18th century.
Fleurs		Kemps Creek	New South Wales	c. 1810	Residential	Originally known as "Bayly Park", and changed to "Fleurs" in the 1830s.
Collingwood		Liverpool	New South Wales	c.1810	Residential	House built c.1810 on estate granted to Eber Bunker between 1804 and 1810.
Campania House		Campania	Tasmania	1810-13	Residential	Possibly Australia's oldest home to be continuously occupied.
Montrose		Montrose	Tasmania	1813	Residential	Built in 1813, the home is Tasmania's 3rd oldest and the suburb takes its name.
Rose Cottage		Wilberforce	New South Wales	1810-1820	Residential	Built in either 1810s or 1820s.
Ingle Hall		Hobart	Tasmania	1814	Residential	
The Bush Inn		New Norfolk	Tasmania	1815	Public house	Australia's longest continuously licensed public house, established originally in 1815. It was originally used as a tavern, and also as a church. The site includes underground tunnels, which still exist under the pub, but are currently blocked.
Cadmans Cottage		The Rocks	New South Wales	1816	Boat crew residence (for Governor's personal boat)	The cottage was originally built to house the Governor's 52 personal sailors, who could not all fit in his residence. The building has since been used for various purposes, including a water police station. It was named after popular carouser, former convict, taverner and the Fourth Government Coxswain John Cadman, The cottage was originally built at the water's edge, it is now 100 meters back as the waterline has changed.
Collits' Inn		Hartley Vale	New South Wales	1823	Inn	Known as the Golden Fleece when it opened in 1823, the Inn provided an important rest stop for travelers descending Mt York on Cox's Rd the original road to Bathurst and is famous for hosting several colonial Govenors.
Round House		Fremantle	Western Australia	1830	Prison	Oldest building in mainland WA. Constructed in 1830 by Henry W. Reveley Used as a jail from 1831-1900. A whaling tunnel was construction beneath the Round House in 1838.
Old Court House		Perth	Western Australia	1836	Judicial	Oldest building in Perth. Constructed in 1836 by Henry W. Reveley. Used as a courthouse, schoolroom, and place of worship until 1974
Ashford House		Adelaide	South Australia	1838	Residential	Likely oldest building in Adelaide
Friends Meeting House, Adelaide		Adelaide	South Australia	1840	Religious	Likely oldest religious building in Adelaide. Likely oldest wooden building in Adelaide. Oldest Quaker building in Australia.
Trinity Church Adelaide		Adelaide	South Australia	1845	Religious	Church founded 1836. Foundation stone for current stone building first laid in 1838. Other details between 1838 and 1845 "rebuild" unclear.
