= Robert Littlejohn =

Robert Littlejohn may refer to:

- Robert Littlejohn (gardener) (1756–1818), Scottish gardener, amateur naturalist and artist who settled in what is now Tasmania, Australia
- Robert Grayson Littlejohn, American physicist
- Robert McGowan Littlejohn (1890–1982), American military officer
