= Atalanta Ltd =

Engineering company (1921–1937)

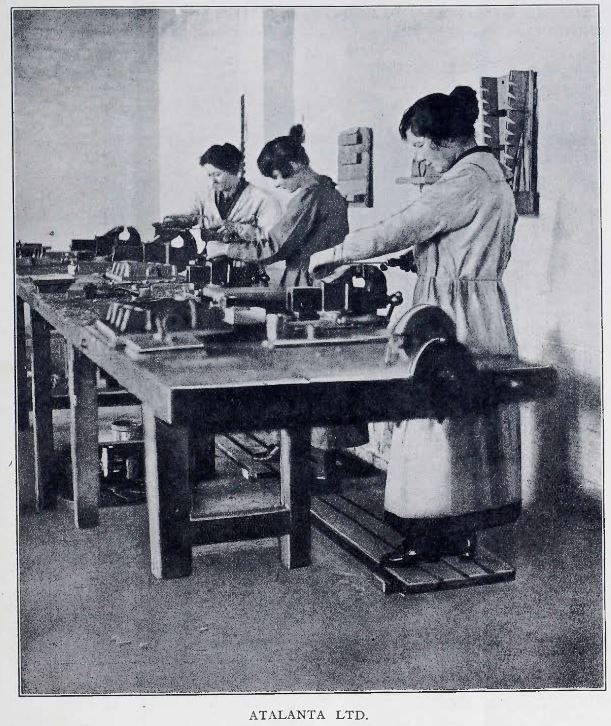
- Industry: engineering
- Founded: 1921; 105 years ago
- Defunct: 1937; 89 years ago
- Headquarters: Loughborough, then London
- Key people: Lady Katherine Parsons; Lady Eleanor Shelly-Rolls; Annette Ashberry; Rachel Parsons; Caroline Haslett; Dora Turner; Herbert Schofield
- Products: oil burners; surface plates; drilling jigs;adjustable spanners; screwdrivers
- Services: engineering training for women

Named after Atalanta the heroine from Greek mythology Atalanta Ltd (1921–1937) was an engineering company set up in 1921 in the UK by a small group of women engineers. It was considered notable at the time for providing employment specifically for women engineers, who were barred from many engineering works and apprenticeships.

== Founding ==
Dora Turner and Annette Ashberry, who were working for Galloway Engineering at their Tongland Works, decided to set up a company that would allow women to gain experience in engineering. They then approached the founders of the Women's Engineering Society for support and financial backing.

There were eight people involved in foundation of the company. The company's chair was Lady Katherine Parsons, who was also one of the principal shareholders along with Lady Eleanor Shelly-Rolls. Annette Ashberry was a director, along with Rachel Parsons, Caroline Haslett, Dora Turner, and Herbert Schofield, the head of Loughborough College of Technology.

== Manufacturing ==
The first headquarters of the organisation consisted of three walls and a mud floor, and was occupied by pigs and chickens. The founders completed the building work to make the space habitable, including a concrete floor, lathes and a gas supply. They manufactured oil burners and surface plates. In 1922, the company moved to London and added adjustable spanners, screwdrivers and drilling jigs to their list of manufactured products.

== Social goals ==
The objective of the company was to provide careers for women who had been employed in engineering during the First World War and were made redundant at the war's end, often as a result of the Restoration of Pre-War Practices Act 1919, which forced women to give up their posts in favour of returning servicemen unless they had been working in the same role before the war. It also aimed to provide further training, initially at Loughborough College of Technology, where both Ashberry and Turner were studying.

In the 1920s, publications such as The Engineer, Flight international, Practical Engineer, and Engineers' Gazette published articles about the company, remarking on its novel social mission to employ women. The organisation also featured in feminist papers and in the Woman Engineer journal. The Woman Engineer explained that the company had been founded by women who 'seeing no scope for their activities, and having the natural road of success barred to them... decided to risk their all and to establish an engineering works where there will be absolute freedom for them to use the ability and skill which they possess.'

== Legacy ==
The company ceased manufacturing in 1928. According to historian Carroll Pursell, it ended in 'failure and recriminations' but inspired other organisations including the Electrical Enterprise, Ltd., and the Electrical Association for Women. Atalanta still exhibited in 1929 and 1931 at The Shipping, Engineering and Machinery Exhibition at Olympia.

It was removed from listed companies in 1937.

It is not related to the company Atalanta Ltd founded in 2008, or the social enterprise Atalanta, incorporated in 2017.
