= Ingleby Farms & Forests =

Multinational farming company

- Trade name: Ingleby Farms & Forests
- Type: Private
- Industry: Agriculture
- Area served: Worldwide
- Key people: Carl-Gustaf Wachtmeister (Chairman)
- Owner: Rausing family
- Website: inglebyfarms.com

Ingleby Farms & Forests is a multi-national agricultural corporation, with a head office in Køge in Denmark. It is owned by the wealthy Swedish Rausing family; in 2021 the owners were reported to be Lisbet Rausing and Benjamin Henry Anders Rausing Koerner. It owns significant farming interests in New Zealand, Romania, Argentina, Latvia, Lithuania, the United States, Australia and Perú.

== Australia ==
Ingleby operates under a variety of subsidiaries in Australia. In Tasmania it uses the name Clovelly Tasmania Pty Ltd. Ingleby owns around 16,000 hectares (40,000 acres) in Australia, including many historic Tasmanian properties. In 2005 it purchased the 1838 property Bowood for AUD$7.75 million and in 2011 purchased the 1839 Georgian Symmons Plains Estate from the Youl family for AUD$10 million.

== New Zealand ==
The company operates as Ingleby Company Ltd in New Zealand. It has purchased 17 farming properties, of which it later sold one, merged two and sold part of another. They received heavy criticism for allegedly overpaying for properties to cut locals out of the market, particularly in their NZ$4.2 million purchase of Katoa Station, Gisborne District, in 2007. They own an estimated 20,000 hectares (49,000 acres) in New Zealand. It is the largest foreigner owner of pastoral land in New Zealand.

== Romania ==
Ingleby Agricultura is its subsidiary in Romania. It owns around 11,000 hectares (27,000 acres), making it the largest single land owner in the country.
