= Annette Ashberry =

Engineer, gardener and author, first woman elected to the Society of Engineers

- Born: Hannah Annenberg; 9 March 1894; Hackney, London, England
- Died: 2 September 1990 (aged 96); Chelmsford, Essex, England
- Other name: Anne Ashberry
- Occupations: Engineer, gardener and author

Annette Ashberry (9 March 1894 – 2 September 1990), also known as Anne Ashberry, was a British engineer, gardener and author, and the first woman elected to the Society of Engineers.

== Early life ==
Annette Ashberry was born in Hackney on 9 March 1894 to Israel and Leah Annenberg, part of a large Jewish immigrant family from Russia. She had six brothers and five sisters. Her father changed their surname from Annenberg to Ashberry in response to the anti-German sentiment which built ahead of the First World War.

== Engineering career ==
Like many women, Ashberry worked on munitions during the First World War. She began her career in engineering in 1916, inspecting fuses in a factory. She had a keen interest in engineering which led to her working for British Thomson-Houston dealing with magnetos.

Ashberry joined the Galloway Engineering Company's (mainly female staffed) Tongland factory near Kirkcudbright and became the Secretary of the Tongland Branch of the Women's Engineering Society (WES), which was formed in 1919 following a visit of the first WES secretary Caroline Haslett. Ashberry and fellow Galloway Engineering Company engineer Dora Turner wrote about their views of the future of women in engineering, including the question "Would it not be possible for other firms to build and equip factories especially for women labour?".

The end of hostilities brought a slowdown in her career opportunities, and Ashberry began studying for a BSc in engineering at Loughborough Technical College.

The newly formed Women's Engineering Society then encouraged her to open an engineering factory which focused on employing women. In 1920, Ashberry founded Atalanta Ltd in Loughborough, along with Rachel Parsons, Caroline Haslett, Lady Eleanor Shelley-Rolls, Dora Turner, and Herbert Schofield, the head of Loughborough Technical College.

After installing power to their basic premises, the women produced hand scraped surface plates and oil burners. After facing problems securing payments from customers, they reduced staff to just Annette and one other woman, and moved premises to London in hope of establishing business contacts there. In 1922, they moved to Brixton, London, and started to see successes. The same year Ashberry won a prize from the Women's Engineering Society for the design of a dishwasher and obtained her first patent for a vegetable peeler.

In 1925, Ashberry was the first woman to be elected to the Society of Engineers and delivered the first address by a woman to the Society's members on 1 November 1926.

== Gardening career ==
By 1937, Ashberry had closed Atalanta Ltd. for business and moved into an entirely different field of work: miniature gardens. She started a business in Kensington producing landscapes in ordinary window boxes which she sold to elderly and disabled gardeners and those living in flats.

The Second World War brought a necessary return to engineering for Ashberry, but in 1945 she was able to purchase a cottage in Chignall Smealy and resume her miniature gardening business. In this field she was better known as Anne Ashberry and became famous for her nursery and designs. She exhibited at Chelsea Flower Shows, The Festival of Britain Exhibition and on television. She published 7 books, starting with Miniature Gardens in 1951. A film about miniature gardens featuring Ashberry was made by British Pathé in 1952. Other notable books included Bottled Garden and Fern Cases (1964) and Alpine Lawns (1966).

Ashberry died in Chelmsford, Essex on 2 September 1990, aged 96.
