= Western Line, Tasmania =

Railway line in Tasmania

Western Line

Overview
- Owner: TasRail
- Termini: Bell Bay Line; Wiltshire

Service
- Type: Heavy rail
- Operator(s): TasRail

History
- Opened: 1871

Technical
- Line length: 223 km (139 mi)
- Track gauge: 3 ft 6 in (1,067 mm)
- Old gauge: 5 ft 3 in (1,600 mm)

The Western Line, previously known as the Launceston and Western Line, is a 223 km freight rail corridor that runs from Western Junction to Wiltshire in Tasmania, Australia.

== Description ==
The original line was built in 1871 as a private 5 ft 3 in (1,600 mm) broad gauge railway that opened between Deloraine and Launceston to ship agricultural products to port for Victorian markets. In 1872, following takeover of the Launceston & Western Railway Company by the Tasmanian Government Railways, the line was made dual gauge with 3 ft 6 in (1,067 mm) gauge to standardise the Tasmanian rail network. The last broad gauge trains ran, and the outer rail was lifted in 1885.

The line still traverses its original survey. It was modified to bypass Latrobe in the 1980s, and new bridges have meant slight variations to its corridor.

== Operations ==
The line once had a large number of stopping stations and sidings, used when passenger and common goods services were operated by the Tasmanian Government Railways. Nowadays, the line operates direct between Western Junction and Burnie with some stable and passing loops. Old platforms and lineside infrastructure remain extant in some towns.

== Infrastructure ==
The line has many significant bridges, viaducts and crossings, as it makes its way over the South Esk and Mersey Rivers. At Western Junction, a major level crossing controls traffic on B41 Evandale Road. The old platform from when passenger operations used Western Junction remains, as well as a platform building and temporary office. An old water tower also exists.

The Hunter's Mill viaduct is situated between Western Junction and Perth, where the line crosses the Main Road which previously formed part of the Midland Highway, before the town was bypassed in 2018. The level crossing has 24 hour video surveillance to detect vehicles breaching the crossing.

At Longford, the railway bridge and viaduct are both important engineering milestones, and in the 1960s the line once famously intersected with the town's motor racing circuit, with race cars jumping the level crossing, and weaving beneath the viaduct. The town's old passenger platform exists in disrepair, while an historic semaphore signal remains at the crossing.

Several cuttings and underpasses allow the line to bisect the Bass Highway, and sidings remains at Westbury and Deloraine, where a passing loop and coloured signals allow for traffic to wait at the river crossing. Immediately as it enters the Deloraine township, a major level crossing exists at a roundabout. Continuing on, a junction previously existed at Lemana with the Mole Creek branch, and a disused siding remains at Dunorlan.

At Railton, the former passenger platform still remains, having been turned into a public park. A major marshalling yard exists at Railton to shunt cement trains from the nearby Cement Australia plant, where a newer platform with building are also located for crew.

The line continues towards Devonport on embankments, with little other infrastructure remaining. The line formerly deviated into Latrobe, crossing the Mersey at two separate points. With exception from old level crossing gates, two old semaphore signals at a local bowling club and a shopping area named "Station Square", no remains exist of the former line in Latrobe. The old corridor has now formed part of a memorial park to local war hero Teddy Sheean.

== See also ==
- Rail transport in Tasmania
