= Star Theatre, Invermay =

Star Theatre
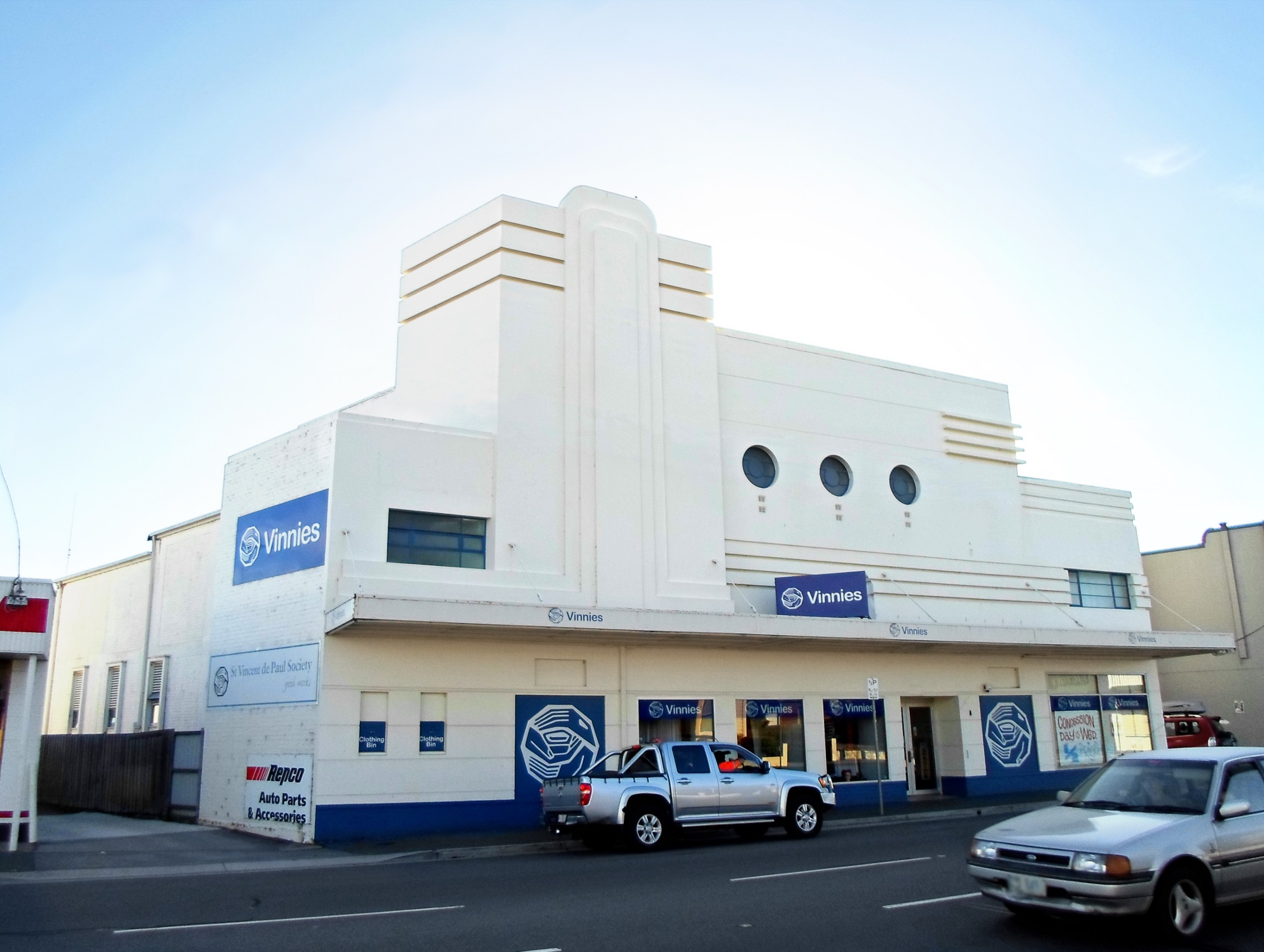
- The Star Theatre when it housed the St. Vincent de Paul Society
- Interactive map of the Star Theatre area

General information
- Architectural style: Art Deco, Streamline Moderne
- Location: 217B Invermay Road, Invermay, Tasmania, Australia
- Coordinates: 41.4182°S 147.1342°E
- Opened: 5 October 1937; 88 years ago
- Owner: Michael Smith

Other information
- Seating capacity: 250

Website
- Official site

Tasmanian Heritage Register
- Place ID: 4,412
- Status: Permanently Registered

The Star Theatre is a historic Streamline Modern/Art Deco theatre in the inner Launceston suburb of Invermay, Tasmania. When it opened in 1937, the theatre provided seating for 852 persons. The cinema was purchased in 1971 by the St. Vincent de Paul Society as a charity store after the theatre originally closed in 1969.

Andrew Quaile, Ben Davis and Paul Lee-Archer purchased the property in 2015, restoring it to an independent cinema, café and bar. The cinema re-opened on 6 April 2018. In 2022, it was purchased by Michael Smith, proprietor of the Sun Theatre in Yarraville, Victoria, Australia.
