= Launceston College, Tasmania =

Launceston College
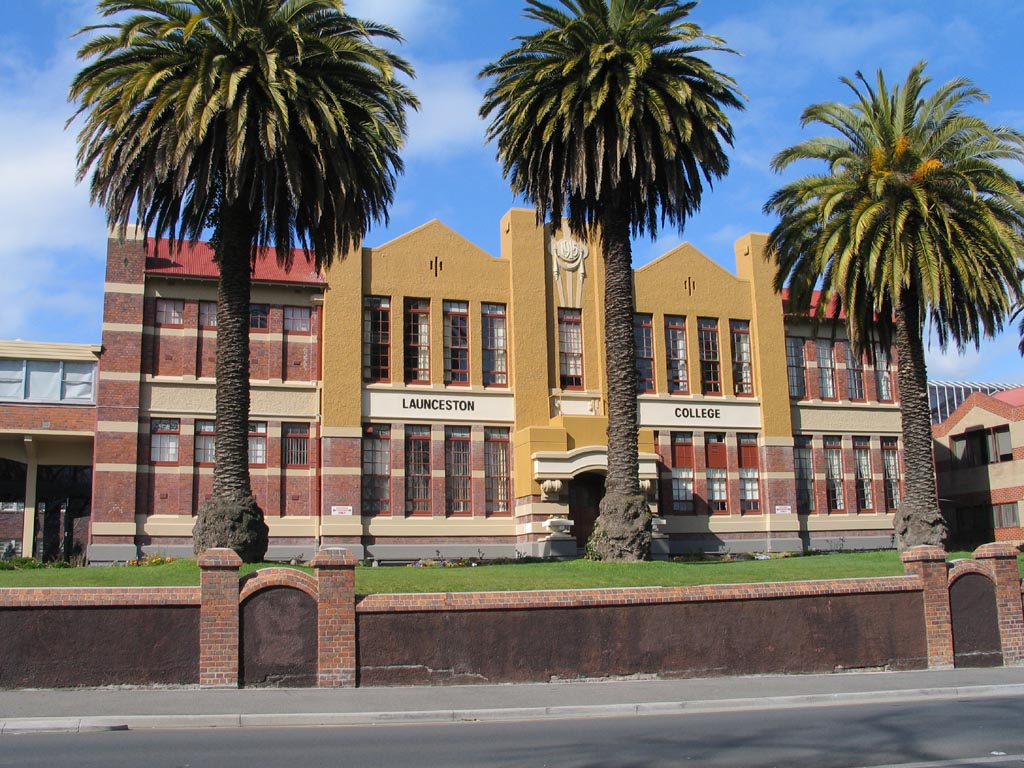
- Launceston College main entrance

Location
- 107–119 Paterson Street; Launceston, Tasmania; Australia; 41°26′23″S 147°07′58″E

Information
- Type: Government comprehensive senior college
- Established: 1913; 113 years ago as Launceston State High School
- Status: Open
- School district: Northern
- Educational authority: Department for Education, Children and Young People
- Oversight: Office of Tasmanian Assessment, Standards & Certification
- Principal: Vicki Mackrill
- Teaching staff: 96.4 FTE (2019)
- Years: 11–12; optional Year 13
- Enrolment: ~1,200 (2022)
- Campus type: Regional urban area
- Colours: Black and gold
- Website: launcestoncollege.education.tas.edu.au

Launceston College, Tasmania
- Interactive map of Launceston College, Tasmania

History
- Built: 1834

Tasmanian Heritage Register
- Official name: Launceston College and former Female Factory and Gaol, 107–119 Paterson Street, and part of Paterson Street, Launceston
- Reference no.: 11,010

Launceston College is a government comprehensive senior secondary school located in Launceston, Tasmania, Australia. Established in 1913 as the Launceston State High School and subsequently known as Launceston College, the college caters for approximately 1,200 students in Years 11 and 12, and an optional Year 13. The college is administered by the Department for Education, Children and Young People.

In 2019 student enrolments were 1,430. The college principal is Vicki Mackrill. The college has an International Student Program.

== Facilities ==
The college is located on a site that was the location of the former Launceston Female Factory and Gaol, built in 1834, and is listed on the Tasmanian Heritage Register.

Originally named Launceston State High School, the college became Launceston Matriculation College in 1967, and subsequently Launceston Community College to reflect its broader academic curriculum and vocational influence, and then Launceston College.

The campus stretches over two city blocks and incorporates a gymnasium complex including a swimming pool with sauna and spa, two basketball courts, rock climbing wall, full weights gym and squash courts. It has a commercial equipped training restaurant, an FM radio station, automotive workshop and television studio. The Launceston College on air radio station (LCFM) can be found on the FM frequency of 87.8 and is also streamed to the web.

== Co-curricular activities ==
The college also offers the yearly opportunity to students to be involved in stage productions. Since 2008, the college has presented Rent (Schools Edition), Grease, Flashdance, Matilda, In the Heights, Rock of Ages, Bring It On, Aida, the remake of Footloose, Hairspray, and Seussical. Earlier productions have been Chess, Mechanics of Love, Copacabana, Cinderocka, Jesus Christ Superstar, Footloose, Grease, Hair, High School Musical, All Shook Up, Disco Inferno, and Back To The 80s.

The school also offers overseas travel opportunities.

== Publications ==
The college has produced several publications since 1913, such as:

- The Northern Churinga (1914–1966)
- Churinga (1967–present)
- The history of the Launceston State High School, 1913–1966 and Launceston Matriculation College, 1967–1976
- Prospectus
- LC in ... : Orientation Guide
- 100 years of excellence: Launceston State High School to Launceston College 1913–2013

== Headmasters and principals ==
=== Launceston State High School ===
Tenure	Headmaster
1913–1928	Raymond Orlando Maurice Miller (R. O. M. Miller)
1929–1931	Harry Vernard Biggins
1932–1938	Archibald L. Meston (A. L. Meston)
1939–1952	William Carl Morris (W. C. Morris)
1953–1966	L. E. Amos

The High School's alumni include Dora Turner who had a school named after her.

=== Launceston Matriculation College ===
Tenure	Principal
1967	L. E. Amos
1968–1969	J. Woodruf
1970–1979	K. J. Walker

=== Launceson Community College ===
Tenure	Principal
1984–1986	Alf L. Crawford

=== Launceston College ===
Tenure	Principal
1987–1989	Alf L. Crawford
1990–1996	Col S. Lane
1997–2001	Graham Spreight
2002–2017	Keith Wenn
2018–present	Vicki Mackrill

== See also ==
- Australian Convict Sites
- Cascades Female Factory
- List of schools in Tasmania
- Education in Tasmania
