= Herbert Schofield =

Herbert Schofield CBE
- Born: Herbert Schofield; 8 December 1882; Halifax, Yorkshire, England
- Died: 18 September 1963 (aged 80); Radmoor Road, Loughborough, England
- Education: Schools in Halifax; apprenticeship in father's engineering company; Royal College of Science, London
- Occupations: Technical education and training
- Years active: 1912–1950
- Known for: Technical training of over 2,000 munitions workers in WWI; urging need for libraries for technical institutes; promoting the Rotary movement.
- Spouse: Clara (née Johns)

Herbert Schofield (8 December 1882 – 18 September 1963) was a leading figure in technical education, a Rotarian and, from 1915 to 1950, a Principal of Loughborough College, which became Loughborough University.

== Biography ==
Herbert Schofield was born in Halifax, the elder son of Alice (née Dawtry) and James Schofield who were married in 1880. James had his own general and textile engineering business in the town.

=== Education ===
Herbert’s education began at St James’ School, Halifax. Then, at age 10 he moved to Holy Trinity Higher Grade School. In 1896 he began a seven-year apprenticeship in his father’s company, gaining experience in fitting, turning and forging, and some drawing office work. Schofield continued for eight months or so in business with his father, as a textile engineer, before moving in July 1904 to Messrs G H Gledhill & Sons Ltd., a company noted for its automatic cash till and a variety of important wartime inventions. In 1905 Schofield gained a Carnegie engineering scholarship to the Royal College of Science, part of Imperial College of Science and Technology in South Kensington. Three years later he was awarded a BSc in Applied Mechanical Engineering (First Class Honours), and was first in 1st Class for the diploma of "Associate of the Royal College of Science" (mechanics and physics). That same year (1908) Schofield was appointed by the Governors of Imperial College to conduct research on the thermal efficiency of high speed internal combustion engines; he stayed for 4 years. He was awarded a PhD for this research in 1923.

=== Early career ===
In 1912, Schofield ("a distinguished physicist") became Senior Physics Master at Dover County School, and Principal of the Technical Institute at Ladywell, Dover. Schofield turned down opportunities to continue his research at Cambridge; a research job at Rolls-Royce Ltd.; and a post at Repton School. Instead he moved to Loughborough.

=== Loughborough College ===
Following the Technical Instruction Act 1889, and the appointment of Brockington in 1903, the way was clear for him to propose the establishment of a technical institute in Loughborough, which was eventually opened on 29 September 1909. The first Principal was Samuel Charles Laws. When he moved to Wigan and later London, he left behind an efficient and growing institute.

In September 1915 Herbert Schofield moved to Loughborough as the next Principal of the Technical Institute, and also to assist the Director of Education for Leicestershire (William Allport Brockington) in inspecting the county’s evening schools.

As demand for more munitions grew during World War I, Schofield set about training workers in thoroughly practical ways, avoiding the more theoretical approaches of other institutes. Using reconditioned equipment that had been discarded, the first group of 30 trainees, all women, learned how to make shells before moving to factories elsewhere. By the end of 1916 the Loughborough Institute was the third largest such facility in the country; by the end of the war 2209 students had been trained and given jobs in munition factories. Schofield was awarded an MBE in 1917 for his war services. After the war, he introduced a five-year full-time diploma course in mechanical engineering for former officers, based on his ‘training on production philosophy.

In the inter-war years, Schofield oversaw big developments in the college, including:

- setting-up a department for training handicraft teachers in 1930
- establishing an annual summer school in 1931, offering courses mainly in physical education and arts and crafts
- creating an aeronautical engineering department in 1935
- the gradual extension of the college's work in physical education
- and, throughout, acquiring property for use as student hostels

In 1921 he joined the board of directors for Atalanta Ltd. the first company in Britain to employ only women engineers, initially set up in Loughborough with the support of the Women's Engineering Society. The company was run by Annette Ashberry who was a graduate of the Loughborough college BSc engineering course and fellow board members included the leading women engineers of the day Rachel Parsons, Caroline Haslett, Lady Eleanor Shelley-Rolls, and Dora Turner.

During WWII, the college aided the war effort by providing a wide range of technical courses for personnel of all three services, and by housing the RAF medical rehabilitation unit. The immediate post-war period brought a substantial increase in student numbers as former servicemen flocked into the college; and Schofield introduced a full-time course in librarianship in January 1947.

Herbert Schofield retired in December 1950 at the age of sixty-eight.

An exhibition at Charnwood Museum, Loughborough was held in 2009 to celebrate the centenary of the University. It was officially opened by George Drake, the great-grandson of Dr Herbert Schofield and a first-year Economics student at Loughborough,

=== Technical affiliations and awards ===
(Source)

- A.R.C.S.: Associate Royal College of Science (Mechanics and Physics)
- D.I.C.: Diploma Imperial College
- MIMechE: Member of the Institution of Mechanical Engineers
- AMICE: Associate Member of the Institution of Civil Engineers
- MIStructE: Member of the Institution of Structural Engineers
- FInstP: Fellow Institute of Physics
- PhD: Doctor of Philosophy (1923)
- Honorary Secretary of the Association of Technical Institutions (1924)
- President of the Institute of Production Engineers (1948-9)
- Chairman or President of:
  - The Association of Principals of Technical Institutions,
  - The Association of Technical Institutions
  - The Institute of Linguists. President from 1938-51
- Served on several official committees:
  - The National Trade Advisory Committee for Engineering and Shipbuilding
  - The Consultative Committee of the Ministry of Education
  - The National Advisory Council on Industry and Commerce
- Past-Chairman of the Council and Honorary Treasurer of the Association for the Advancement of Education in Industry and Commerce
- Member of the Council and Chairman of the Examinations Committee of the East Midland Educational Union
- Witness before or gave evidence to:
  - The Hadow Report on The Education of the Adolescent (1926
  - The Spens Report on Secondary Education with Special Reference to Grammar Schools and Technical High Schools (1938)
  - The McNair Report on Teachers and Youth Leaders (1944)

=== Rotary International ===
Judging from his speeches, Schofield was a passionate Rotarian. He was the first Chairman of his local district association in 1928, President of Rotary International Britain & Ireland (RIBI) in 1931-2, and Vice-President of Rotary International 1933-4. He took his international role seriously, travelling to eight Annual Conventions of Rotary International in North America, and one each in Vienna and Nice, from 1930-39.

=== Libraries ===
Schofield was appointed by the Government to chair a committee investigating the state of libraries in technical institutions. He presented a meeting of a local branch of the Library Association in 1939 with many findings, including the fact that 16 technical colleges had no library, and 44 had books but no room to store them. His forthcoming report would stress the need for grants for book purchase.

=== Legacy ===
The Schofield Society, founded by alumni and friends in 2010, recognises a group of leading donors to Loughborough University and the difference they are making. The society's aim is to continue Schofield’s work "by providing ongoing support for student welfare and continuing to pursue Herbert’s ambition for Loughborough to have national & global impact".

=== Family ===
Herbert Schofield met Clara Johns, from London, at the village of Iffley. They were married on 12 February 1918 at St Michael, Headingley, Leeds. Their home was named "Iffley", first in Park Road then in Ashby Road, Loughborough. They had a daughter, Patricia Margaret Dawtry, born on 6 June 1922, and adopted a son, Richard, from an orphanage a few years later. Clara (known as Ray) died from a progressive disease, at her home in Loughborough on 3 March 1928, aged 28.

On 30 September 1950, Patricia married Captain Donald James Drake at All Saints Church, Loughborough. Her husband was formerly with the Royal Inniskilling Fusiliers, and was awarded a Military Cross during the war; at the time of his marriage he was Labour Officer at Holwell Works, Asfordby Hill. The couple lived in nearby Melton Mowbray, and had three sons there. Donald died on 20 August 1968, at their then home at Holy Well Cottage, Snells Nook Lane, Loughborough; he was 46. Patricia died in Loughborough the following year; she was 47.

Dr Herbert Schofield was a devout Christian who kept his college in close contact with the Church of England, and a lay canon of Leicester Cathedral. Described as being "not physically large" but with "a masterful presence and ... enormous energy", Schofield drove himself and his staff very hard. He was awarded the CBE in 1946.

Schofield died in a nursing home at Radmoor Road, Loughborough, on 18 September 1963, leaving his estate to Patricia Drake. His will also shows that he left £250 and "such scientific and engineering books in my library as he may select", to his adopted son, whose full name was Michael Richard Antony Schofield. Michael, born in 1918, married Hilary J Milner in Loughborough in 1944, having served briefly as a Flying Officer in the RAF. They had two children and emigrated to the USA. Michael died in Orlando, FLA in 1994.
