= The Bush Inn, Tasmania =

Australian pub

Bush Inn
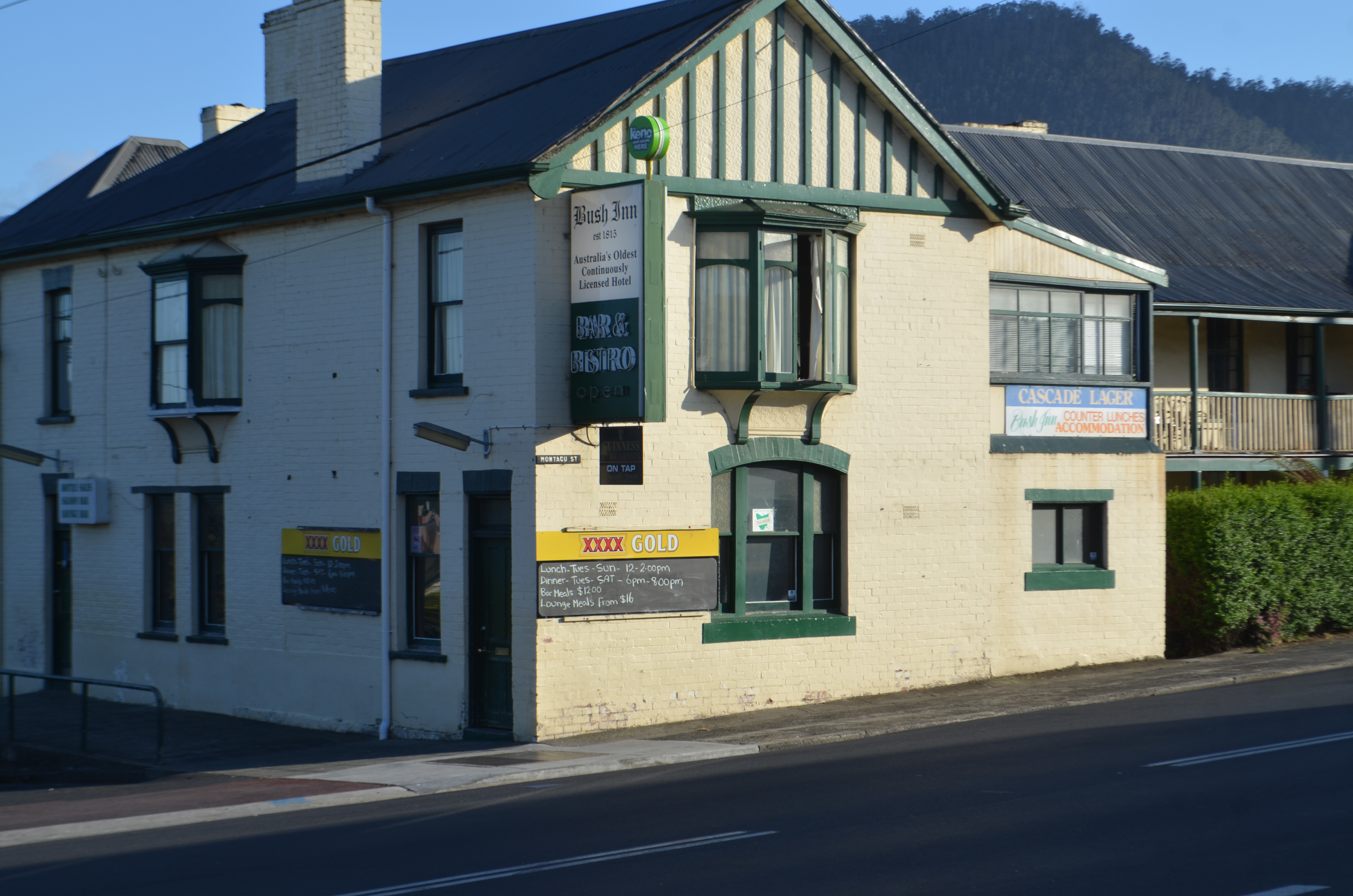
- The Bush Inn in 2016

General information
- Location: 49-51 Montagu Street; New Norfolk; Tasmania, Australia
- Coordinates: 42.77883°S 147.06121°E
- Construction started: c.1815; 211 years ago
- Client: Ann Bridger

Design and construction
- Architect: D. W. Bush

Tasmanian Heritage Register
- Place ID: 1261
- Status: Permanently Registered

The Bush Inn is an Australian pub and hotel located in the Derwent Valley township of New Norfolk, Tasmania. It is one of the oldest pubs in Australia, and is thought by some to be the oldest continuously operating pub in Australia. The establishment is listed on the Tasmanian Heritage Register and the Australian Heritage Database.

== History ==
The establishment's history is closely linked to the development of the Derwent Valley, one of the oldest agricultural districts in the Commonwealth. Settlement began at New Norfolk in 1808 when convicts were transferred from Norfolk Island's penal settlement. Mrs. Ann Bridger, who had spent time on Norfolk Island, obtained a grant of land for the present hotel when the settlement opened up in the early 1810s. The first road in the colony was built in 1819, passing in front of Mrs. Bridger's parcel of land. Some sources say the building has operated as a pub since 1815, however a more likely date is 1825. In April that year a Hobart newspaper noted that at New Norfolk "a widow lady named Bridger has just completed a very commodious two-storey house of public entertainment, which is deservedly well frequented." In October of the same year, Ann Bridger received a licence to sell spirits, wine and beer at the sign of the Bush [Inn] at New Norfolk.

=== Maritana ===
Irish composer William Vincent Wallace lived at the Bush Inn throughout 1838 and composed operatic lyrics for Scenes That Are Brightest and parts of Maritana on the hotel verandah. Dame Nellie Melba is known to have sung lyrics from Maritana during her stay at the hotel while undertaking her 1924 farewell concert in Tasmania. On 20 June 1932, the opera Maritana was produced at the hotel by a Hobart company directed by Mr. E. J. McCann, creating a unique event wherein the opera was produced where its melodies were composed. The performance was broadcast through station 7ZL.

=== Telephonic achievements ===
The first trunk telephone call in Australia was made to the hotel from the Hobart General Post Office on 1 December 1888, and the first call to London in 1939.

== Architecture ==
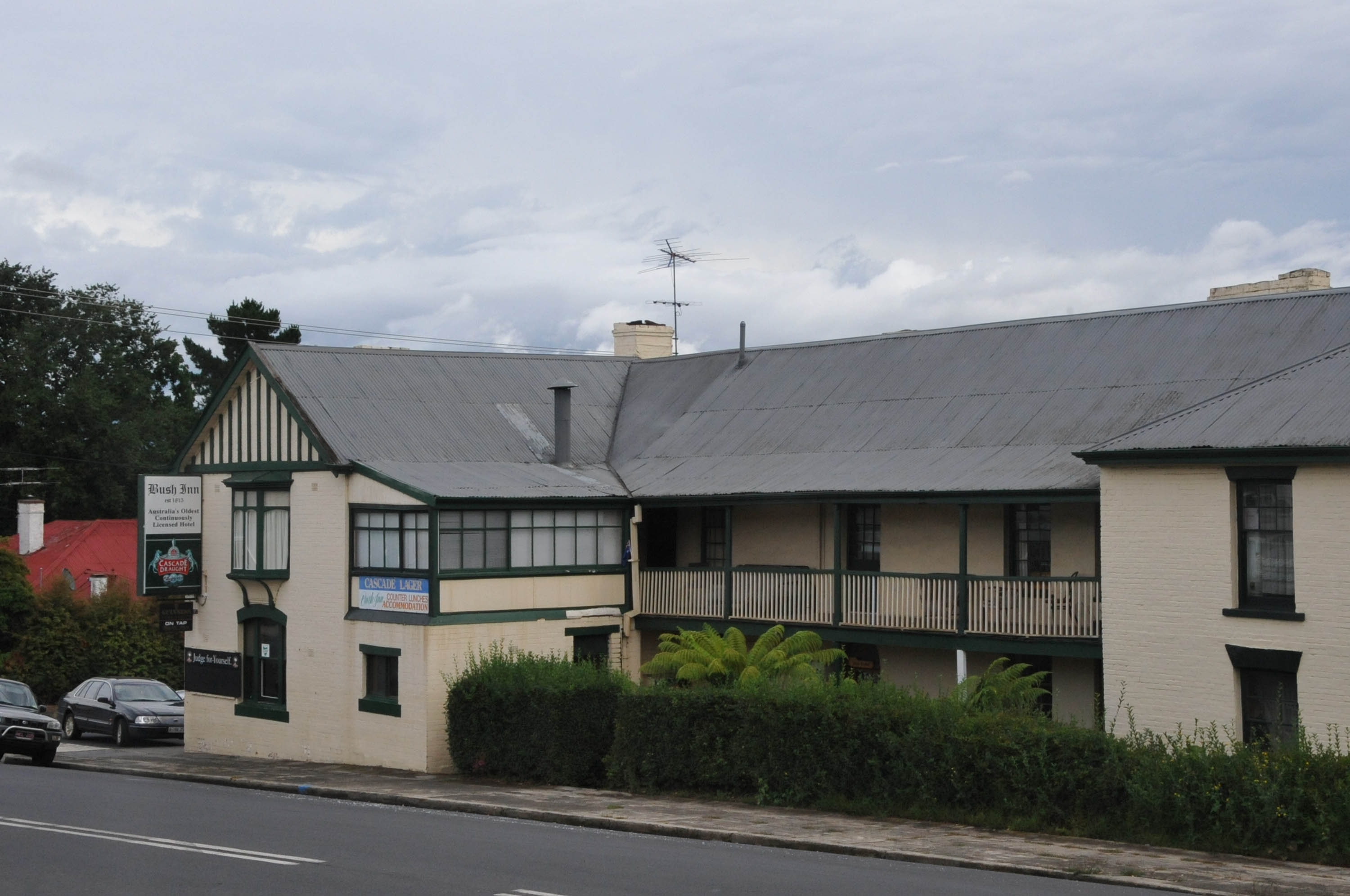

Originally built in the Georgian architectural style, the Bush Inn has undergone less sympathetic historical extensions. Below the pub is a large wooden door that once led to a wine cellar and butchery via stone steps. There is also a hidden tunnel said to transport patients from the Derwent River to the Royal Derwent Hospital discreetly, avoiding public streets.

The garden once hosted a pear tree believed to be planted in 1837 by Lady Jane Franklin.

== See also ==
- List of the oldest buildings in Australia
- List of oldest companies in Australia
