= Tasmanian Heritage Register =

State heritage register for Tasmania, Australia

The Tasmanian Heritage Register is the statutory heritage register of the Australian state of Tasmania. It is defined as a list of areas currently identified as having historic cultural heritage importance to Tasmania as a whole. The Register is kept by the Tasmanian Heritage Council within the meaning of the Tasmanian Historic Cultural Heritage Act 1995. It encompasses in addition the Heritage Register of the Tasmanian branch of the National Trust of Australia, which was merged into the Tasmanian Heritage Register. The enforcement of the heritage's requirements is managed by Heritage Tasmania.

== 2015–2017 removals and additions ==
The register integrity has been complicated by changes of the list from 2015-2017. A state government push to eliminate 1650 properties from the register has led to several criticisms and the resignation of a senior staff member of Heritage Tasmania.

== Heritage listings ==
An incomplete list of Tasmanian heritage listings as of 2019:

- Albert Hall, Launceston
- Avalon Theatre, Hobart
- Boag's Brewery, Launceston
- Brickendon Estate, Longford
- Bridgewater Bridge
- Callington Mill, Oatlands
- Cadbury's Estate, Claremont
- Cape Bruny Lighthouse
- Cape Sorell Lighthouse
- Cape Wickham Lighthouse
- Cascade Brewery, South Hobart
- Cascades Female Factory, South Hobart
- Cataract Gorge
- Cheshunt House, Meander
- Church of the Apostles, Launceston
- City Park, Launceston
- Coal Mines Historic Site, Saltwater Rover
- Constitution Dock, Hobart
- Currie Lighthouse
- Deal Island Lighthouse
- Elwick Racecourse, Glenorchy
- Empire Hotel, Queenstown
- Entally House, Hadspen
- Franklin Square, Hobart
- Gaiety Theatre, Zeehan
- General Post Office, Hobart
- St David's Cathedral, Hobart
- Hobart Cenotaph
- Hobart City Hall
- Hobart Real Tennis Club
- Hobart Synagogue
- Hobart Town Hall
- Holyman House, Launceston
- Hope and Anchor Tavern, Hobart
- Ingle Hall, Hobart
- Iron Pot Lighthouse
- Kelly's Steps, Hobart
- Lady Franklin Gallery, Lenah Valley
- Launceston College, Tasmania
- Longford Railway Bridge
- Low Head Lighthouse
- Maatsuyker Island Lighthouse
- Majestic Theatre, Launceston
- Maria Island
- Mona Vale, Ross
- Montrose House, Glenorchy
- National Theatre, Launceston
- North Hobart Post Office
- Old Woolstore Apartment Hotel, Hobart
- Parliament House, Hobart
- Port Arthur, Tasmania
- Prince's Square, Launceston
- Princess Theatre, Launceston
- Queen Victoria Museum and Art Gallery
- Queenstown Oval, Launceston
- Red Bridge, Campbell Town
- Richmond Bridge
- Richmond Gaol
- Ross Bridge
- Ross Female Factory
- Royal Hobart Hospital
- Royal Tasmanian Botanical Gardens, Hobart
- St Andrew's Kirk, Launceston
- St George's Anglican Church, Battery Point
- Saltwater River, Tasmania
- Shot Tower, Taroona
- St John's Anglican Church, New Town
- St John's Church, Launceston
- St Mary's Cathedral, Hobart
- Star Theatre, Invermay
- State Library of Tasmania, Hobart
- Symmons Plains Estate, Perth
- Table Cape, Wynyard
- Tasman Island Lighthouse
- Tasmanian Museum and Art Gallery, Hobart
- Theatre Royal, Hobart
- Victoria Dock, Hobart
- Woolmers Estate, Longford
- Wrest Point Hotel Casino, Sandy Bay
- York Park, Launceston
