= Friends Meeting House, Adelaide =

Religious meeting hall in Adelaide, South Australia

Friends Meeting House
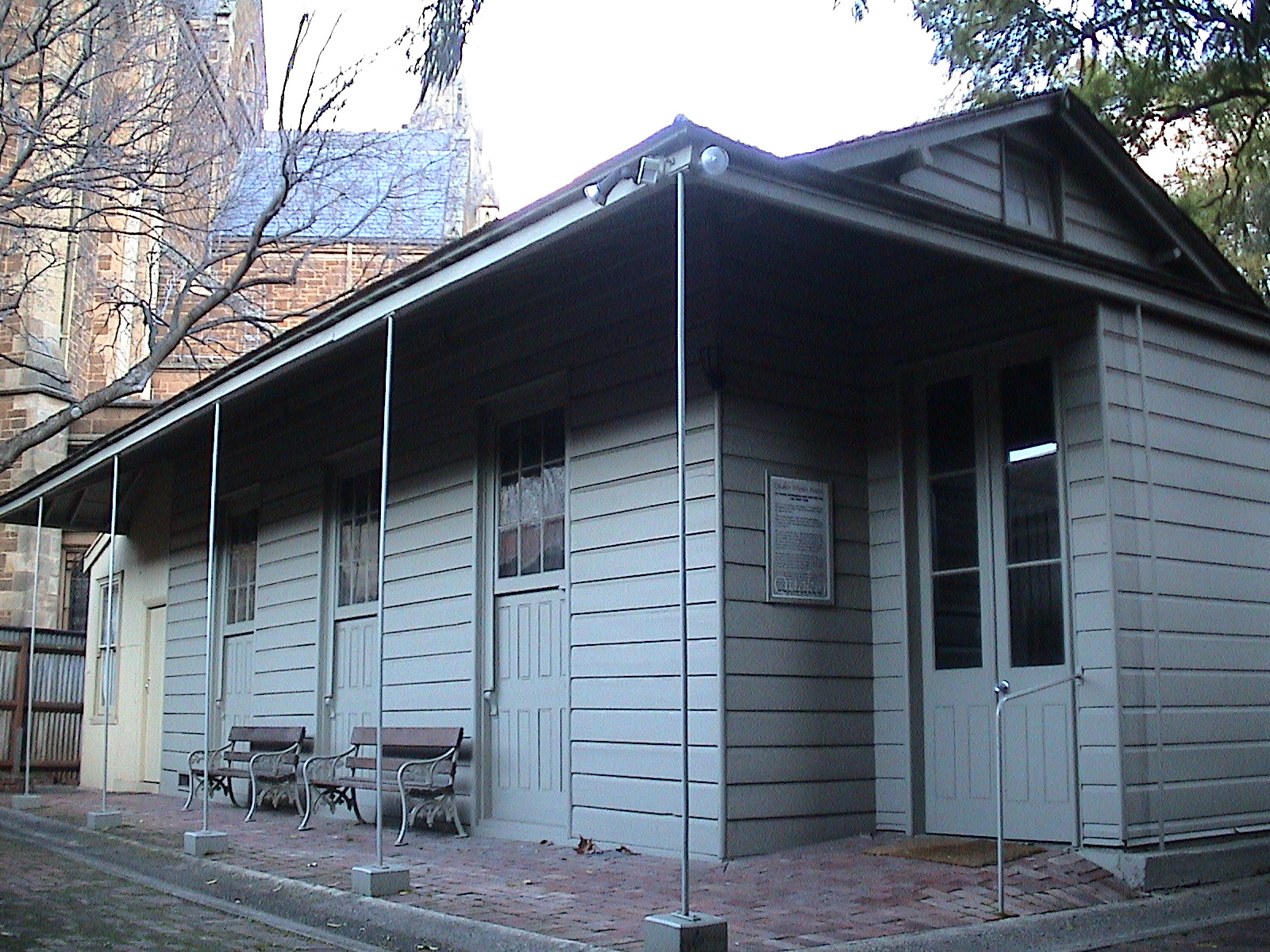
- Friends Meeting House in 2012
- Alternative names: Quaker Meeting House

General information
- Type: Quaker meeting house
- Location: 41 Pennington Terrace, North Adelaide, South Australia, Australia
- Coordinates: 34°54′45″S 138°35′52″E
- Completed: 1840
- Client: Religious Society of Friends

Technical details
- Material: Prefabricated timber, iron and slate

Design and construction
- Architect: Henry Manning

South Australian Heritage Register
- Official name: Quakers Meeting House
- Designated: 28 May 1981
- Reference no.: 10864

The Adelaide meeting house of the Religious Society of Friends ("Quakers") is situated on Pennington Terrace, North Adelaide, South Australia, literally in the shadow of St Peter's Cathedral, on its west side. It is substantially made of timber, the only wooden church building in the City. Constructed in 1840, it is also the oldest wooden building in Adelaide, the oldest Quaker building in Australia and likely the oldest building of worship in South Australia by the date of completion of the current building, although Trinity Church Adelaide is the oldest by foundations.

Besides Sunday meetings, weddings and the like, it has also hosted secular meetings, particularly for peace, education, temperance and other social causes. It also served briefly for Adelaide's Presbyterian congregation prior to construction of the Church of Scotland building on Grenfell Street, also for the North Adelaide congregation of the Church of England.

The land on which it stands was donated to the Society of Friends by church member J. Barton Hack. He also had the contract for construction of the prefabricated building, supplied by Henry Manning of London, around 1840. (The rectory of Trinity Church, Adelaide was also a "Manning's portable cottage".)

Despite a prohibition on churchyard burials in the City of Adelaide, there were around seventeen graves in its tiny yard, including that of J. B. Hack's child, Annie Mary Hack. and a son and first wife of Joseph Barritt and Louisa Watson on 25 April 1839, cousin of Annie Mary Hack.Henry Watson diary From 1858 no further burials took place there, as a separate area had been reserved for Quakers at the West Terrace Cemetery.

The meeting house significantly predates St. Peter's Cathedral, the land for which was purchased in 1862 and the foundation stone laid in 1869. A condition of the land sale was provision of a right of way to the meeting house.

On 28 May 1981, the building was listed on the South Australian Heritage Register.
