= Symmons Plains Estate =

Historic farm and mansion in Tasmania

Symmons Plains Estate is a historic farm and mansion in the locality of the same name, near Perth, Tasmania. A 856ha property, the estate dates back to 1820s, with the main Georgian house built in 1839. It is listed on the Tasmanian Heritage Register. In 1978, the homestead and its garden and outbuildings were registered on the now-defunct Register of the National Estate.

== History ==
The property was granted to Rev. John Youl in the 1820s. The house was built in 1839, and the Youl family lived at the property for 7 generations. In 1960, racing driver and family heir John Youl developed neighbouring Symmons Plains Raceway from part of the property. The house came to worldwide media attention in 2011 when a false story of the home being sold to J.K. Rowling for 10 million AUD was printed by Women's Day. The story was picked up by national and international news outlets, including Sunrise Breakfast Show, Perez Hilton and Nine News, but it was quickly debunked by news outlets including The Examiner and ABC's Media Watch. In reality it was purchased by Clovelly Tasmania, a farming subsidiary of the Ingleby Company.
