= Hope and Anchor Tavern =

Historical public house in Tasmania, Australia

Coordinates: 42°52′52″S 147°19′54″E

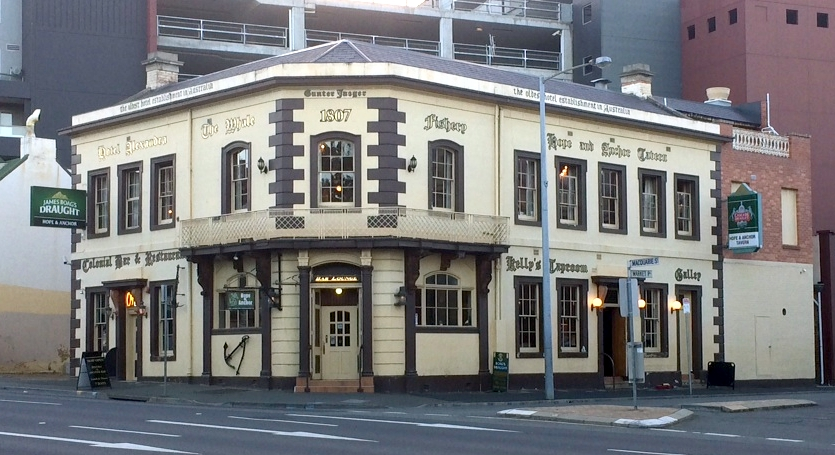
- Former names: Hope and Anchor Hotel

General information
- Type: Pub
- Architectural style: Georgian
- Location: Hobart, Tasmania, Australia
- Construction started: 1807
- Completed: 1807
- Owner: John Kelly (2023)

The Hope and Anchor (formerly known as the Hope and Anchor Hotel, the Alexandra, the Whale Fishery, and simply the Hope) is a historic public house located in Hobart, Tasmania, Australia. It was established in 1807, and holds one of the oldest pub licenses in Australia. However, its claim to be the oldest continuously licensed pub is sometimes contested due to periods of closure.

== History ==
The tavern has undergone several name changes since its opening, reflecting its connection to Hobart's maritime past. The establishment was originally a popular venue for sailors and traders arriving at Hobart's port. During the 19th century, it was known as the Whale Fishery, a name linked to the city’s role in the whaling industry during the colonial period.

The building is an example of Georgian architecture, with many of its original features remaining intact. It has been referenced in several historical accounts, including the memoirs of Captain A.E. Sykes. Over time, the tavern has undergone restoration efforts to maintain its structural integrity and historical appearance.

== Ownership and restoration ==
In recent years, the pub has changed ownership multiple times. For many years, it was owned by Gunter Jaeger, who collected antiques and artefacts that are displayed inside the tavern. In 2022, local businessman John Kelly, known for restoring heritage buildings such as Soundy’s Building and the State Cinema, purchased the property. Kelly became the licensee in February 2023. His restoration plans include an archaeological dig on the adjoining vacant land, which could potentially uncover artefacts from Hobart's early colonial period.

== Heritage listing ==
The Hope and Anchor Tavern has been listed on the Tasmanian Heritage Register since 1998. The listing recognises the tavern’s historical significance and its well-preserved Georgian design. It remains a key attraction for both locals and visitors, contributing to Hobart’s heritage tourism.

== Controversy over age ==
The Hope and Anchor Tavern is often referred to as Australia’s oldest pub, but this claim has been disputed by the Bush Inn in New Norfolk. The Bush Inn, established in 1815, has operated continuously since its opening, whereas the Hope and Anchor has experienced periods of closure while retaining its licence.

== See also ==
- List of oldest companies in Australia
- The Bush Inn, Tasmania
- History of Tasmania
- List of pubs in Australia
