= Youl family =

The Youl family are a historic family of Tasmania, descended from John Youl, who immigrated from Tahiti where he had been a missionary. Their family home was Symmons Plains Estate until 2011. The family have been prominent in Tasmanian agriculture and Australian sport.

== James Arndell Youl (1811–1904) ==
James Arndell was the eldest son of John Youl and inherited Symmons Plains. He became a noted pastoralist, best known for introducing brown trout to Australia, and was a political representative of Tasmania to England for several decades. He was made C.M.G. in 1874 and promoted to KCMG in 1891. He was a director of the Commercial Banking Company of Sydney for some years. He died in 1904, age 95.

== Richard Youl (1821–1897) ==
Richard was the younger brother of James Arndell. He grew up and was educated in England, graduating from the University of St Andrews, moving to Victoria when he returned to Australia. He was a noted medical practitioner, becoming in 1852 a founding member and secretary of the Victoria Medical Association. In 1853 was appointed assistant surgeon to the Melbourne Gaols and a magistrate and district coroner for Bourke, New South Wales. During 1854 he was acting coroner for Melbourne, and 1854-1867 he was visiting justice to penal establishments in Victoria. He became Melbourne Coroner permanently in 1857, serving for 44 years. He died in 1897.

== John Youl (1932–2009) ==
John was successful motor racing driver and pastoralist. He created the Symmons Plains Raceway out of part of the family estate.

== Simon Youl (1965– ) ==
Simon Youl is a former professional tennis player. He represented Australia at the 1984 Olympic Games and was World No. 80 at the height of his career.

== Andrew Youl (1963– ) ==
Andrew Youl is a former prominent Tasmanian grazier, having owned and operated Symmons Plains Estate until its eventual sale in 2011.

== Audrey Youl ==
Audrey Youl (née Moore) is a former Olympic swimmer. Under her maiden name Moore she competed at the 1984 Los Angeles Olympic Games, in 100m and 200m backstroke and 200m relay. She came 6th in 100m and 16th in 200m, and the Australian relay team was disqualified. She also competed at two Commonwealth games (1982 and 1986), getting bronze in the 100m backstroke in 1982. She married Andrew Youl, older brother of Simon Youl.
