= Claremont Cottage =

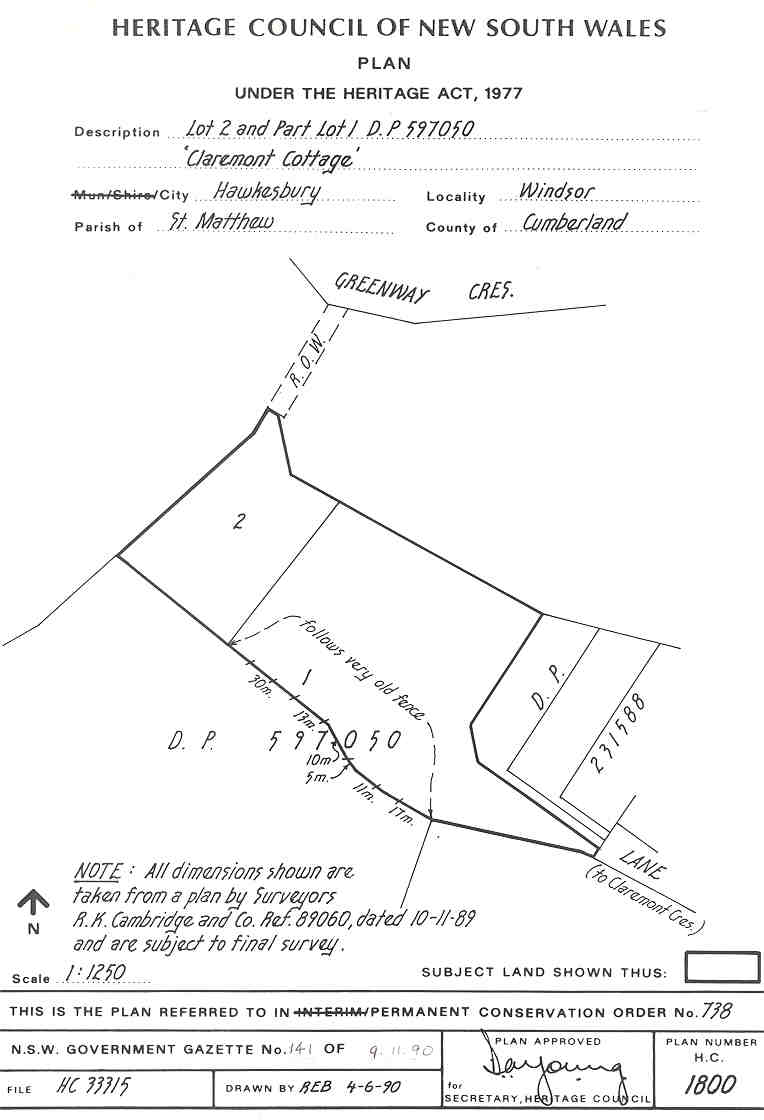
- Heritage boundaries

- Location within New South Wales Location within Australia
- 33.6086°S 150.8090°E
- Location: Claremont Crescent, Windsor, City of Hawkesbury, New South Wales, Australia

History
- Built: 1807–1822

Site notes
- Owner: Cassmar Hotels Pty Ltd

New South Wales Heritage Register
- Official name: Claremont Cottage
- Type: state heritage (built)
- Designated: 2 April 1999
- Reference no.: 738
- Type: Cottage
- Category: Residential buildings (private)

Claremont Cottage is a heritage-listed residence at Claremont Crescent, Windsor, New South Wales, an outer suburb of Sydney, Australia. It was built from 1807 to 1822. It was added to the New South Wales State Heritage Register on 2 April 1999.

== History ==
In 1796, John Pugh and Charles Thomas were granted adjoining farms, though the official deed was not issued until 1802, and commenced to clear their land. Pugh's grant of 25 acres became known as "Pugh's Farm", while Thomas' grant of 20 acres became "Thomas Farm". In 1804, Pugh received a grant of 190 acres at what was known as "Mulgrave Farm". By 1806, Pugh was a substantial landholder, with 22 acres in grain, 193 acres of pasture and for horses and 11 pigs. However, in 1811, he sold his farm to John Jones and went to live in Windsor, selling a remaining landholding to Henry Kable in 1812.

In 1822, John Jones conveyed a significant landholding to William Cox, including Pugh's Farm, 10 acres of Thomas' Farm, and 24.5 acres of other land. Cox was succeeded as owner Alfred Cox. Though William Cox is listed as an owner of Claremont Cottage, he had actually settled at Clarendon - a few miles west of Windsor - and is not believed to have lived at Claremont.

The nucleus of the present Claremont Cottage stood on the land by the time William Cox became owner in 1822. The main body of the brick cottage was completed at the same time as the nearby St Matthew's Anglican Church (1820), but the kitchen has been ascribed to the first owner of the property, John Pugh. It is doubtful that the outbuildings which form part of the rear of Claremont were built by Pugh in 1796. However it seems that they were extant by 1822. It also appears from various evidence that a building occupied by Pugh stood on that site in 1807. It is possible that the building he occupied in 1807 was a brick cottage that now forms part of the rear section of Claremont.

From 1828 the cottage was occupied by Francis Beddeck, solicitor, who was married to Elizabeth Blachford, sister to Mrs William Cox. Upon Blachford's marriage to Beddeck, Governor Darling gave her two square miles of land as a marriage portion.

It was later owned by James Chaseling from 1870 to 1906 and prominent dairy farming figure Sir Philip Belmont Charley from 1936 to 1976. Charley lived there with his wife Norma Charley (nee Nivison).

== Description ==
The original Claremont Cottage was a Colonial Georgian cottage built of stuccoed brick with wide verandahs all contained under a low pitched hipped roof. It had double French doors opening onto the verandah, other windows being twelve pane type with louvered shutters and flat stone lintels. It retained some original joinery. The front rooms were connected to the older rear kitchen section by a covered breezeway, typical of an early homestead.

It was substantially destroyed by fire c. 1970s-80s, resulting in the property becoming temporarily abandoned. The oldest building remains and some small remnant parts of the 1820s section, together with other old sections (not dated). The major part of 1820s section had to be rebuilt.

A mature Moreton Bay fig tree (Ficus macrophylla) was removed in 2010.

The garden is much changed. There is a good view west from the house across a dam to adjoining ploughed paddocks. Behind the oldest building is a circular garden bed which contains a large grave headstone (loose). There is a driveway lined with Nile lilies (Agapanthus orientalis) from the gates down to the back of the building complex. An earlier drive came through on an upper level on the eastern side of the buildings ending in a carriage building (no longer existing).

In the early 2000s the property was sold and the current owners have rebuilt.

== Heritage listing ==
One of the oldest remaining houses in the Windsor district having associations with many distinguished Hawkesbury families dating back to 1796 including William Cox from 1822 to 1849; Francis Beddeck, the lawyer, from 1850 to 1853; James Chaseling from 1870 to 1906; and Philip Charley from 1936 to 1976.

Claremont Cottage has kept its colonial atmosphere, thanks to sympathetic additions and alterations over time, and is a good example from the early Colonial period.

Claremont Cottage was listed on the New South Wales State Heritage Register on 2 April 1999 having satisfied the following criteria.

The place is important in demonstrating the course, or pattern, of cultural or natural history in New South Wales.

Claremont Cottage is one of the oldest buildings in the Hawkesbury region, dating back to 1796 as indicated by a plaque on its wall listing all of its previous owners.

The place has a strong or special association with a person, or group of persons, of importance of cultural or natural history of New South Wales's history.

The ownership of Claremont Cottage is a long list of distinguished Hawkesbury families dating back to 1796. In particular, William Cox from 1822 to 1849, and Francis Beddeck from 1850 to 1853. Though William Cox is listed as an owner, it is doubtful that he ever lived in this house. Cox had originally arrived in Australia in 1800 as paymaster in the NSW Corps, and returned to Australia once more after a trip to England in 1807, when he is known to have settled at Clarendon, west of Windsor, where he ran a large and efficient estate. Cox is best remembered for the 101 miles of road that he built across the Blue Mountains with the aid of twenty convicts and eight soldiers between July 1814 and January 1815. He also built houses and public buildings, conducted minor explorations and was appointed Magistrate by Governor Macquarie. William Cox is also known for his humanitarianism with regard to his treatment of convict servants.

Beddeck arrived in the colony in 1827 and took up residence in Claremont Cottage in 1828. Along with William Cox Jr., he was among those nominated by Governor George Gipps to form the first Windsor District Council.

The place is important in demonstrating aesthetic characteristics and/or a high degree of creative or technical achievement in New South Wales.

Claremont Cottage, with its low eaves and wide verandahs opening out onto gently sloping green lawns, with its cellars and its rambling interior, the front rooms connected to the older rear kitchen section by a covered breezeway, is still a typical early homestead. All additions over time have been made in a logical and sympathetic way, allowing the house to keep its colonial atmosphere which dates back to 1796.

The place has strong or special association with a particular community or cultural group in New South Wales for social, cultural or spiritual reasons.

Claremont Cottage was owned and occupied since 1796 by a long list of distinguished Hawkesbury identities including William Cox and Francis Beddeck. These identities are an integral part of the growth and development of both Windsor and the Hawkesbury district including its first proclaimed local council in 1824.

The place is important in demonstrating the principal characteristics of a class of cultural or natural places/environments in New South Wales.

Dating back to 1796, Claremont Cottage is representative of the typical Colonial building and construction style. The architectural style of the house together the visible changes that have been made to its original structure over time, also reflects the evolution of society and culture from Colonial times to the present.
