= Dairy Cottage, Parramatta =

Building of historical significance in the Sydney suburb of Parramatta

Coordinates: 33°48′24″S 150°59′48″E

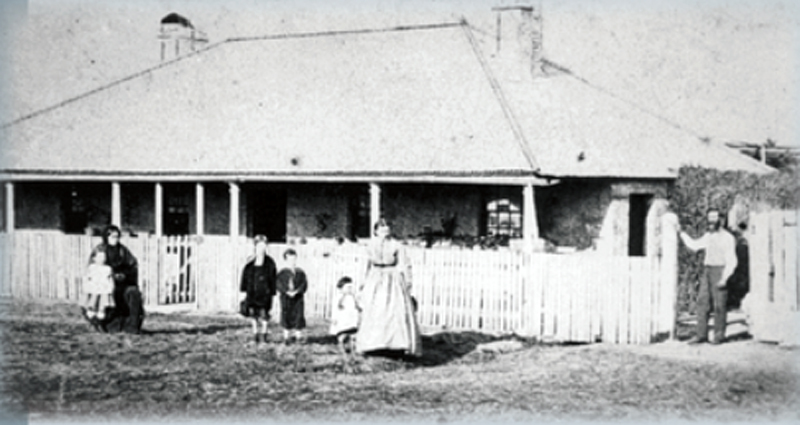
Dairy Cottage in about 1870 when it was home to Ranger Gile's family

Dairy Cottage is a building of historical significance, located in Parramatta Park in the Sydney suburb of Parramatta. Built in 1798, it is one of the earliest residences in Australia and the only 18th Century convict-built cottage. Its history encompasses three distinct phases of occupation: first as the residence of a Second Fleet convict who developed the property into a thriving farm, second as a dairy which supplied milk products to the Governor's household and surrounding population, and third as a ranger's cottage. It is heritage-listed.

== Residence of a Second Fleet convict ==
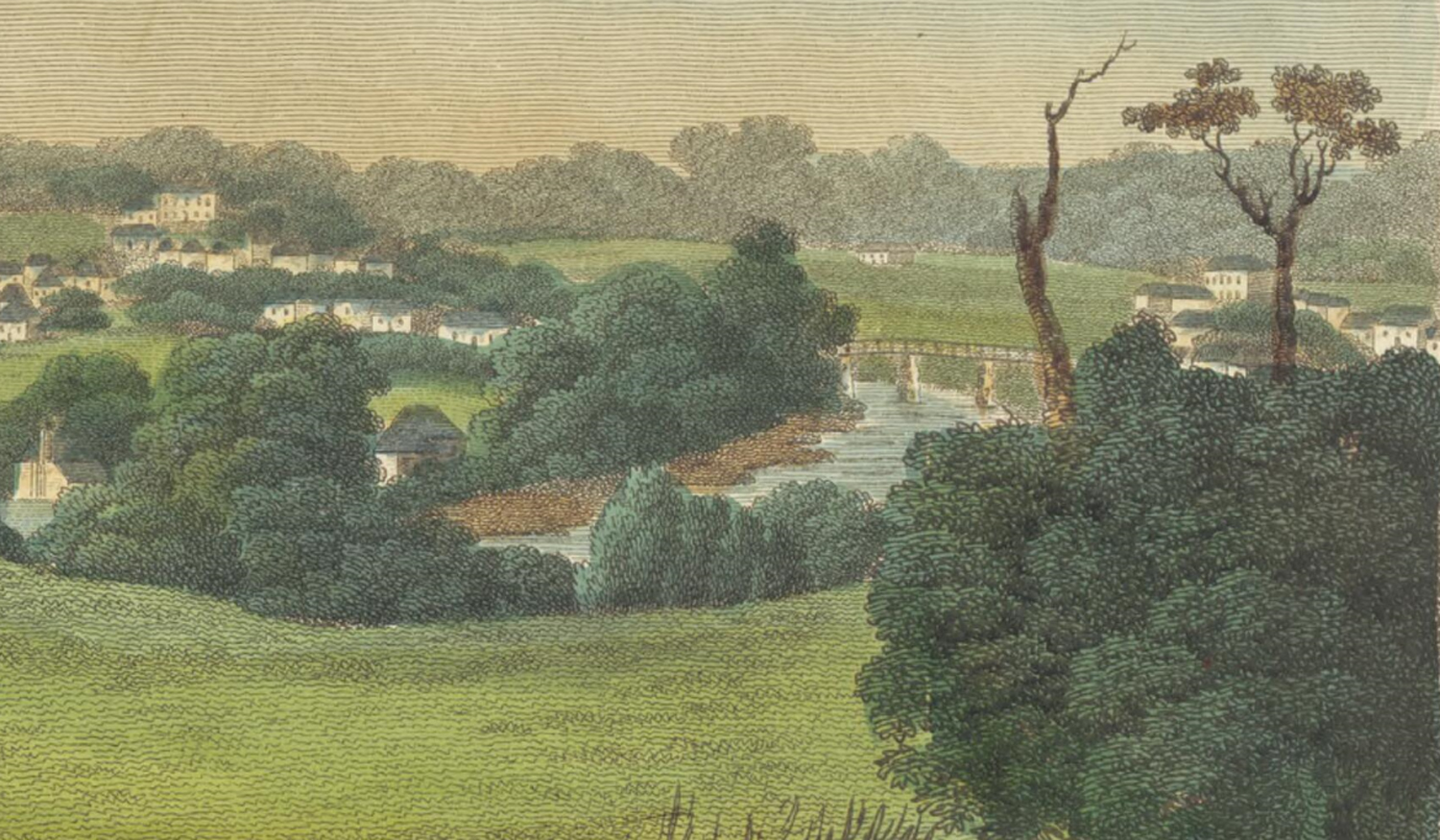
Parramatta in 1811 when it was home to George Salter

George Salter (1751–1832), a convict, built the cottage in 1798 shortly after he had been granted 30 acres of land by Governor Hunter. One of the conditions of this grant was that he was to live there for at least five years and cultivate and improve the land. He fulfilled this requirement because by 1800 records show that the area was fully cleared and cultivated with ten acres of wheat and twenty acres of maize. George was a convict who had been transported to Australia for smuggling in 1790 on the ship “Neptune” which was part of the Second Fleet. He was born in 1751 in a Devonshire village called Kentisbeare. He married Thomazin Southwood in 1780 but she died in 1788 before George was transported.

After George obtained his Certificate of Freedom, he settled on his farm in Parramatta and constructed his cottage. In about 1800 he formed a relationship with Winifred Marsh, a convict who had arrived in 1792 on the "Royal Admiral." She lived with him at Parramatta until 1814.

In 1813, Governor Lachlan Macquarie purchased Salter's farm for the use of the Government. In return he gave him thirty heifers or young breeding cows. George Salter's Will reveals that Governor Macquarie also gave him 260 acres of land at the River Styx. He was also appointed Superintendent of Government Stock.

George later prospered in Tasmania. The 1819 Muster shows that on his land grant he owned 400 cattle, 80 sheep and a horse. He also had a large area under cultivation with wheat, barley beans and potatoes.

== The government dairy ==
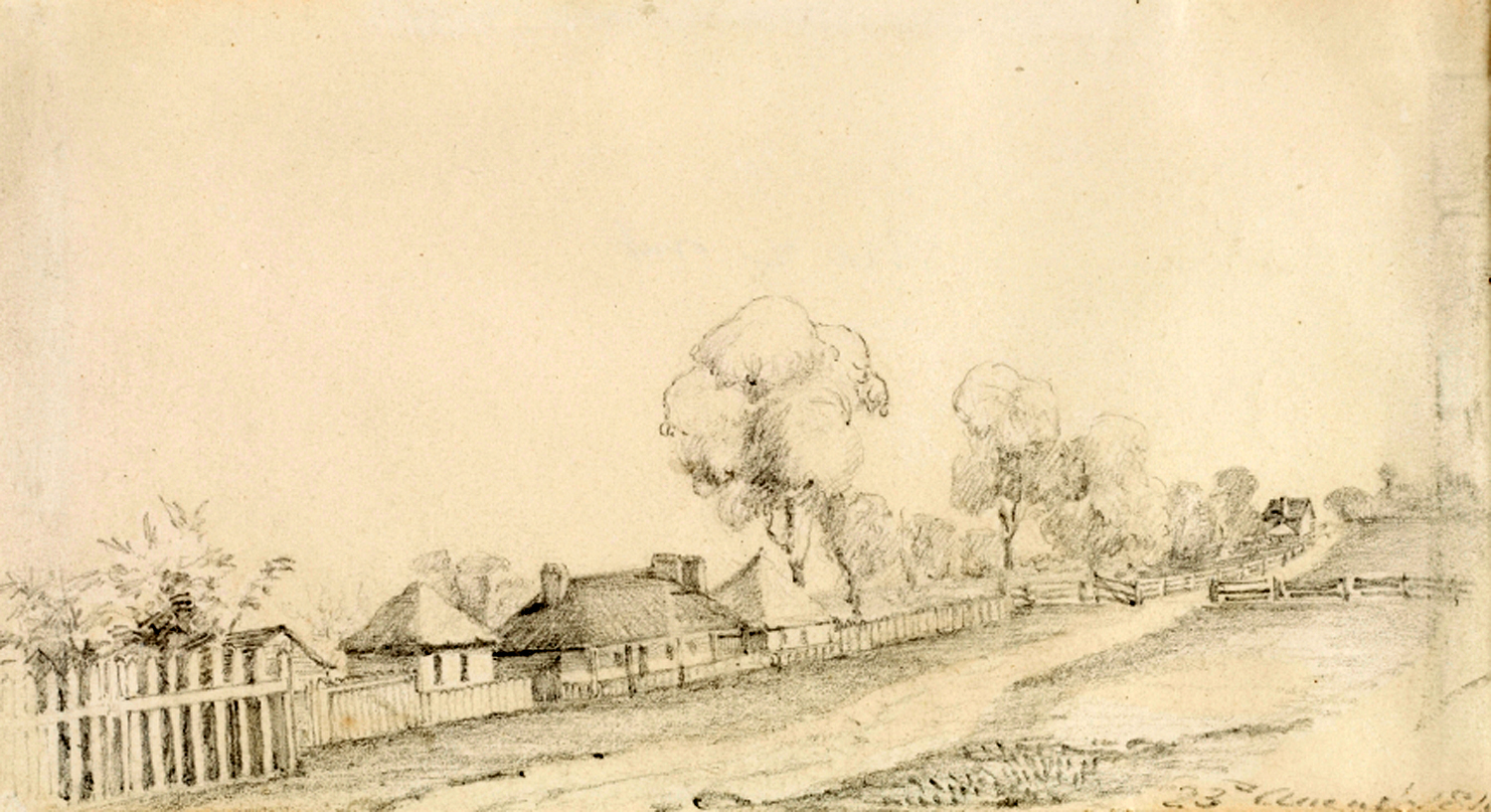
Dairy Cottage in 1844

Several years after Governor Macquarie purchased the property in 1813 he converted the cottage into a dairy. A sunken milk room was constructed on the southern side in about 1823 and another small building was added on the northern side. These two additions are shown in the sketch on the right. Further construction work was also carried out on the cottage.

The milk room was described at the time as "19 feet by 14 feet, sunk to a depth of five feet with fixtures and steps, a circular sewer and cesspool."

One of the first dairy maids employed at the new Governor's Dairy was Elizabeth Eccles, a convict who remained there until her death in 1835. She also worked as housekeeper occasionally for Governors King and Bourke in Government House. She was reported to have been 105 years old when she died but some historians have disputed this because her convict records show that she would have been about 93 at her time of death.

She arrived in the colony in 1788 on the Lady Penrhyn which was one of the ships of the First Fleet. At this time her name was Elizabeth Bird and her sentence was seven years for stealing a lamb. It was noted in her records that she was employed as a domestic servant when she had committed her offence.

Two years after her arrival she was sent to Norfolk Island where she met and later married Thomas Eccles, a First Fleet convict who had arrived on the Scarborough. The couple spent ten years in Norfolk Island where they cultivated a one-acre lot and sold maize to the Government. Both obtained a pardon during this time and in 1801 returned to Sydney.

They moved to Parramatta and leased an acre of land to raise vegetables. Thomas died in 1814 and Elizabeth went to work in the Dairy. She was personally acquainted with Governor Bourke and when she died in 1835 he paid for her funeral.

== The ranger's cottage ==
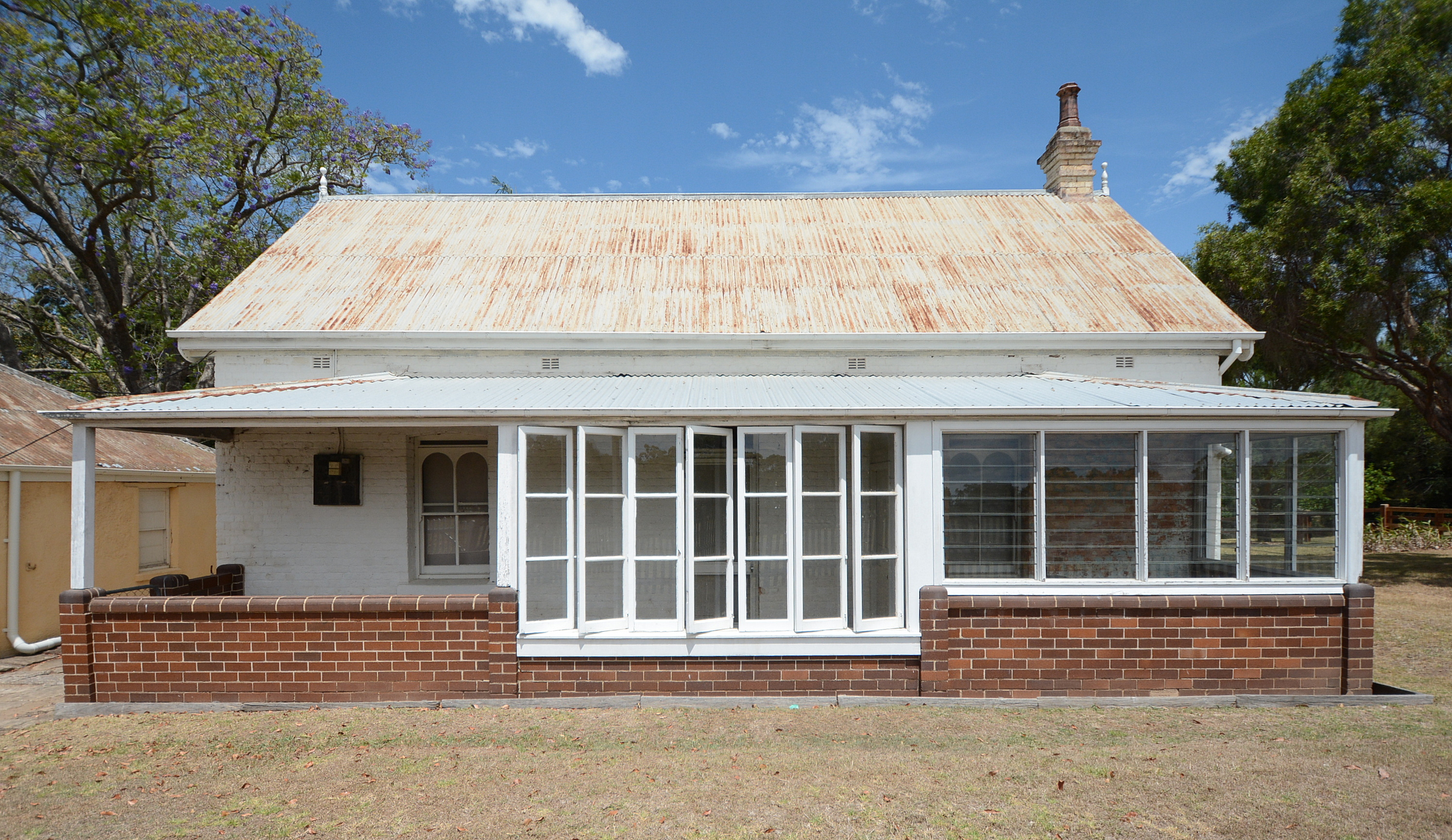
Ranger's Cottage

In 1858 the Government Domain became a Public Park and the Dairy Cottage became the home of the Park Ranger. It was the Ranger's residence until the adjacent house was constructed in about 1875 and then it became the store room.

The first ranger was John William Bartlett. He had worked previously as the superintendent of the Government House Domain before it became a public park. He was born in about 1816 in England and immigrated to Australia. In 1841 he married Mary Fuller (née Turner) who was a widow. They had a small farm at Eastern Creek for some time before he obtained his position at Government House. He was ranger at Parramatta Park until about 1864 and then he moved to Duck Lane in Parramatta where for some time he rented the Cricket Ground from the Trustees of Parramatta Park. He maintained the grounds and let them to groups who wished to play on them. He later moved to Glebe and died in 1886.

The next Ranger was George James Giles who commenced in 1864 and remained there until he retired in 1895. A picture of him and his family outside the Dairy Cottage in about 1870 is shown above.

George was born in 1825 in London. In 1859 he married Janet Hannay who was from Scotland. Soon after their marriage they immigrated to Australia and lived for a few years in Burwood. In 1864 George was appointed as the Ranger and the couple moved to the former Dairy to live. They had seven children many of whom stayed in Parramatta and held important positions in the community.

In about 1875 the new Rangers House was built and the dairy became a store room. In 1878 there was a fire in the Dairy which was described in the newspapers. The roof was destroyed and the stables behind the Dairy were damaged but the building was saved.

The Stone Pine trees in Parramatta Park are attributed to George. Many of these still exist and are in avenues and plantations in the sporting areas north of the river and on the western side. In 1895 George retired and he and his wife Janet moved to Church Street in Parramatta to live. He died there in 1899 and Janet died in 1921.

The next ranger was Joseph Saladine who was formerly employed in Parramatta Park in a more junior position. He was born in 1857 in Dodleston in Cheshire, England. His father was a farmer and Joseph worked with him until his marriage in 1882 to Ada Wilkinson. They immigrated to Australia soon after their marriage and lived for some time in Sydney and then moved to Parramatta. Joseph was the Park Ranger until 1908 when he resigned.

Richard Attwood took his place after his resignation. He had previously been the head gardener Rydalmere Hospital. Unfortunately he died only four years later in 1912.

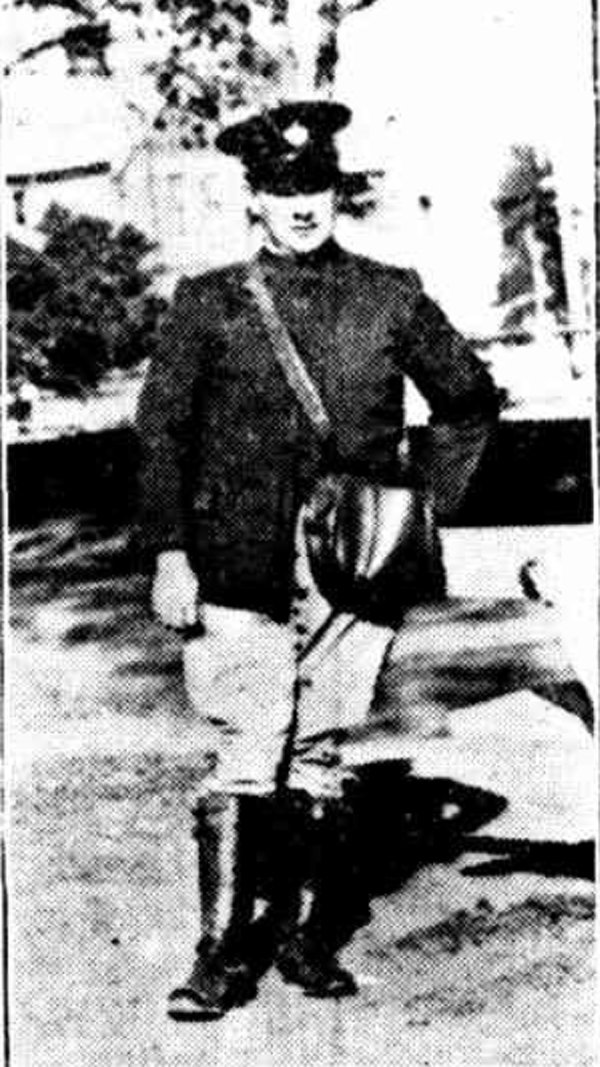
Ranger Cecil Arnold Sim in 1929

Henry Arthur Bateman was the next ranger and he was employed there until 1918. He was later convicted of stealing a horse that was staying in an agistment paddock in Parramatta Park.

From 1918 until 1922 James Alfred George Palmer was the ranger and he was succeeded by Cecil Arnold Sim who remained in this position for forty years.

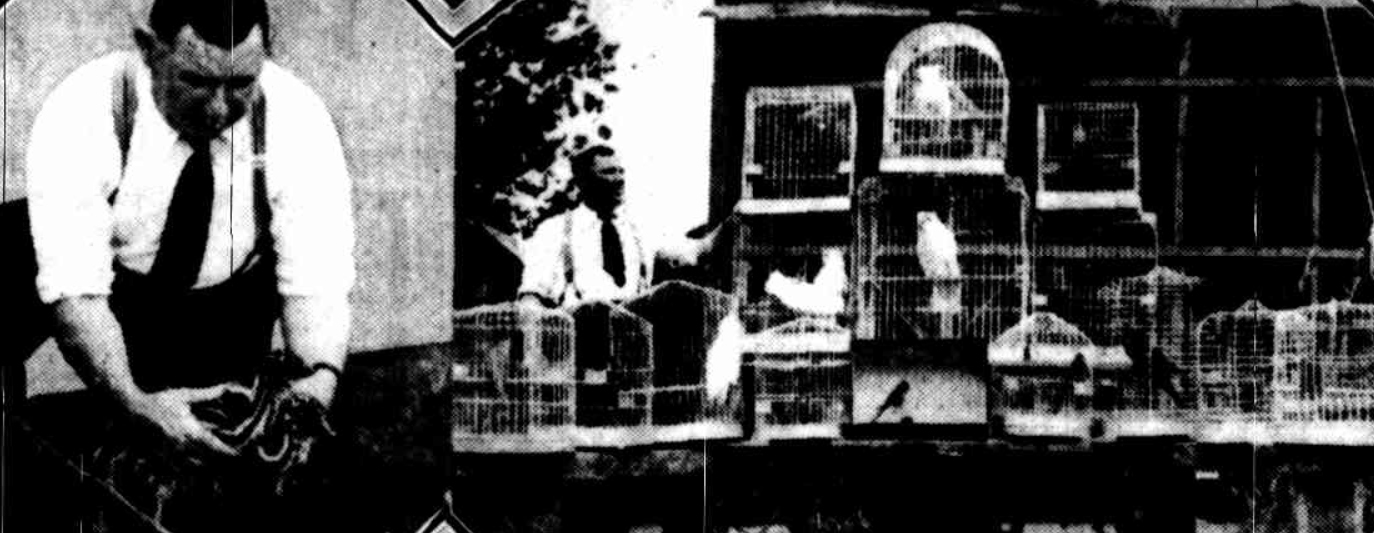
Ranger Cecil Sim with his animals in Parramatta Park in 1937.

Cecil Arnold Sim was born in 1893 in Ipswich Queensland. His father was a blacksmith. In 1914 he married Eva Myee Melville who lived in Granville. The couple had a son Cecil Ernest Sim and a daughter Mavis and for some time lived in the Parramatta area. In 1922 at the age of 29 Cecil became the ranger for Parramatta Park and the family moved into the Rangers Cottage.

Eva's brother was Horace James Melville and in 1937 he came to visit his relatives at Parramatta Park. While he was there he painted murals on the walls which were described in the local paper as being scenes from New Zealand. These paintings can still be seen in the Cottage today. Horace James Melville (1875–1941) was born in 1875 in Granville. His grandfather painted but his most famous relative was his great uncle Harden Sidney Melville who exhibited his work at the Royal Academy in London. Horace moved to New Zealand shortly after his marriage in 1906. He was part of a theatre group and for many years painted the background scenery for their stage productions. He died in Wellington, New Zealand in 1841.

Cecil Sim, the ranger, was known to be particularly fond of animals and in 1937 a newspaper article described the work he was doing to care for sick fauna in the Park. It stated.

"Nurse and protector of the birds and animals in Parramatta Park is Mr. C. Sim, ranger for many years. He superintends their diet, diagnoses their ailments, is solicitous for their comfort and understands their almost human foibles and peculiarities as few men do."

Cecil remained as ranger in Parramatta Park until 1962 and then retired.

== The cottage today ==
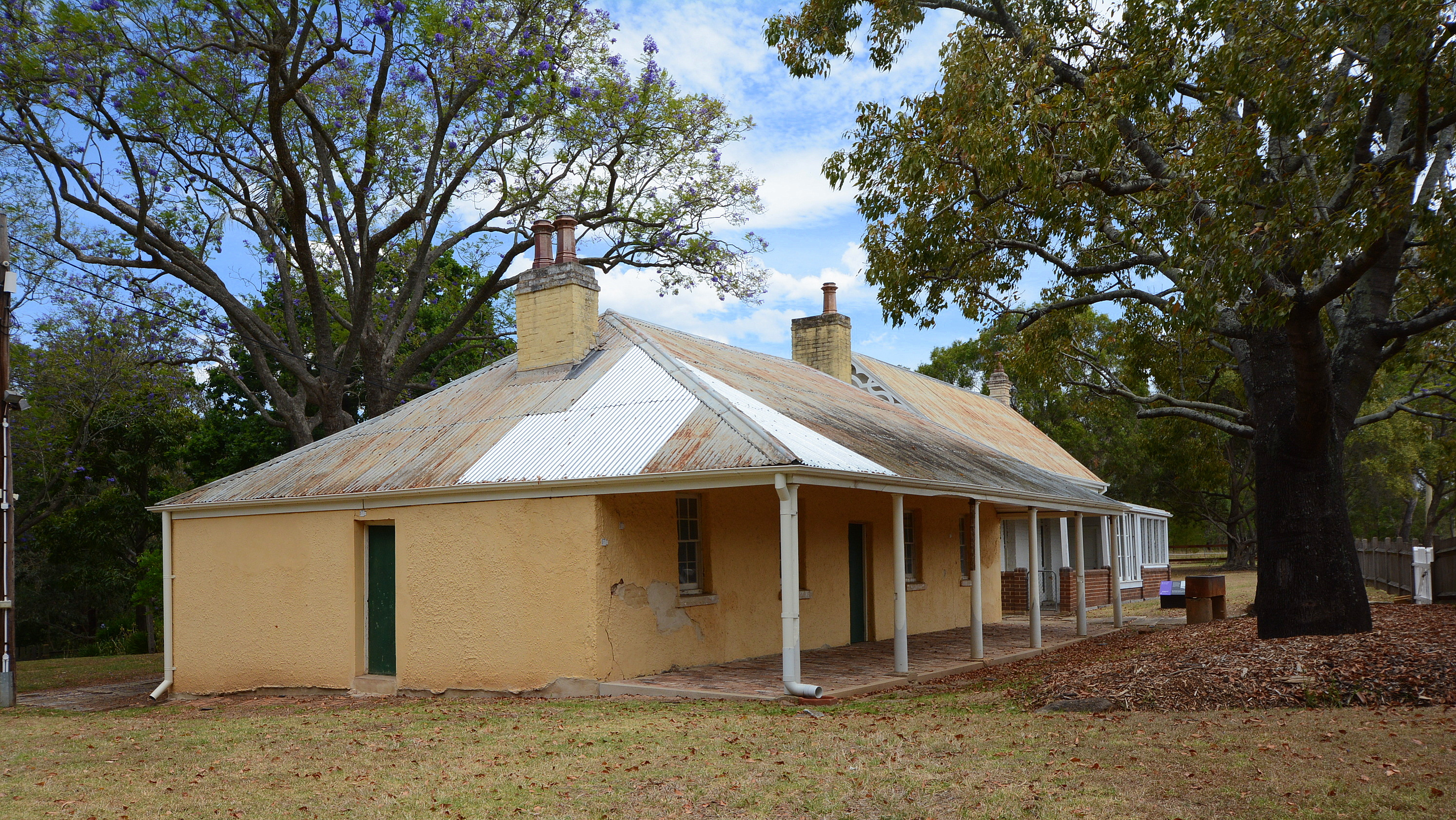
Dairy Cottage after restoration

Today the cottage has been fully restored. The building itself, along with the ranger's cottage adjacent have recently been opened.
