= Goldfinders Inn =

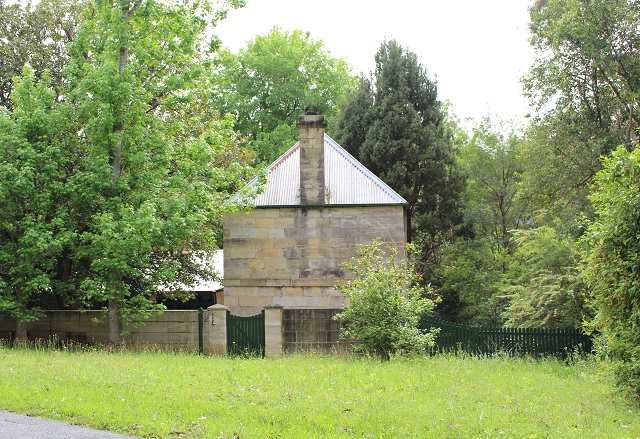
- View of Goldfinders Inn, from the road

- Location within New South Wales Location within Australia
- 33.5490°S 150.6614°E
- Location: 164 Old Bells Line of Road, Kurrajong, City of Hawkesbury, New South Wales, Australia

History
- Built: 1809–1830

New South Wales Heritage Register
- Official name: Goldfinders Inn Group; Gold Finders Rest; Kurrajong General Store; Kurrajong Post Office
- Type: state heritage (built)
- Designated: 21 October 2016
- Reference no.: 1978
- Type: Other – Residential Buildings (private)
- Category: Residential buildings (private)
- Builders: John Lamrock

Goldfinders Inn is a heritage-listed former inn ans guesthouse, located on the urban fringe of Sydney, Australia. The property, 164 Old Bells Line of Road, Kurrajong, New South Wales has also seen historical use as a general store and a post office, and is now a private residence. It was built from 1809 to 1830 by John Lamrock. It was added to the New South Wales State Heritage Register on 21 October 2016., with the listing including the alternative names Gold Finders Rest, Kurrajong General Store and Kurrajong Post Office.

== History ==
Rowland Edwards arrived in Sydney in the colony of NSW in 1791 as a convict transported for seven years on the Third Fleet. By 1798 Edwards was believed to be an emancipated convict occupying the "lowlands" at the junction of the Hawkesbury River and Rickaby's Creek, near present day Windsor. The 1806 General Muster lists Edwards "free by servitude" and now a settler having purchased 80 acres at Richmond Hill, of which 50 acres were under cultivation and pasture and 30 acres fallow. The occupants of the land were Edwards, his wife and child and an assigned convict. They were noted not to be on Government stores and so it can be assumed they were self-sufficient on their 80 acres. Edwards was not formally granted the land until 1809 by Colonel William Paterson. He was, however, clearly in occupation three years earlier and his self-sufficiency indicates a dwelling on the land grant as early as 1806. His relocation with his family to "Richmond Hill" on higher land is confirmed by documentary evidence with the grant from Governor Paterson, dated 14 December 1809. Three months before the formal land grant of 1809, Edwards sold stock at public auction (possibly to settle debts) from his property on the High Lands at Richmond Hill.

While Richmond Hill was a general term for land north-west of the Hawkesbury River, the High Lands was a more specific reference to the present Kurrajong area. Thus Edwards was in residence at the site of the Goldfinders Inn at least by 1809. Edwards may have constructed the oldest part of the cottage at this time. The earliest fabric evidence is not incompatible with this date.

In 1823 Archibald Bell Jr. surveyed the present Old Bells Line of Road. It was a traditional Aboriginal route shown to Bell by Darug guides Emery and Cogy when they led him over Mount Tomah and on to Hartley Vale. The road was under construction by 1825 and was officially opened in 1841. The timber cottage at Goldfinders is of locally sourced material and of a rough vernacular construction, consistent with an absence of navigable road for transporting materials. It is probable that the earliest fabric of the cottage was constructed prior to 1840.

The Edwards family appears to have been occupying the site until c. 1842, when it was sold to John Rule. Rule sold the property to John Lamrock c. 1850. Lamrock constructed a two-storey sandstone inn in c. 1850 and licensed it as the "Goldfinders Home", catering to diggers travelling to and from the western goldfields. It became the centre of the local community, operating as a general store and post office. Various public meetings were reported to be held on the site. After the inn licence was not renewed in 1871, it continued to operate as a post office, general store and guesthouse. Contemporary newspaper articles comment on the writers' stays at the property. The guesthouse operation included both buildings, with various extensions to these buildings made, but since demolished.

The third owners of the property were Henry and Robert Pitt, from a family that had resided in the Hawkesbury for many years. After Henry's death, it was eventually sold to James Pye in 1922. He operated a local business as a blacksmith. During his ownership, up until 1944, the property continued to be used as a general store and post office and for community gatherings. The Post Office was relocated prior to its sale in 1944.

Goldfinders Inn has had a series of owners since 1944, including (1972-5) Padraic Pearce "Paddy" McGuinness, journalist and commentator. It was purchased by the current (2015) owners Chris and Deborah Hallam in 1975. Deborah Hallam (Pitt) is a direct descendant of Henry Pitt, a previous owner (1899-1908).

Conservation planning for the cottage was undertaken by Graham Edds & Associates. Works to the cottage were carried out in 1987. Conservation and adaptation works to the inn building, undertaken in 1979, were designed by Philip Cox and Partners. An addition linking the two buildings was completed in 2010.

== Description ==
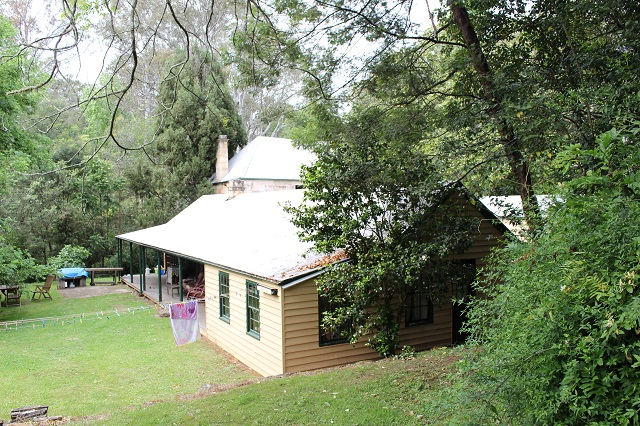
Cottage

The Goldfinders Inn Group comprises three buildings located at the southern end of the site, near the junction of Bells Line of Road with Little Wheeny Creek. The buildings are a single storey timber cottage, a two-storey, sandstone building constructed as an inn and a timber barn structure. They are set in a garden of mature trees.

The earliest fabric of the cottage is estimated to date from the 1820s, though it may be as early as 1809 (the year of the land grant) but no later than 1850 (prior to construction of the inn). The walls are part timber slab and part broad-axed stud frame with sandstone rubble nogging between studs and clad in horizontal splayed weatherboards. The roof framing is of broad-axed rafters and pit-sawn flitch timbers. They are fixed to the wall plate with timber pegs in some parts and with nails in others. Corrugated metal cladding has been laid over the original timber shingles.

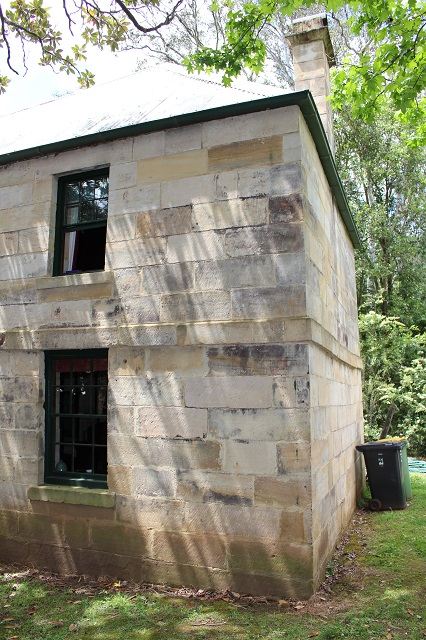
Inn building

The two-storey sandstone inn building is constructed of ashlar blocks with a corrugated metal roof replacing the original timber shingles. Additions made to facilitate its use as a general store and Post Office have subsequently been demolished. The original internal layout is evident in the remaining fabric.

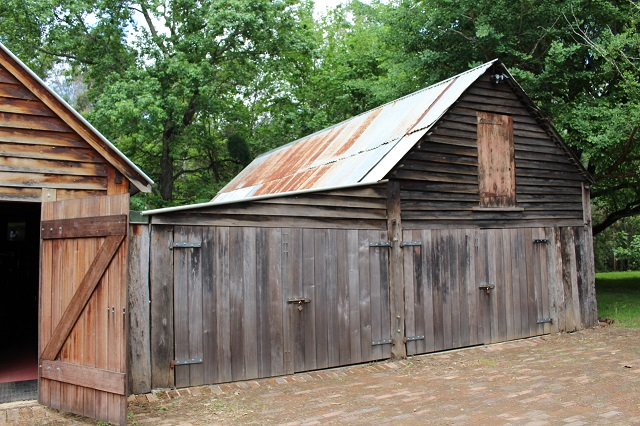
Barn

A barn of vertical slab construction has been extended with new and recycled slabs. The garden located between the inn and cottage is dominated by a large, mature magnolia (Magnolia grandiflora) and two large camellias (Camellia japonica "Variegata" and Camellia japonica 'Triumphans'). The "Triumphans" camellia was identified as the oldest in Australia by Professor Eben Gowrie Waterhouse, eminent camellia authority. Photographic evidence suggests that the magnolia and camellias may date from the 1850s.

=== Condition ===
The condition of all three buildings was reported as good as at 23 July 2013. Conservation works undertaken on the cottage in 1987 included weatherproofing the building and some renewal of fabric. Conservation works undertaken on the inn building in 1979 involved weatherproofing and reconstruction of a portion of the wall. The ground level floor was reconstructed and minor adaptation works also carried out at this time, with some replacement of fabric.

While the buildings have undergone conservation and adaptation works, including removal of later additions, construction of a new addition and the replacement of some fabric, they retain a high level of intactness. The form of the structures, the significant internal configurations and the patina of original fabric are readily discernible.

=== Modifications and dates ===
Cottage

- c. 1809: Original part of cottage constructed.
- c. 1820–1900: Various extensions to cottage, as set out in Figures 58 and 59 of attached report.
- 1987–88: demolition of part of eastern face, retaining verandah plus one room at north-east corner.
- 2010: Construction of infill room between cottage and inn.

Inn

- c. 1850: constructed
- 1870–1920: Addition of ground level "shop front" to western side for use as a general store and post office.
- Early 20th century: addition of first floor verandah on south-east side, and skillion roof at ground level on northern side.
- Mid 20th century: removal of northern skillion and western shop front.
- 1979: removal of first floor verandah, as part of major conservation and building repair works.

== Heritage listing ==
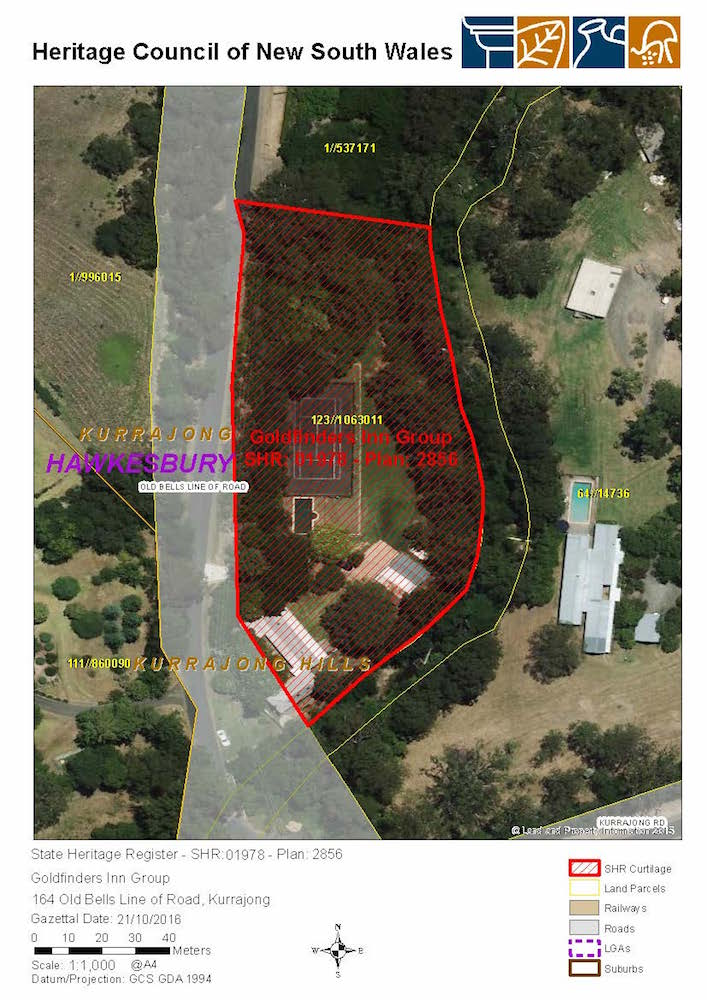
Heritage boundaries

The Goldfinders Inn site is of state significance as a continually inhabited place of residence in the Hawkesbury area from the time of the land grant in 1809 to the present day. The cottage, inn and barn together provide physical evidence of successive occupancies and uses of the site initially for farming, through to commercial use as an inn and licensed premises, later a post office and general store and as private residence.

The development and functions of the site are integrally related to the development of Bells Line of Road. The Goldfinders Inn Group served as a wayside inn on the long road journeys through the mountains.

The cottage is an early dwelling of the Hawkesbury settlement that may date from as early as 1809. It is a rare pre-1840s vernacular building, providing evidence of in-ground timber slab construction, broad-axed stud frame with stone-nogging infill and later phases of stud frame construction. The stone-nog (sandstone block and rubble infill between studs) is a rare construction method, reflecting the remote location of the site in the use of locally sourced material.

The site is also rare for its early domestic plantings of magnolias and camellias. The main camellia featured in the garden was described by Professor EJ Waterhouse as the oldest in Australia.

The Goldfinders Inn Group has the potential to yield further information on the construction of early vernacular buildings, particularly in relation to the unusual stone nog infill between wall studs. There is also some potential for the site to reveal evidence of former buildings related to documented uses of the place.

Goldfinders Inn was listed on the New South Wales State Heritage Register on 21 October 2016 having satisfied the following criteria.

The place is important in demonstrating the course, or pattern, of cultural or natural history in New South Wales.

Goldfinders Inn Group is of state heritage significance as the cottage is evidence of an early vernacular dwelling of the Hawkesbury settlement that predates the c. 1850 inn building and may date from as early as 1809.

The property has functioned as a continually inhabited place of residence from 1806 to the present day, serving one of the oldest established settlements of NSW.

The cottage, inn and barn together provide physical evidence of successive occupancies and uses of the site initially for farming, through mid-nineteenth century more intense settlement and cultivation, commercial use as an inn and licensed premises, later a post office and general store and as private residence. The development of the site is integrally related to the development of Bells Line of Road. The siting of the buildings at the crossing of the road and creek took advantage of passing traffic for business and, in turn, served the development of the road by offering refreshment and rest on a long road journey as a wayside inn. In its operation as a licensed inn, with associated general store and Post Office, the Goldfinders Inn Group has been the centre of Kurrajong community activities, prior to a formal village being constructed.

The garden plantings of camellias and magnolias are of historic interest in their own right, with the main camellia described by Professor EJ Waterhouse as the oldest in Australia.

The place has potential to yield information that will contribute to an understanding of the cultural or natural history of New South Wales.

The Goldfinders Inn Group is of state significance because the cottage on the site is an early dwelling which has the potential to yield further information on the construction of early vernacular buildings, particularly in relation to the unusual stone nog infill between wall studs. There is also some potential for the site to reveal evidence of former buildings associated with documented uses of the place.

The place possesses uncommon, rare or endangered aspects of the cultural or natural history of New South Wales.

The cottage of the Goldfinders Inn Group is of state significance as a rare pre-1840s cottage with a range of construction systems from its various stages of development, including the use of stone nog infill. The site is also rare for its early domestic plantings and as a dwelling and inn group.

The place is important in demonstrating the principal characteristics of a class of cultural or natural places/environments in New South Wales.

In its evolution from farm to roadside inn, to community hub with associated functions of general store and Post Office, the Goldfinders Inn Group is of state significance as a representative of the pattern of historic development of key locations in small settlements throughout New South Wales.

The form and fabric of the cottage, with its slab construction and portions of stone nog infill, is representative of vernacular building methods of the Old Colonial Period (1788-1840) using locally sourced materials in remote locations.
