= Robert Littlejohn (gardener) =

Scottish gardener and artist (1756–1818)

- Born: 1756; Scotland
- Died: 26 October 1818 (aged 61–62); Tasmania
- Occupations: Gardener, botanist, teacher, artist
- Known for: Early free settler in what is now Tasmania, botanist

Montrose House
- Interactive map of the Montrose House area

General information
- Architectural style: Georgian
- Location: 76 Montrose Road, Montrose, Tasmania, Australia
- Coordinates: 42°49′42″S 147°15′28″E
- Construction started: 1813

Tasmanian Heritage Register
- Place ID: 1,624
- Status: Permanently Registered

Robert Littlejohn (1756-1818) was a Scottish gardener, amateur naturalist and an artist who settled in what is now the island state of Tasmania in Australia. In 1813, he built a brick house that he named Montrose House. It is the third oldest residence in Tasmania and is listed on the Tasmanian Heritage Register.

== Personal life ==
Robert Littlejohn was born in Scotland, where he received a liberal education. Littlejohn died on 26 October 1818.

== Tasmania ==
Littlejohn travelled with David Collins on the Ocean from 1803 to 1804, when he arrived at Port Phillip and then River Derwent in Van Diemen's Land (Tasmania). With him was his servant Thomas Littlefield. Littlejohn and Littlefield received land grants upon their arrival. Littlejohn received 100 acres (40 ha) at Miller's Bay, Glenorchy (Prince of Wales Bay) by Governor Philip Gidley King after January 1806, when he was shown to be a successful gardener. He then had a total of 120 acres at Glenorchy, between Humphrey's Rivulet and New Town Creek. (Note: Littlefield also received 100 acres (40 ha) at Stainsforth's Cove (New Town Bay).) He named his land Montrose Estate and in 1813 he built Montrose House, which is the third oldest house in Tasmania. It is permanently listed on the Tasmanian Heritage Register. Littlejohn named his property after a place in Scotland. Built of brick by convicts, the house has Huon pine floors, a Blackwood staircase, Blackwood flooring, and a hand-cut-shingle ceiling in the dining room. It had a workshop and a six-stall stable block. Littlejohn Creek, which runs through Montrose Estate, was named after Littlejohn. The Hobart suburb of Montrose is named after Littlejohn's Montrose Estate.

Littlejohn collected and classified rare indigenous plants. He was considered "a man of wealth of learning and a naturalist of repute," with plants and seeds of the Veronica derwentia littlejohn sent to Robert Brown at the British Museum. Henry Cranke Andrews described the plant in The Botanists Repository for New and Rare Plants. A collection of his seeds were passed to botanist Allan Cunningham, who sent a selection of 44 seeds to William Townsend Aiton at Kew Gardens. (Note: The seeds were given to Lieutenant Governor William Sorell who gave them to Cunningham.)

The Hobart Town Gazette said of him on his death, he had:

devoted a considerable portion of his time to botanical researches, of which he was passionately fond, and collected several rare indigenous plants, which he classed with great industry.

He gained a reputation for his watercolour paintings. Littlejohn taught local children in his house.
