= Longford Railway Bridge =

Heritage listed railway bridge in Tasmania, Australia

Longford railway bridge
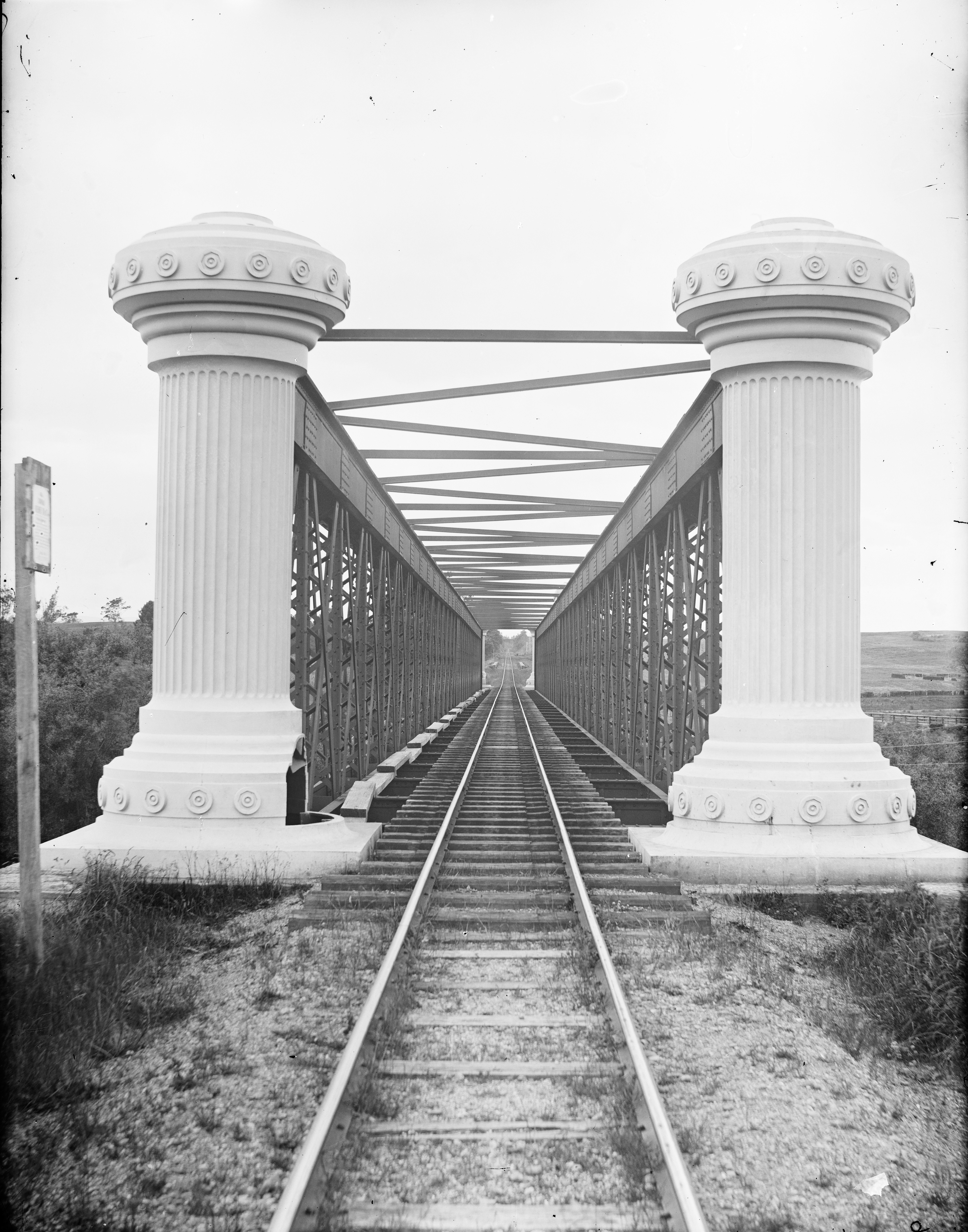
- End of the bridge, between 1870 and 1930
- Coordinates: 41°35′08″S 147°07′29″E
- Carries: Western Line
- Crosses: South Esk River
- Locale: Longford, Tasmania
- Owner: TasRail

Characteristics
- Design: Lattice truss
- Material: Wrought iron
- Total length: 400 feet (121.9 m)
- Longest span: 200 feet (61.0 m)
- No. of spans: 2
- Piers in water: 0
- Clearance above: 2 ft 6 in (76.2 cm) above highest flood level

History
- Engineering design by: Doyne, Major and Willett
- Constructed by: C. de Bergue and Co., London, Manchester, Cardiff, and Wormit.
- Construction end: 1870
- Construction cost: AU£28,000

Location
- Interactive map of Longford railway bridge

The Longford Railway Bridge is a railway bridge spanning the South Esk River, in Longford, Tasmania. The Western Railway Line travels over the bridge, enabling freight movement to/from the major Container ports of Burnie and Devonport and the rest of the state. In 1978, it was listed in the now-defunct Register of the National Estate.

== History and technical details ==
The wrought-iron bridge, with some steel components, was fabricated in the Gwaun-tre-Oda Works Cardiff, Wales and shipped to Australia. It was designed by the Irish-born railway engineer, W.T. Doyne. The bridge cost AU£28,000.

It was opened in 1870 after being load tested for deflection in mid April - for construction purposes - on the railway line from Launceston to Deloraine. Constructed of a through Lattice truss, continuous over two spans of 200 feet (61 m). These were the equal longest spans in an Australian bridge until 1880, (the other was the Barwon Bridge, Geelong), when it was surpassed by the Fitzroy River suspension bridge at Rockhampton.

== Contemporary report ==
From The Cornwall Chronicle, April 23, 1870:

"The Longford iron bridge has been constructed and erected under contract by Mr. C. de Bergue from designs prepared by the company's engineers, Messrs. Doyne, Major, and Willett. It is on the principle known as the double Warren girder, and consists of two spans, each of 200 feet (61.0 m). The girder is continuous, fixed in the centre but expanding and contracting at both ends, upon an apparatus invented by Mr. Doyne. The girders are of lattice work, formed by building at top and bottom, strings of plate iron 2 ft 9 in (84 cm) wide on the bottom, and 2 ft 9 in (84 cm) deep. These are connected together by vertical and diagonal bars, the vertical bars being placed 14 ft (4.3 m) apart, and the diagonals crossed between these. The size of each of these bars is arranged according to its position in the bridge, and in exact proportion to the amount of work it is to perform, a much smaller bar being used in the centre than at the ends of each span. The top and bottom strings, on the contrary are much stronger in the centre than at the ends. The space between the upper and lower strings is 19 feet (5.8 m). The two main girders are connected together by cross girders at every 14 feet (4.3 m), and upon these are rivetted the beams which carry the permanent rails. The cross girders are rivetted to the sides of the lower strings, and the top strings arc connected by strong angle irons, thus giving great stability to the whole structure, which represents, in section, a square of 20 feet (6.1 m). A feature in this Bridge is the fact that the rivet holes instead of being punched as is the ordinary process, have all been drilled as true as a gun barrel; the consequence being that not a single hole required alteration, even where two or three plates had to be bolted together. The rivets were all made to fit the holes cold, and as they were put in at a red heat, and driven up by means of a circular steel cap, they all fit- as tight as though the holes had been rammed with some soft substance. Hence the extreme rigidity and elasticity of the structure. The ends of the bridge are to be set off by four massive fluted columns of cast iron, having handsome basements, and relieved by ornamental capitals, and over the centre also is a massive ornamental casting, which will agreeably break the line and relieve the appearance of the structure. These are the only pieces of ornamentation in which the engineers have indulged. The height of the bridge and of the viaduct immediately beyond were both deter mined after a careful survey of the country and the most minute enquiries respecting the various flood levels. The bridge is now 2 feet 6 inches (76 cm) clear above the level of the highest recorded flood, and as it offers no impediment whatever to the passage of the waters, it is regarded almost as an everlasting structure. The abutments and centre pier are not yet quite complete, inasmuch as they have to be built up to the sides of the bridge, but the brick work and masonry of which they are composed, is very massive. They are sixteen feet thick, and stand upon a foundation of stiff clay. We are informed that a bed of cement concrete was laid 1 ft 6 in (46 cm) thick, upon which the brickwork was commenced. The average depth of the concrete bed from the surface of the ground is 26 feet (7.9 m), so that the foundations are imbedded 27 feet (8.2 m) or more below the river level. The abutments and piers are composed of brick, with ponderous blocks of hard blue stone, dove-tailed together under the girders, with quoins, caps, and copings of freestone quarried in the immediate neighbourhood, of the quality of which the engineers speak very highly. We have referred above to an apparatus invented by Mr. Doyne, the object of which is to supply a means of compensation for the expansion or contraction in the length of long iron girders, produced by variations of temperature; and also to remove the pounding of the girder upon its support, caused by the uudulatory motion produced in the girder by the passage of a heavy load. This has hitherto been effected by means more or less imperfect, and it is believed that this invention will prove a great improvement upon those which have hitherto been in use. The apparatus consists of a cast-iron circular plate seven feet in diameter and four inches in thickness, which rests on the top of the abutment. From the upper surface of this plate, five vertical ribs or jaws project upwards to the height of one foot nine inches. They are three inches in thickness and ten inches apart, running along the plate, in the direction of the girder, for its whole diameter. The upper edges of these ribs are grooved across the line of the girder, and in these grooves there rests a cast-steel turned pin 5 feet (1.5 m) long, and three inches in diameter. From this pin two steel links depend between each pair of ribs, making eight in number : they are three inches square, and are furnished with eyes at each end three inches in diameter, and bushed with brass. They are 16 inches (41 cm) long from centre to centre of the eyes, and hang nearly touching the ribs on one side, and leaving a space of nearly three inches between them on the other. This completes the description of the lower or abutment member of the apparatus. The upper girder member is nearly similar, but inverted; its plate, instead of being circular, is oblong. The ribs are four in number, and project downwards. They are placed between the links with the grooves opposite to the eyes. Through these, and through the eyes, a steel pin similar to the one described passes. Thus, the lower portion of the upper member is suspended from the upper portion of the lower member. The girder rests upon the iron plate, and as it increases or diminishes in length, through changes of temperature, it pushes forward or draws backward the whole upper member, causing it to swing freely on the suspending links, as if it rested on the tray of an ordinary swing. There is also a third motion, which takes place in the girders, which must be provided for in the bearings on the abutments, or serious vibration is produced. It is the undulatory or wave motion, produced by the changing deflections of the girders under the action of a moving load, which causes the ends of the girders to rock on their bearings. This motion is also perfectly provided for by Mr Doyne's apparatus, as the plate, on which the girder rests rolls freely on the lower pin, and thus destroys all pounding action on the abutment plate. It will be seen that when longitudinal expansion or contraction takes place in the girder, the lower pin moves forwards and backwards through the ribs of the lower member, and consequently the holes in these arc so formed as to give free play to this motion; they are of a radial oblong form, which has been termed "balanoidal," or bean-shaped."

== See also ==
- Rail transport in Tasmania
