= Ingle Hall =

Heritage building in Hobart, Tasmania, Australia

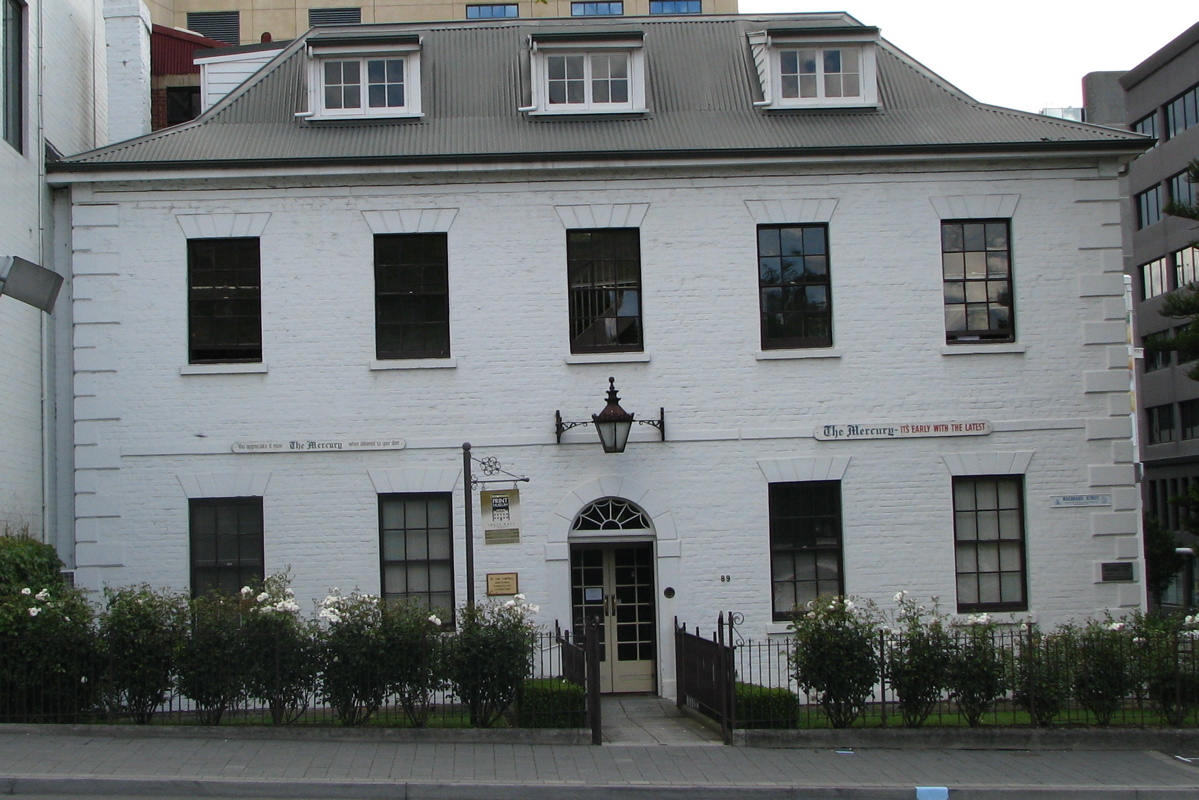
- Ingle Hall, 2007
- Interactive map of the Ingle Hall area

General information
- Architectural style: Georgian
- Location: 89 Macquarie St, Hobart Tas. Corner of Macquarie St and Argyle Street, Hobart, Tasmania, Australia
- Coordinates: 42°52′55″S 147°19′51″E
- Construction started: 1812–1814

Technical details
- Material: Brick

Ingle Hall is a landmark building in Hobart, Tasmania on the corner of Macquarie and Argyle Streets. It has served numerous purposes over its history and is vacant; it was most recently used as The Mercury print museum. It is unknown when the building was built as it predates any government record holding by the state of Tasmania, which began in 1822. It is named for John Ingle, one of the two possible first inhabitants of the building.

It was listed on the Register of the National Estate until that list was archived in 2007, and is on the Tasmanian Heritage Register. It is alleged to be the oldest building in Hobart (and therefore Tasmania), but this is not proven.

== History ==
The hall wasn't named until the late 19th century, referred to simply by its location before that time. It was either built by John Ingle or Edward Lord (grazier), brother of Sir John Owen, 1st Baronet, as a warehouse and first occupied in either 1811 or 1814. Several conservation studies have concluded it is most likely Edward Lord built it, and later sold it to John Ingle. It was brought by Roland Warpole Loane sometime in 1814. It was used as a general store 1818–1822, a business after that and then from 1826 it became the Leek Inn for three years. 1846 it was the first location of The Hutchins School for three years, until their own building was built further up Macquarie Street. It has also been the Tasmanian Coffee Palace, a boarding house and a private residence.

It was bought by the government of Tasmania in 1949, with plans to demolish the building despite widespread criticism at the time. This never happened.
