= Dora Turner =

Australian educator (1888–1953)

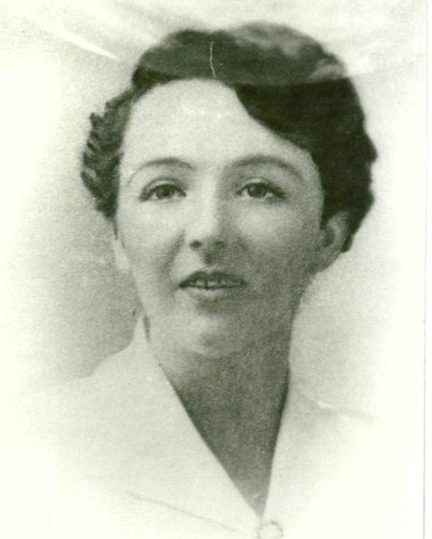
- Born: Dora Jeannette Turner; 8 January 1888; Cape Portland
- Died: 12 October 1953 (aged 65); Hobart
- Education: Hobart Teacher Training College
- Occupation: teacher
- Employer: Tasmanian Department of Education
- Known for: founding teacher-in-charge of the Girls' Welfare School

Dora Jeannette Turner was born at Cape Portland in Tasmania in 1888. She became an educationist associated with Tasmania's first special school that was later renamed to be the Dora Turner School.

== Life ==
Turner was born in 1888. Her parents were Mary Louisa (born Ikin) and her husband George Arthur Turner who worked in a bank. Turner's education was at Devonport Primary school (that is still in operation) and Launceston High School. She worked as an assisted teacher until she gained her own certificate at Hobart Teachers' Training College in 1909. She then worked at several different primary schools.

In 1924 she came to notice when she was appointed as an experienced primary teacher to lead the new Girls' Welfare School. The school had eight female pupils who had been identified as benefitting from a special education by the Tasmanian Department of Education. The school had one classroom and a kitchen and it had been provided at the instigation of the education department's school psychologist, H.T.Parker. However the history of the school is considered to be strongly linked to Turner's career. The girls were aged between twelve and sixteen and were said to be "backward and feeble minded". The girls learned primarily about domestic science and there was no stated attempt to made them independent, but Turner was noted for emphasising self-reliance.

By 1930 there were 22 girls in the school which had moved to Mather House in Murray Street in Hobart. Mather house had two floors and on the upper floor Dora lived with her sister Mary who was also a teacher.

She retired in 1951 and died in 1953. In December 1954 after thirty years of operation the Girls' Welfare School was renamed the Dora Turner School. It was announced by a former director of the Tasmanian Department of Education, G.V.Brooks, and a portrait of Turner was placed in the school in recognition of her role in starting the school for "educatable retarded" pupils. In 1955 the school became co-educational. Its building in Hampden Road was destroyed by a fire in 1970 but the Dora Turner School had moved to new premises in 1969.
