= Garrison Church, Sydney =

The Garrison Church
- Holy Trinity Millers Point
- Holy Trinity Anglican Church
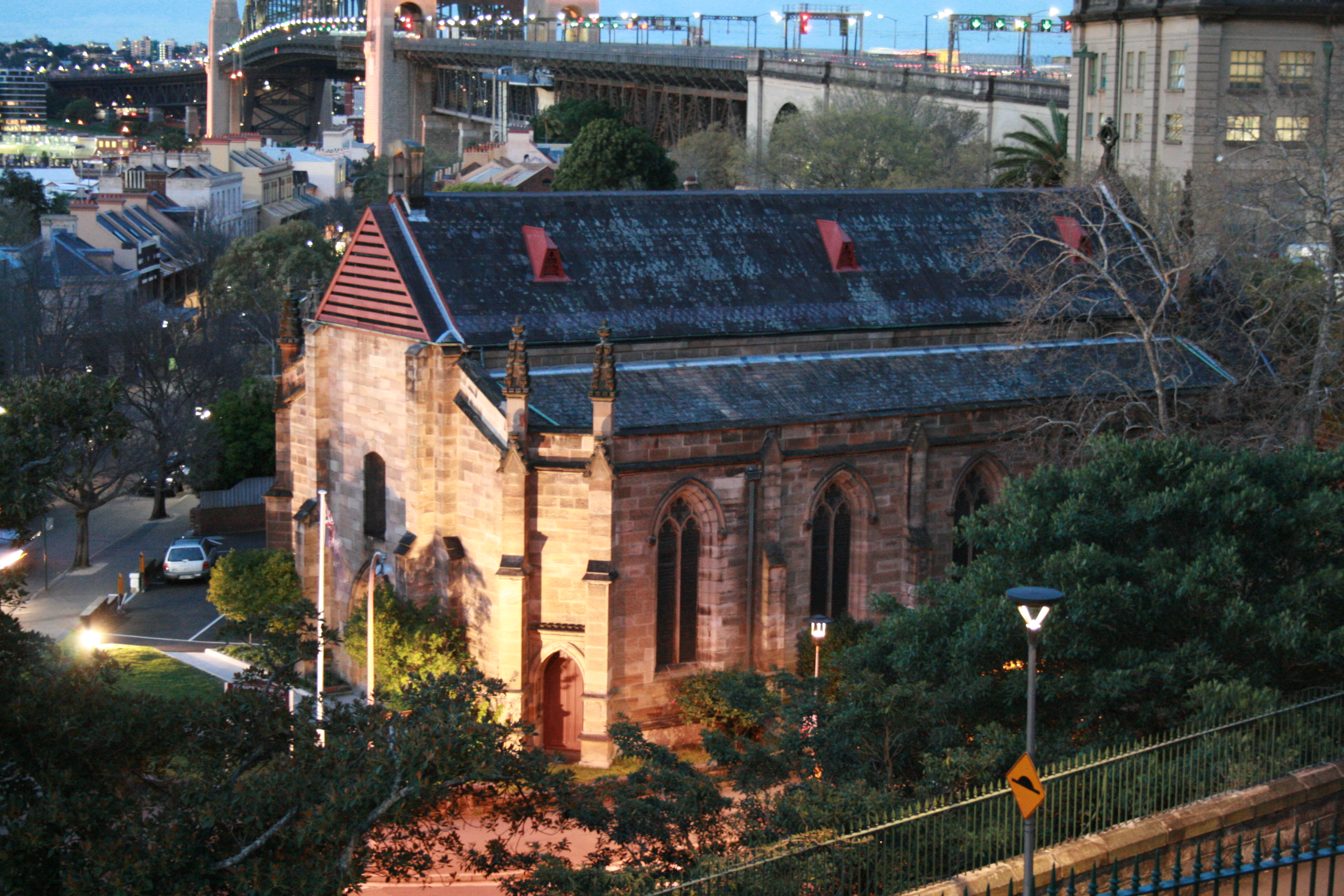
- The Garrison Church from Observatory Hill

- Location in Sydney central business district
- 33°51′29″S 151°12′21″E
- Location: Argyle Street, Millers Point, City of Sydney, New South Wales
- Country: Australia
- Denomination: Anglican
- Website: churchhillanglican.com/visit-us#location2

History
- Status: Church
- Founded: 23 June 1840
- Founder: Bishop William Broughton
- Consecrated: 2000

Architecture
- Functional status: Active
- Architects: Henry Ginn (1st stage); Edmund Blacket (2nd stage)
- Years built: 1840–1846

Administration
- Diocese: Sydney
- Parish: Church Hill Anglican

Clergy
- Rector: Rev. Justin Moffatt
- Priest: Rev. Dr. Thomas Elms

New South Wales Heritage Register
- Official name: Garrison Anglican Church Precinct; Holy Trinity Anglican Church and Hall; Drill Hall; Garrison Church
- Type: State heritage (complex / group)
- Designated: 2 April 1999
- Reference no.: 644
- Type: Church
- Category: Religion
- Builders: Edward Flood & George Patton

The Garrison Church is a heritage-listed active Anglican church building located at Argyle Street in the inner city Sydney on the edge of the suburb of Millers Point in the City of Sydney local government area of New South Wales, Australia. It was designed by Henry Ginn (1st stage), Edmund Blacket (2nd stage) and built from 1840 to 1846 by Edward Flood and George Patton. It is also known as Holy Trinity Anglican Church and Hall. The property is owned by Anglican Church Property Trust and was added to the New South Wales State Heritage Register on 2 April 1999.

The Garrison Church is the first military church built in colonial Australia. It remains an active Anglican church, and since 1 November 2013 has operated in a joint parish with St Philip's Church, part of the Diocese of Sydney.

== History ==
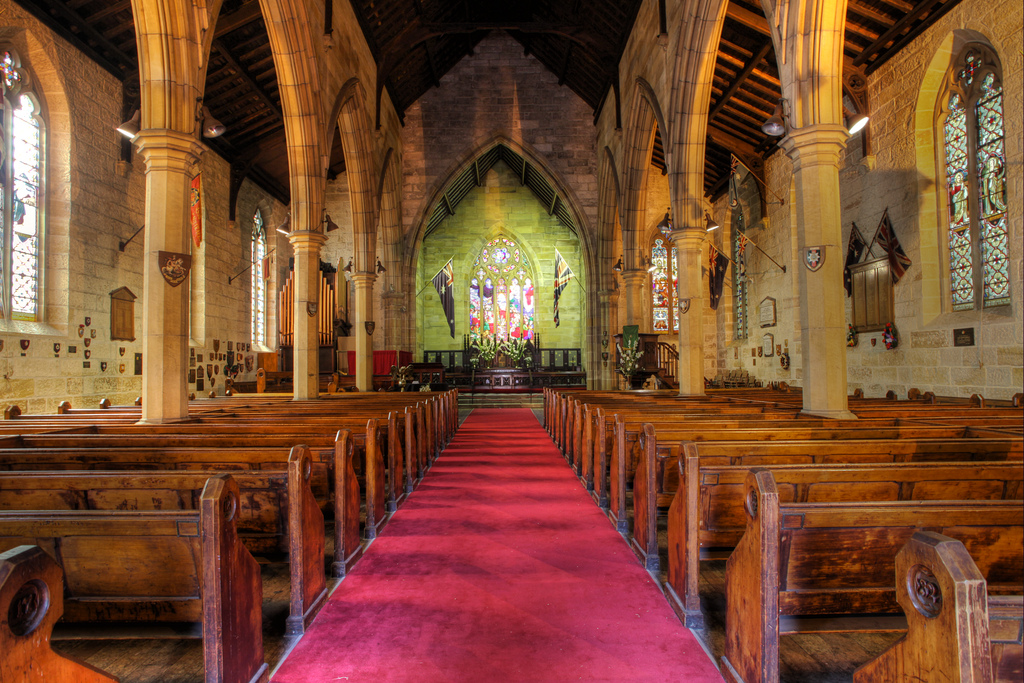
The Garrison Church interior

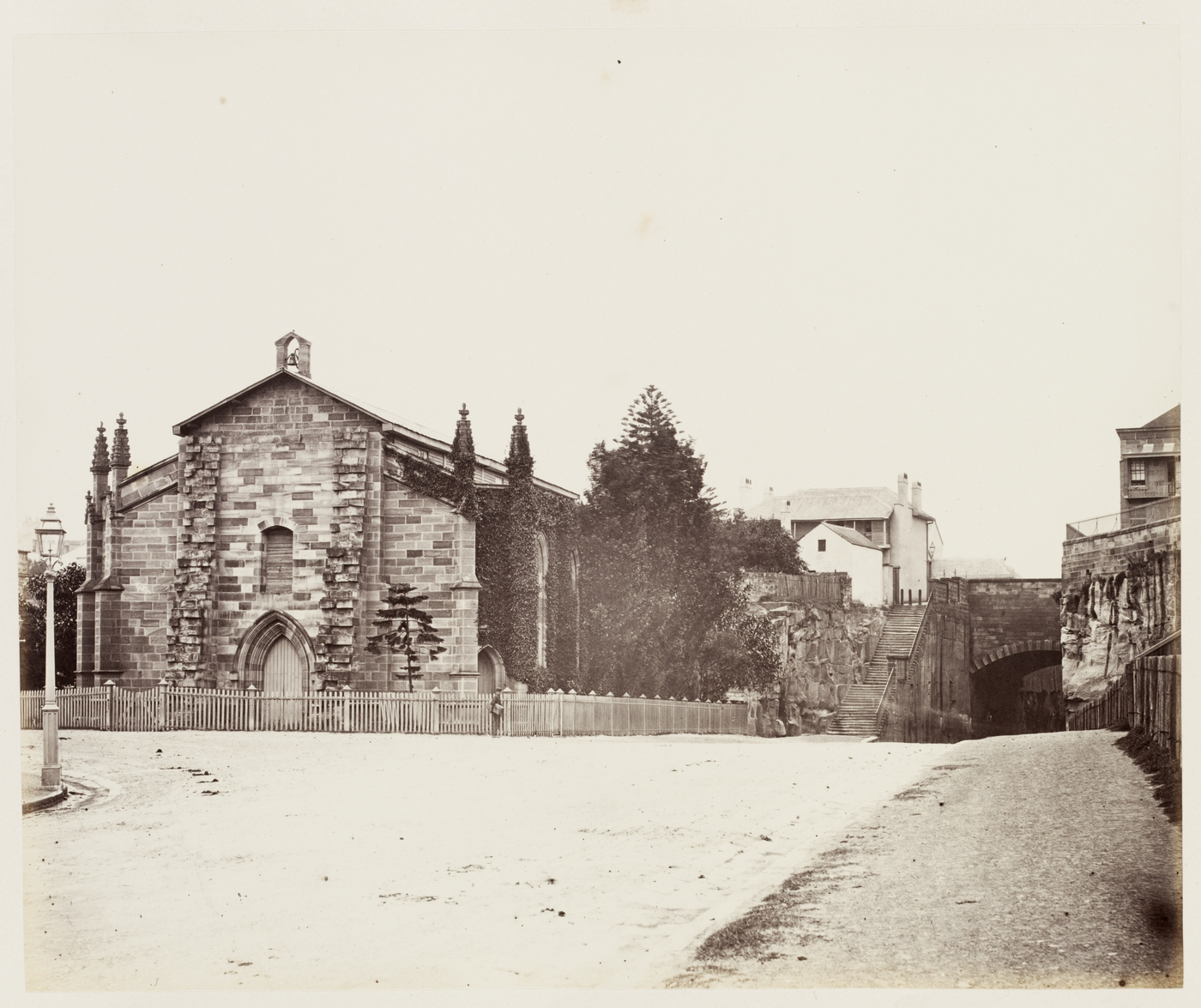
Holy Trinity exterior in 1872

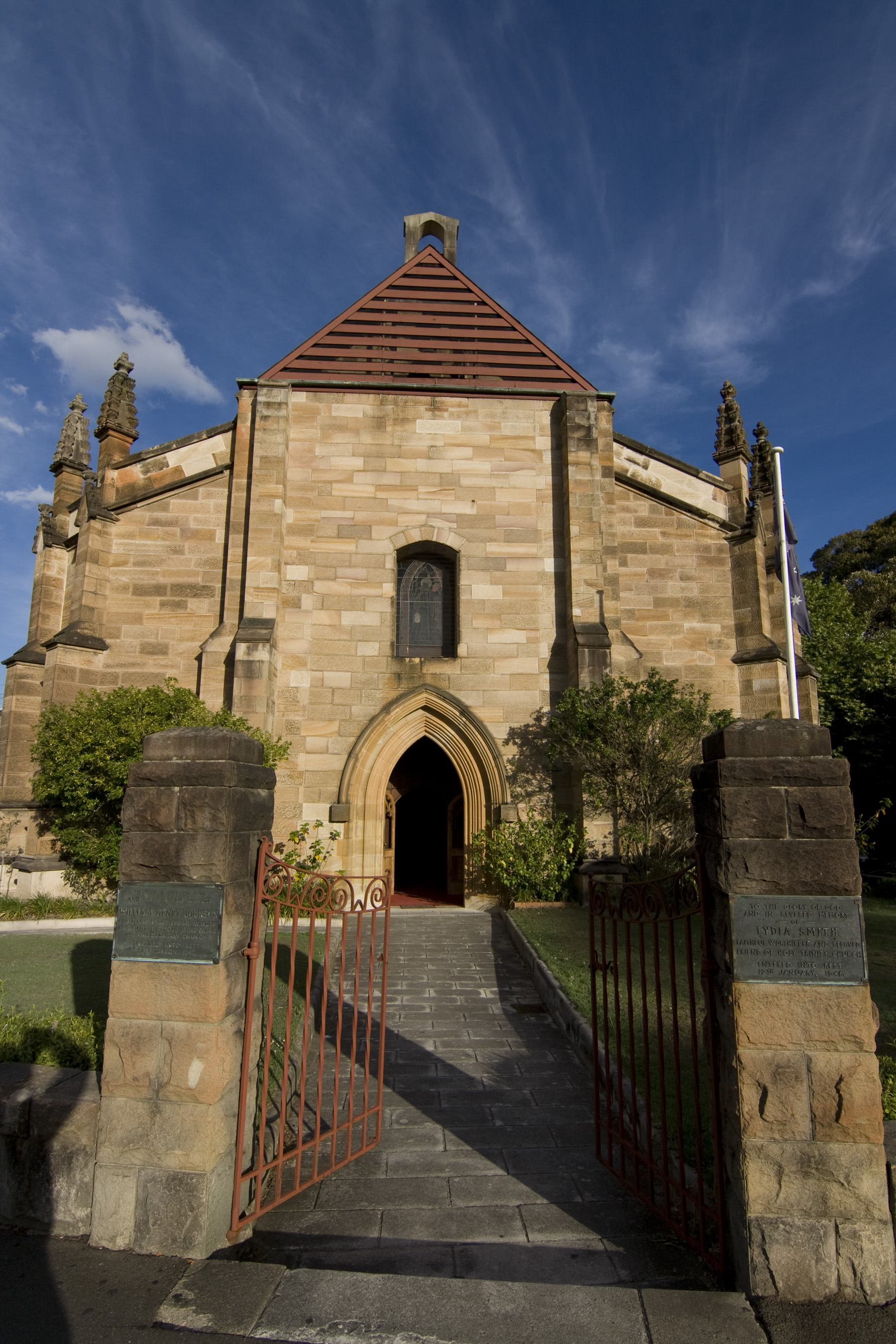
The Garrison Church exterior

Despite the proximity of Miller's Point to The Rocks and the initial settlement of Sydney, the inaccessibility of Miller's Point meant it was not settled until 1810s. Industry began in the 1820s with windmills on the high ground and then extended into commercial maritime facilities, which took advantage of the deep foreshore. From the 1830s onwards the commercial activities led to the development of residences for middle-class merchants and professionals.

The first church in Sydney was St Philip's Church, established in 1797 and completed in 1810, before the large-scale commercial development of the area. The maritime activities bought an influx of parishioners that the church could not physically contain. Seating capacity at St Philip's Church had been outgrown by the congregation. A solution was the establishment of the parish of Holy Trinity. The Garrison Church was planned at a meeting convened by Reverend William Cowper on 23 December 1839 when a resolution passed to petition Governor Major Sir George Gipps for the establishment of the parish. Gipps granted approval in January 1840 and Henry Ginn was immediately engaged to draw up plans for the new church.

Cowper made a significant contribution to funding the church, stipulating that it be named "The Holy Trinity". The foundation stone was laid by Bishop William Broughton on 23 June 1840. At the foundation service The Sydney Morning Herald reported that Broughton concluded his address "expressing his belief that those present would not only avail themselves of the building about to be erected for perpetuating the true worship of the true God, but also expressing his fervent wishes that the building might for generations be devoted to the purposes for which it was to be constructed." The Garrison Church was one of nine or ten churches under construction at the time, projects considered by The Sydney Morning Herald at the time to "clearly prove ... still Religion and Morality are rapidly advancing amongst us".

This Foundation stone of a Church in Honour of the Holy Trinity, erected with the aid of Her Majesty's Government, by the Inhabitants of the Parish of Saint Phillip in the Town of Sydney, and Colony of New South Wales, was laid by the Right Reverend Father in God, William, Lord Bishop of Australia, on the XXIII Day of June, in the year of our Lord MDCCCXL, the IV year of the Reign of Queen Victoria, and the LIII of the Colony, Sir George Gipps, Knight, being Governor. The Bishop of Australia, Trustee; the Rev William Cowper, chaplain of St Phillips, Major George Barney, commanding Royal Engineers, Robert Campbell junior, merchant, acting Committee for the Building.

— Bronze plaque inside the foundation stone, location unknown.

Building continued slowly due to the depression of the 1840s. In 1844 Broughton gave Rev. John Couch Grylls a licence to conduct services in the partially completed building. The first service was held on Whitsunday in 1844. It was hoped the arrangement would be short-lived and the Church could be consecrated, however this did not occur until 2000. Grylls was appointed and licensed soon after, on a salary of £500 (including £200 from the Government) and died in 1854. The parishioners began looking at completing the building works to the Church. A building committee was established in 1855 and engaged Edmund Blacket to prepare plans, which included a tower and spire. Blacket's plans were adopted on a reduced scale, but work was not completed until 1878.

The church was the official Garrison church for the imperial troops at Dawes Point Battery until they were withdrawn from Sydney in 1870. A small adjoining hall was used as a school, and for a time was the headquarters of the 30th Scottish Battalion, which continued its relationship with the church at anniversaries. The church held a collection of military items dating back to the early years of the Colony and these were displayed in the hall which operated as a military museum for some thirty years. The museum was run by Myra Demetriou, who was assisted by other volunteers, many of whom were drawn from the military who attended commemorative services at the church. The museum closed when Myra's eyesight failed and the collection was dispersed.

For several years the Garrison Church was the "parish church" of Government House.

The demographic of the area, containing mainly middle-class merchants and professionals, made Holy Trinity a wealthy parish and on the completion of the building works, the parish remained stable until 1890s. The depression of the 1890s together with the rise of territorial gangs in the area and the Bubonic plague had a negative impact on the parish and it went into decline. By the 1930s the Government resumptions, World War I and the Great Depression had changed the demographic to a poorer, working-class neighbourhood with fewer Anglicans. There was no resident minister, but the Church continued with services, Sunday School and a Mothers' Union. In 1938 the Church decided not to continue with the dream of completing the tower and spire, instead turning the fund over to fixing the church and hall. During World War II the hall was used as a Church of England National Emergency Fund hostel for servicemen, a function that continued into the 1950s.

The first history of the Church was written in 1940 to commemorate the centenary of laying the foundation stone. Rev. Archibald W. Morton wrote the history and included a list of English regiments "who worshiped here during the period the Church was used by the Garrison Forces". This was the first link between the Church and the Garrison and as a result, in 1952, the military insignia of the forces were dedicated in the nave and the Church renamed Holy Trinity Garrison Church. Holy Trinity, however, was not a place of worship for the Garrison - St Philip had been before the construction of Victoria Barracks.

The Church continued to minister to the troops at the Dawes Battery and other military associations included regular attendance by a squad from the Naval Volunteer Artillery at morning services. During the early 20th century Charles Rosenthal, a member of the parish, was a part-time commissioned officer serving with the Australian Garrison Artillery and seems to have established a connection between the two. The erection of a drill hall for the 30th Battalion, NSW Scottish Regiment in 1916 on Lower Fort Street led to an association with the Royal NSW Regiment.

On the 1st of November 2013 the Garrison Church merged with St Philip's, York Street to form the Anglican Parish of Church Hill.

== Description ==
The Garrison Anglican Church is located at the intersection of Argyle Street and Lower Fort Street, Millers Point. The church is situated to the east of the Argyle Place public reserve and is north of the Observatory Hill public reserve. The church is surrounded by houses and terraces from the Georgian and Victorian periods. The site includes the church, parish hall and is defined by the "village square" of Argyle Place public reserve that encompasses; historic residences to the north, mid-nineteenth and early twentieth century residences in Lower Fort Street, including the rectory, commercial premises and the former Army Drill Hall. Included in the church precinct is a rectory, commercial premises, a former army drill hall, and parish hall. 50, 52, 54 and 56 Lower Fort Street are early twentieth century residences.

=== Church ===
The rear of Holy Trinity Anglican Church is defined by an irregularly formed public right of way known as Trinity Avenue. The church was constructed from locally quarried sandstone and contains a wide nave with aisles and chancel and vestry on the east end, which is the oldest portion of the church. Externally the nave comprises a series of buttresses and five windows with stone tracery, label moulds and carved foliage bosses on each of the south and north elevations. There exists a single large window on west elevation, one window on the southwest wall. The western and eastern buttresses are carried up in elegant carved stone pinnacles. The gable roof is clad in slate with six timber and iron ventilators. The west gable apex is surmounted by a stone carving of the holy cross and the east apex has a stone belfry. A panel of the west gable has been sheeted in timber to cover a bell system installed 1971. The eleven stained glass windows in the aisles primary from the late 1870s.

The church building was designed by Henry Ginn, and built by mason George Payten/Paton and builder Edward Flood. The authorisation was for a north-south building, but it was built east-west. Lighting was installed in 1850 after a special collection for the purpose. Colonial architect Edmund Blacket made some enhancements to the building in the period 1855-1859, including adding the wine-glass shaped pulpit, and the north-eastern vestry. The design included a tower at the west end, which although it received support in a split vote in 1887, was never built, and the large buttresses built in preparation have since been reduced.

The eastern stained-glass window by C. Clutterbuck was purchased for £100 in 1860, and has corbels in the form of human heads (traditionally thought to be Queen Victoria and Prince Albert). It was installed in the chancel in 1861 by Rose Scott in memory of her parents Helenus and Augusta Maria Scott. It shows scenes representing the Annunciation, the Adoration of the Shepherds, the Baptism of Christ and the Ascension, and has been called "one of the most beautiful windows in Australia".

A window on the south wall is dedicated to Dr James Mitchell and his wife Augusta Mary Mitchell (Helenus Scott's sister), the parents of David Scott Mitchell. Another of the southern windows is dedicated to John Flavelle, a prominent optician and jeweller. Several other windows were presented by James Merriman, after whose family the nearby Merriman Street is named, one of the windows is a memorial to his son. One of the windows on the northern wall is a memorial to William George Summerbell, and another to George Atherden.

Many of the memorials in the church are military related, although in the sanctuary there are also a number of memorials to clergy.

The architecture was considered to be of "mixed Gothic" style. The dimensions are approximately 100 feet (30 m) by 55 feet (17 m), and the height of the walls about 45 feet (14 m). It is constructed with sandstone from the nearby Argyle Cut. The nave has two high arcades formed by five horseshoe arches supported by solid stone columns.

A reconstruction was undertaken in 1878, which included installing arches with a 90 foot (27 m) span resting on four pillars on each side of the church. A renovation and restoration was completed in 1938.

One of the stained glass windows, depicting the Angel of Death sheltering a small child, was the subject of an Australian Christmas stamp in 1984.

=== Modifications and dates ===
A panel of the west gable has been sheeted in timber to cover a bell system installed 1971. The timber sheeting was removed prior to 2019 and around the time roof was reslated.

== Rectors ==
- 1844–1854 John Crouch Grylls
- 1858–1880 Edward Rogers
- 1891-1893 Archdeacon Robert Leftbridge King
- 1899 R. Noake
- 1902 P. W. Dowe
- 1904 G. S. Fielding
- 1907–1912 Gerard D'Arcy-Irvine
- 1921 John Done
- 1933–1937 Stanley Grant Best
- 1941 A. W. Morton
- 1941 C. K. Hammond
- 1965 Allan Yuill
- 2013 Justin Moffatt

== Ministry ==
Records dating back to the 1840s record a history of charitable giving by the church in response to regional emergencies including the 1848 sinking of the steamer Sovereign, and the 1851 Gundagai floods. Collections were taken in aid of the poor in the parish.

The church has hosted events for a number of other organizations, including the Naval Brigade in 1905, and a five-day campaign of the Sydney University Evangelical Union in 1940.

== Notable attendees ==
- Dame Eadith Walker was baptised at the Garrison Church, and Sir George Reid and Sir Edmund Barton both reportedly received part of their education in the associated school hall.
- Glenn McGrath and Jane McGrath's wedding was at the Garrison Church, as was Jane's funeral.

== Heritage listing ==
As at 17 July 2007, Holy Trinity Anglican Church is a unique complex of church and former school hall in Sydney which is rare in New South Wales in regard to its age, architecture, and historic associations. The construction of the church and adjoining school was initiated by the Church Act of 1836; the church being completed in stages between 1840 and 1878 to designs prepared by Henry Ginn and Edmund T. Blacket in the archaeologically correct Gothic Revival style, and the school between 1846 and ca.1860. The church is one of the earliest extant ecclesiastical structures in the state, while the former school hall is a unique rare survivor of the era. Consciously sited against the rock scarp and fronting the public reserve of Argyle Place, the mid-nineteenth century setting of the church is unique. The church and its contents demonstrate the nineteenth century commercial importance of the harbourside suburb, and the political and social status of the parish. The strong support for the establishment of the church by Bishop Broughton was sustained by prominent local families. Parishioner's endowments have included the unique east window (1861) imported from the workshop of Charles Clutterbuck of London, and the locally produced Lyon and Cottier windows (1878). the former school exhibits similar associations with the nineteenth century history of this city suburb. The comparatively recent military associations of the church are of considerable social significance, while the importance of the church to the broader community of the state is demonstrated through ongoing material support by institutions such as the National Trust. More importantly the church continues to serve members of the Anglican Church.

Garrison Anglican Church Precinct was listed on the New South Wales State Heritage Register on 2 April 1999 having satisfied the following criteria.

The place is important in demonstrating the course, or pattern, of cultural or natural history in New South Wales.

Garrison Anglican Church is of State significance in demonstrating a significant historical process. The construction of the church was initiated in 1840 shortly after the passing of the Church Act of 1836. The Act provided State aid to the major church denominations for the construction of new churches, employment of ministers, etc., as such placed for the first time in the history of New South Wales each of the religions on an equal footing. The church and adjoining school hall were built through funds secured by the Anglican church under the provisions of the Act.

The place has a strong or special association with a person, or group of persons, of importance of cultural or natural history of New South Wales's history.

Garrison Anglican Church is of State significance for its associations with William Grant Broughton, Bishop of Australia. Broughton supported the establishment of the parish.

The place is important in demonstrating aesthetic characteristics and/or a high degree of creative or technical achievement in New South Wales.

The Garrison Church is of State significance as an early example of the archaeologically correct Gothic Revival style in NSW. The eastern stained glass window is of State significance as one of the earliest instances of stained glass in NSW. This early window is complemented by a set of Lyon and Cottier windows from the second half of the 19th century.

The place has a strong or special association with a particular community or cultural group in New South Wales for social, cultural or spiritual reasons.

The Garrison Church is of State significance as a place of commemoration of the nation's military past. This is borne out by the continuing tradition of placing memorials in the Church and the use of the hall for exhibits. The Garrison Church is of local significance as a place of worship since the 1840s.

The place possesses uncommon, rare or endangered aspects of the cultural or natural history of New South Wales.

The Garrison church is of State significant rarity as one of five extant churches built after the passing of the Church Act of 1836 with money provided by the Government. The Garrison parish hall is of State significance as a rare, possibly unique, extant example of a parochial school erected in the 1840s. The Church and hall are of State significance as the only known ecclesiastical and educational work of architect Henry Ginn. It is one of only three examples of Ginn's work extant in NSW. The stained class east window is of State significance as one of the earliest uses of stained glass in NSW (1861). Other elements of the church fittings are rare, for example the raised pulpit.

== See also ==
- Australian non-residential architectural styles
- List of Anglican churches in the Diocese of Sydney
