= Christ Church St Laurence =

Church in Sydney, New South Wales, Australia

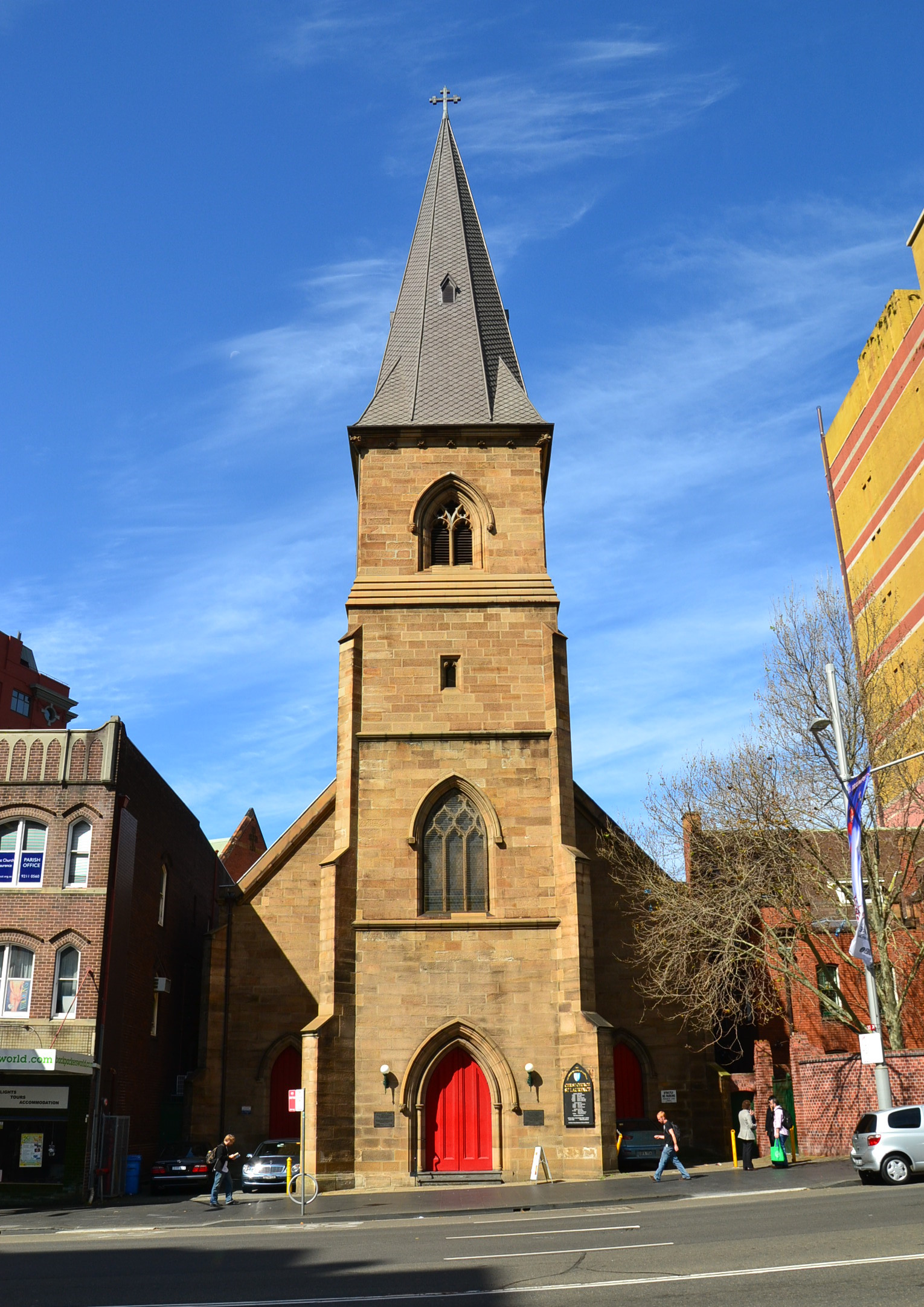
- Christ Church St Laurence, pictured in 2011

- Location in greater metropolitan Sydney
- 33°52′54″S 151°12′17″E
- Location: 814 George Street, Haymarket, City of Sydney. New South Wales
- Country: Australia
- Denomination: Anglican
- Churchmanship: Anglo-Catholic
- Website: ccsl.org.au

History
- Status: Church
- Founded: 1838
- Dedication: Christ; Saint Laurence
- Consecrated: 1845

Architecture
- Functional status: Active
- Architect(s): Henry Robertson; Edmund Blacket; John Burcham Clamp
- Architectural type: Church
- Style: Old Colonial Gothic Picturesque; Victorian Free Gothic

Administration
- Province: New South Wales
- Diocese: Sydney
- Parish: St Lawrence

Clergy
- Rector: The Rev'd Dr Daniel Dries

New South Wales Heritage Register
- Type: State heritage (built)
- Criteria: a., c., d., e.
- Designated: 2 April 1999
- Reference no.: 123
- Type: Church
- Category: Religion
- Builders: Hill & Son - pipe organ

Christ Church St Laurence is an Anglican church located at 814 George Street, near Central railway station and Haymarket, in Sydney, New South Wales, Australia. It is the principal centre of Anglo-Catholic worship in the city and Diocese of Sydney, where the Anglicanism is predominantly Evangelical in character. Anglo-Catholicism is manifested at Christ Church St Laurence by an emphasis on the sacraments, ritual, music and social action, all of which have been prominent features of Anglo-Catholicism since the 19th century.

The parish dates from 1838 and the church building from 1845. It was the first Anglican church in the city to be consecrated by a bishop and is the second-oldest of the city's Anglican church buildings still in use. The first architect was Henry Robertson, who was soon succeeded by Edmund Blacket, a major figure in Australian architectural history and a parishioner of Christ Church St Laurence, to whom the church owes many of its notable features. The church was added to the New South Wales State Heritage Register on 2 April 1999.

The choir of Christ Church St Laurence has a high reputation among Anglican parish choirs. It performs a repertoire ranging from Gregorian chant to 21st-century works. In existence for the consecration of the church in 1845, and possibly earlier, it is one of the oldest choral groups in Australia. The church's pipe organ was built by William Hill & Son, of London, in 1891 and installed in 1906. It is also listed on the NSW State Heritage Register.

The church has an active program of support for people who are socially marginalised, including the homeless and asylum seekers. This work originates in the social character of the parish's neighbourhood, which has a history of poverty, immigration, and transience. Social action is now carried on through the separately administered Christ Church St Laurence Charitable Trust.

== Early history ==
In 1838, fifty years after the foundation of New South Wales, Sydney possessed only two permanent Anglican churches, St Philip's Church Hill (1810; present building 1856) to the north, and St James', King Street (1822), near the centre. The Bishop of Australia, William Grant Broughton, saw the need for another church for the settlement at the city's southern boundary, then becoming a poorer industrialised quarter. This part of Sydney was in the "civil" or "cadastral" Parish of St Lawrence, an administrative division later used only to identify the location of properties for land transactions, but at that time also the ecclesiastical parish. The origins of the name of the parish were unknown, even in 1845, when the incumbent William Horatio Walsh wrote: "The Governor, (which, I know not), or Surveyor-General, who originally laid out the parochial limits, will supply any further information as to the origin of the nomenclature of the parish. The only St Lawrence I know of was ... a Deacon, who was burnt at Rome in the third century." At the bishop's expense, a temporary church was set up in the Albion Brewery on the corner of Elizabeth Street and Albion Street. This temporary "Saint Lawrence Church" operated from 1838 to 1845.

In the first years, two priests were appointed as ministers of the Parish of St Lawrence, Thomas Steele (who was also responsible for the Parish of Cook's River) in 1838 and Edmund Ashton Dicken (who had arrived in the colony in December 1838, with a fairly obvious alcohol problem) for the first three months of 1839. William Horatio Walsh, a newly arrived deacon, was appointed in April 1839. Bishop Broughton ordained him in September 1839 and Walsh held the position of incumbent of the parish until 1867. Walsh is considered the first rector of Christ Church St Laurence.

The incumbent's responsibilities extended beyond the Parish of St Lawrence to the surrounding suburbs, each of which eventually became independent parishes: Redfern and Waterloo (St Paul's, 1855), Surry Hills (St Michael's, 1852), and the Glebe (St John's, Bishopthorpe, 1856).

Bishop Broughton laid the foundation stone of the present Christ Church on 1 January 1840. The site, at the apex of Pitt and George Streets, was set amidst institutions from the convict era. Across Pitt Street (now the site of Central railway station) were the Carters' Barracks (where convicts still underwent punishment on treadmills), the police superintendent's residence and the Benevolent Asylum (1821, operated by the Benevolent Society of New South Wales). Beyond the eastern boundaries of these institutions lay the Devonshire Street Cemetery (1820). To the south of the church were the toll gates and toll house designed in "gothick" style by convict architect Francis Greenway.

Economic recession halted construction of Christ Church between 1841 and 1843, when Edmund Thomas Blacket took over as architect. Bishop Broughton consecrated the church on 10 September 1845 with the title of Christ Church. In common usage it became known as Christ Church, Saint Lawrence (see above). The parish adopted Saint Laurence of Rome (with that spelling) as patron saint in 1884, giving rise to the unusual double dedication which has survived.

== Churchmanship ==
The first rector, W. H. Walsh, like Bishop Broughton, was associated with the High Church group in England which was led by Joshua Watson and which also included Edward Coleridge. Walsh was also associated with High Church organisations – the Society for the Propagation of the Gospel, which initially funded Walsh's stipend, and the Society for Promoting Christian Knowledge.

Walsh also corresponded regularly with the Society for Promoting Church Music and the Ecclesiological Society which he addressed in London in 1851.

Walsh was the foremost proponent in Sydney of the early writings of the Oxford Movement (or "Tractarians"). He was on at least one occasion referred to as "the chief Puseyite" (a usually pejorative term derived from the name of E. B. Pusey, a leader of the Oxford Movement).

The result was a gothic church interior, with an ordered liturgy – Sung Matins and Evensong supported by a robed choir, and frequent Communion services with an offertory of sacramental alms and a surpliced preacher. Bishop Broughton wrote of the worship at Christ Church:

"I have heard objections stated to some of the arrangements in the celebration of divine service, as savouring of novelty and innovation; but I am bound to say that there is no contrariety in any part of the practice to the most approved usages of the Church of England, with which I have been familiar from my earliest years; and everything is marked by such a degree of order and solemnity, that I could wish the observances of this church to be taken, if it were possible, as a model for the imitation of every church in my diocese."

This High Church position was maintained under Walsh's successors, George Vidal and Charles Garnsey. Ritual advances towards Anglo-Catholicism were suppressed by the Evangelical diocesan, Bishop Frederic Barker (Bishop of Sydney, 1854-1882). The most significant dispute with Christ Church occurred in 1868 when Barker ordered the removal of an image of the cross above the altar from the newly installed tiled reredos.

Following Bishop Barker's death, the parish, under Charles Garnsey, began to adopt Anglo-Catholic practices, which had appeared in England in the 1860s and gathered strength (while also generating opposition) in the 1870s. In 1884–5, the parish introduced a cross and candles on the altar, a credence table, festal processions with cross and banners, daily services of Holy Communion, eucharistic vestments and choral Communion services. A correspondent to the London Church Times in late 1884 said of Christ Church "It is, indeed, an oasis in a desert."

However, some aspects of Anglo-Catholic practice were not introduced until relatively late, with the "high celebration" involving three sacred ministers (priest, deacon and subdeacon) introduced in 1913, The English Hymnal in 1916 and incense in 1921.

In 1910, Archbishop John Wright imposed the requirement that all clergy, upon appointment, undertake not to wear the eucharistic vestment (the chasuble) in any church in the diocese. Although he himself was not a conservative evangelical, and was leader of liberal evangelicals in England before his coming, he believed that the eucharistic vestments were not lawful in the Church of England. The parish complied under protest in order to secure appointment of a new rector. The chasuble was worn for the last time inside Christ Church on 19 April 1911. Since that date, priests have worn a cope instead of a chasuble when celebrating the Eucharist at Christ Church. In 1911 the Revd Charles William Coles was offered the incumbency, but he declined, due to the archbishop's restrictions. (Coles would go on to be vicar of the English Anglo-Catholic "shrine church" of St Agatha's, Landport in Portsmouth for 40 years.)

A very visible part of Christ Church's commitment to Anglo-Catholicism was the outdoor "procession of witness" held as part of the annual dedication festival from 1926 until 1967. Sometimes led by as many as three thurifers, the processions featured parish organisations and guilds, clergy from around the Anglican Communion (in copes), the occasional mitred bishop (mitres being a rarity in Sydney), clergy from Orthodox churches, and representatives from sympathetic Sydney parishes and St Gabriel's, a girls' school run by the Community of the Sisters of the Church in the nearby suburb of Waverley.

== Architectural history ==
=== Principal architects ===
The building and interior of Christ Church are mostly the work of three architects, covering the period 1840–1927.

Henry Robertson (1802-1881) designed Christ Church in a transitional style incorporating Old Colonial Gothick Picturesque and Victorian Free Gothic. The builders were Taylor and Robb, who used Sydney sandstone, possibly from Pyrmont quarries. Walsh criticised Robertson's work, in the light of later principles of Gothic Revival style.

Edmund Thomas Blacket (1817-1883) started work on Christ Church when construction revived in 1843. He completed the tower and steeple and the timber ceiling, and redesigned the windows. Interior design features by Blacket include the font, pulpit, carved pew-ends, and panelling at the west end (originally part of a choir gallery). In 1873 a memorial to John Coleridge Patteson (1827-1871), the martyred Bishop of Melanesia, designed by Blacket, was installed in the church. It incorporates an effigy executed by Henry Apperley (1824-1887). Patteson had visited Christ Church on several occasions. Blacket was a parishioner of Christ Church from 1848, serving as churchwarden for 22 years (1851-1873). Blacket's sons were responsible for remodelling the sanctuary and chancel in 1884–5 to reflect the parish's adoption of Anglo-Catholic liturgy.

John Burcham Clamp (1869-1931), a former pupil of the parish school (Christ Church School), was parish architect from 1899 and was responsible for the restoration of the interior of Christ Church after a fire in August 1905. His work includes the reredos (1905), a font cover (1904), the St Laurence Chapel (1912) and screening under the organ (1914). Clamp also designed a chancel screen, installed in 1922 but removed in 1942. The screen, like the chapel and Clamp's organ-case, had a crown of thorns motif carved in its woodwork. After a land exchange with the New South Wales government when Central railway station was built, Clamp designed a new rectory and vestries (1904) and a new school building, now the parish hall (1905). These brick and stone buildings use a mix of Federation styles: Elizabethan, Arts and Crafts, and Free Style.

=== Later work ===
After Clamp, little further building or decoration was undertaken for several decades. In 1938, a large mural on the east wall was painted by Vergilio Lo Schiavo (1909-1971), one of the few artists to have employed fresco technique in Australia. In 1963, Morton Earle Herman (1907-1983) did remedial work on the church's interior. He published a pioneering book on the Blackets in the same year that he worked at Christ Church. Herman removed decorative elements, some of them Blacket's own, with the aim of recovering what he saw as Blacket's purity of design.

=== 2019 restoration ===
In 2019, Paul Davies and Jean Wahl of Paul Davies Pty Ltd undertook the first full interior restoration since 1906. The work included cleaning and repointing the stonework, restoring the cedar pews and repainting the timber ceiling, pillars and sanctuary panelling. The repainting restored colours and decorative elements covered over by Herman. The lighting system was entirely replaced, the sound system upgraded and environmentally responsible heating and cooling installed.

== Stained glass ==
When Edmund Blacket was appointed architect he redesigned the windows, introducing the present stone tracery. The windows were at first glazed in simple decorative patterns. As parishioners donated memorial windows, figural stained glass was introduced.

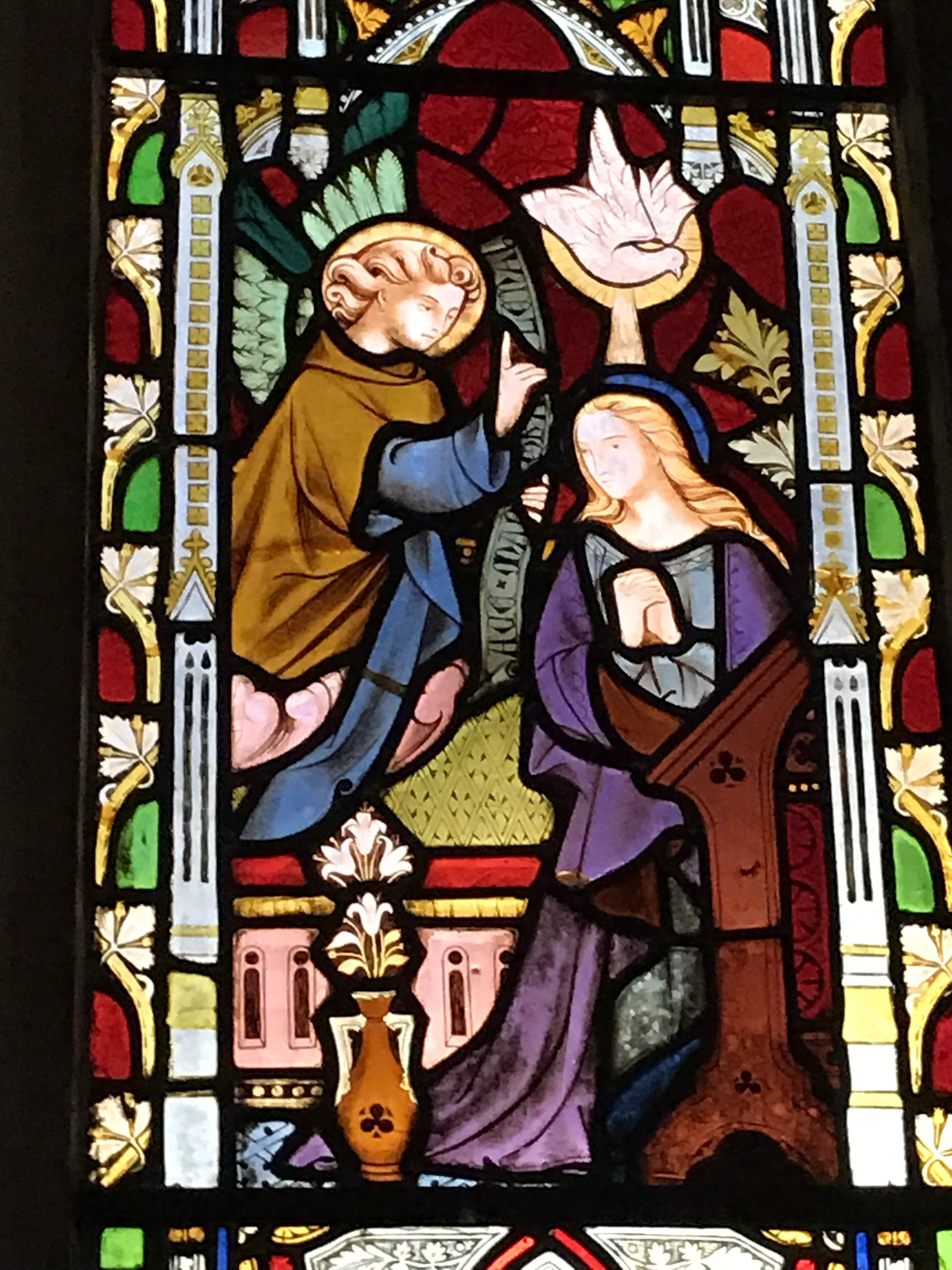
The Annunciation of Our Lady. Detail of a window designed in 1857 by John Clayton and produced by the glassworks at Mells, in Somerset.

Ten windows were imported from England between 1855 and 1864. They include work by leading stained-glass companies of the mid-19th century: James Powell & Sons and Charles Clutterbuck and Clayton & Bell, all of London, and William Wailes, of Newcastle upon Tyne. The windows designed by Clayton & Bell were manufactured at Mells, Somerset, and are early work by the brothers Edwin, Harry and Mark Horwood. Harry Horwood later became a prominent stained-glass maker in Ontario, Canada. Of historical interest is Clutterbuck's memorial window for the family of Sir Alfred Stephen, Chief Justice of New South Wales (1845–1873).

Four windows were manufactured in Australia and installed between 1894 and 1912. They are the work of Lyon & Cottier, F Ashwin & Co and John Ashwin & Co, Sydney's premier stained-glass firms in that period. One of the Australian productions is the great east window, the third to occupy this position. Installed in 1906, it depicts the crucified and glorified Christ, worshipped by over fifty human figures and twenty angels. It is the work of John Radecki (1865-1955). This window is his first major independent work.

In 2020, the church's repertoire of stained glass was completed when two lights were added to the north window of the sanctuary. Depicting St Peter and St James the Great, they were made in the 1960s by Martin van der Toorn, the then proprietor of John Ashwin & Co. They were originally located in St Paul's Pro-Cathedral, Hay, in the Diocese of Riverina, New South Wales.

== Other artworks ==
The Resurrection by Hans Feibusch.

Over the course of the first half of the twentieth century, Christ Church displayed a variety of framed art prints by Renaissance and later artists. Apart from the Stations of the Cross by Piedmontese painter Luigi Morgari (1857-1935), these have been superseded, from the late 1960s, by original artworks. Many of these works were produced by parishioners of Christ Church. The works include:

- The shrine painting of The Madonna of the Rug (1973) and the shrine painting of Christ the Redeemer (1977) both by parishioner Alan Oldfield (1943-2004).
- The Triptych of the Incarnation (1987) by parishioner Earle Backen AM (1927-2005).
- The Descent from the Cross, a copy of the painting by Rubens in Antwerp Cathedral, by Vergilio Lo Schiavo (1909-1971).
- The Resurrection (1968) by the Anglo-German artist Hans Feibusch (1898-1998).
- Peace! Be Still! (1996) by parishioner Margaret Ackland.
- The corpus on the processional cross (1998) by sculptor and parishioner Rosemary Wynnis Madigan (1926-2019).

The most recent major commission is the Orthodox Icon Series (2005) by Earle Backen. The set of 14 icons depicts scenes from the life of Jesus and the Church and carries on the sequence commenced in the Triptych of the Incarnation. They are displayed throughout the year, except in Lent and Holy Week, when the Stations of the Cross are displayed in their place.

== Worship ==
All the activities of Christ Church St Laurence have their origin in the worship of God. That worship takes the form of at least 25 public services every week.

Mass is celebrated three times on Sunday, twice on Wednesday and once on other days, with additional celebrations on major feast days. On Sundays and feast days High Mass or Solemn Mass is celebrated. Three Sunday services are accompanied by music. Sermons are preached at all Sunday Masses as well as on feast days. High Mass on Sundays and feast days, and other occasional services, are livestreamed on the YouTube platform, with recordings subsequently available on that platform. Each year a visiting priest preaches daily over Holy Week and Easter. The devotion of the Stations of the Cross is observed on Fridays in Lent.

Clergy and a group of trained parishioners take communion to people who are in hospital or housebound. Other sacraments are administered as requested.

The offices of Morning and Evening Prayer are read daily, in accordance with the prescription of the Book of Common Prayer. These offices follow A Prayer Book for Australia, except Evening Prayer or Evensong on Sunday which follows the Book of Common Prayer of 1662. Morning and Evening Prayer are also read daily by parishioners unable to attend at the church, using the videoconferencing software Zoom. Any interested person may join this group.

A congregation linked to the parish worships monthly at Mittagong, New South Wales.

A Christian meditation group meets weekly. Outside of formal services, the church is open for long hours on weekdays, when it is visited by many people from its busy neighbourhood who use it for personal devotion or meditation.

There is an active children and youth ministry.

== Music ==
Christ Church St Laurence choristers in surplices, c 1855

The High Mass choir sings on Sunday mornings and major feast days and the Evensong choir on Sunday evenings. Additional choir events include carol services for Advent and Epiphany, and an orchestral Mass on the anniversary of the church's dedication in September. Though the choirs are mainly voluntary, between four and eight choral scholars, who are students or early-career musicians, are paid a stipend. At the Sung Eucharist on Sundays the congregation sings the ordinary, using a variety of musical settings, including some written specially for this service. At all services, hymns are taken from the New English Hymnal.

The director of music is Sam Allchurch, who studied at the University of Cambridge with Geoffrey Webber and Stephen Layton as a Gates Cambridge Scholar, funded by the Bill and Melinda Gates Foundation. Sam Allchurch is also music director of the Sydney Chamber Choir and associate artistic director of the Gondwana Choirs. The choir's assistant conductor is Toby Wong. The organist is David Tagg.

The choir is committed to new music by Australian composers and has commissioned liturgical works from Brooke Shelley (Viri Galilaei, 2021), Fiona Loader (Angelus ad virginem, 2020), Joseph Twist (Missa brevis, 2020), Oscar Smith (St Laurence Service, 2020) and William Yaxley (Mass for St Laurence, 2019).

Apart from its role in liturgy, the choir regularly gives concerts. In recent years, performances have included Monteverdi's Vespers (2025), Bach's St John Passion (2023 & 2022), Handel's Messiah (2021), Charpentier's Te Deum and Vivaldi's Gloria (2019), Buxtehude's Membra Jesu nostri (2018) and Bach's Mass in B minor (2017).

Concerts and the orchestral Mass are accompanied by the church's ensemble-in-residence, the Muffat Collective, a period instrument quartet, augmented by other professional musicians. The Collective also gives several concerts annually at the church. Other instrumental and vocal concerts are occasionally held in the church. The choir has released several recordings, including a project to record music for the whole liturgical year. It has toured extensively in New Zealand, the UK and continental Europe, and the United States, with residencies in Westminster Abbey and St Paul's Cathedral, London, and services at Notre-Dame, Paris.

The choir's first known performance was for the consecration of Christ Church in September 1845, when it was augmented by members of the Sydney Choral Society. The choir was the first in New South Wales to wear surplices. The choir stalls were originally on each side of the aisle in the nave. In 1885 the choir moved into the expanded chancel. From the 1940s it sang in the St Laurence chapel, until 2022, when the Evensong choir returned to the chancel while the High Mass choir remained in the chapel.

The church's first organ, built by George Holdich of London in 1844, was destroyed by fire in 1905. The present organ, built by William Hill & Sons of London in 1891, was privately owned in Sydney before it was bought by the parish in 1905. It was restored by Orgues Létourneau of Saint-Hyacinthe, Quebec, in 1979. As well as its liturgical function, the organ is heard in a monthly Sunday-afternoon recital, and appears on a number of recordings. The Hill organ is supplemented by a 2011 continuo organ by Henk Klop of Garderen, Netherlands.

An independent entity, St Laurence Music Incorporated, was established in 2001 to promote the appreciation of choral, organ and orchestral music through performances, recordings, tours and scholarships at or in association with the church.

== Bells ==
The first rector, W. H. Walsh, commissioned the original six bells from John Taylor & Sons of Loughborough in 1852. They were installed when the spire was completed in 1855. They were retuned and matched with four new bells by Whitechapel Foundry of London in 1982 and reinstalled on a new steel frame in 1984. In accordance with tradition, the 10 bells are named in honour of saints or benefactors.

== Social action ==
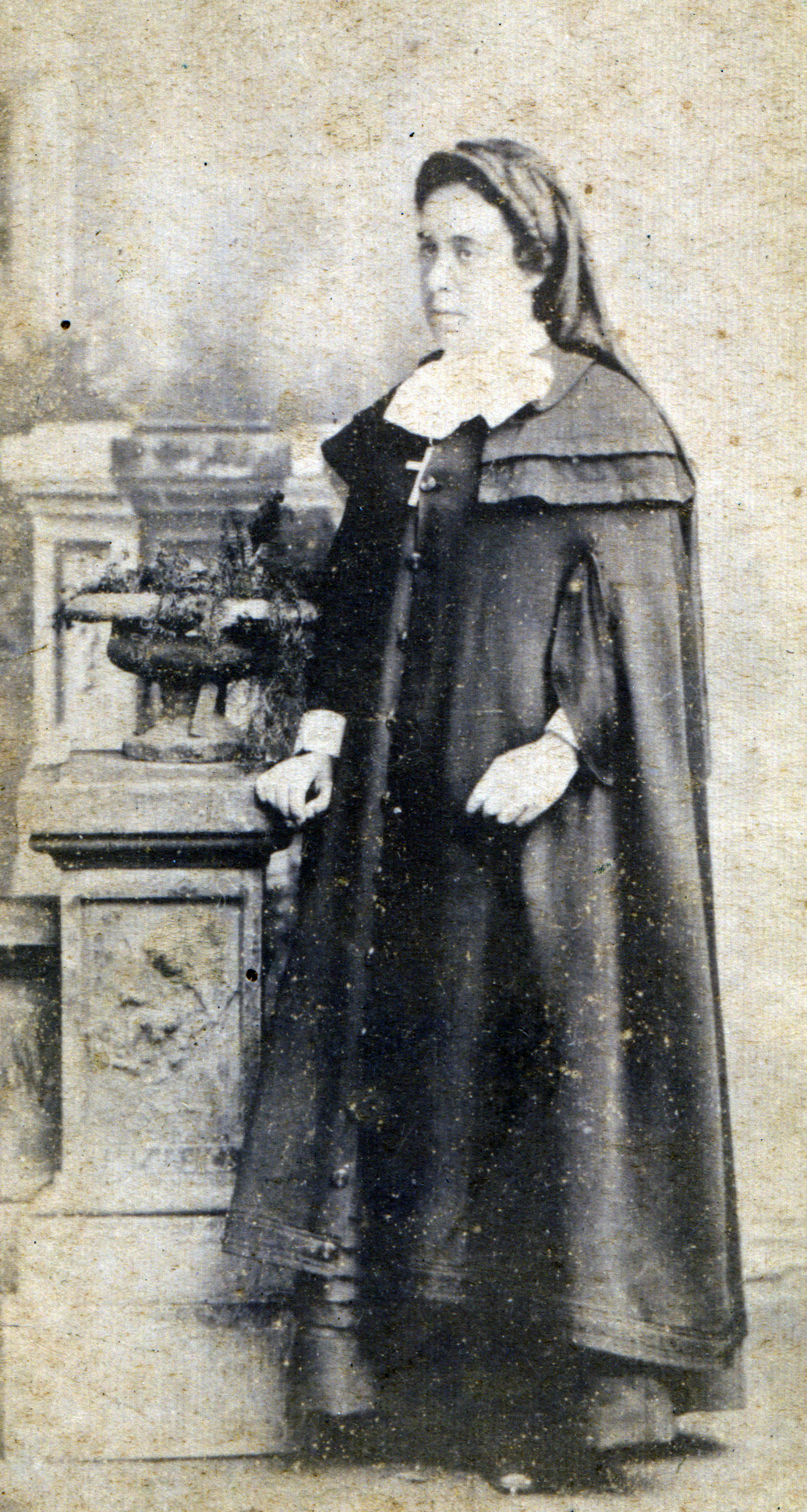
Amy Matilda Michelmore (1859-1886), a member of the Guild of St Laurence and a postulant with the Community of the Sisters of the Church. She died from typhoid contracted while nursing the sick of the parish.

The social action of the parish has a long history that stretches back before the creation of government welfare agencies and the state school system. For almost a century until 1934, the parish, initially with the support of the St Laurence Parochial Association, provided education through the parish schools.

In the 1880s, the need to care for the sick and poor of the parish was met by the Guild of St Laurence Mission. In the war of 1914–18, the parish offered a "cheero" in the hall, feeding and entertaining servicemen passing through Central Railway Station.

In the depression of the 1930s, a soup kitchen served as many as 300 meals a night. A free dispensary gave treatment and supplied medicine to people who could not afford a doctor. In 1936, the parish, in co-operation with the NSW Child Welfare Department, founded a boys' welfare bureau to provide employment and welfare services.

In 1957, Father John Hope donated a house in Glebe, Tranby, to a co-operative that established what is now the Tranby Aboriginal College.

In the 1980s-90s, the parish pioneered HIV/AIDS ministry in Australia. In 1984, Christ Church hosted the funeral of Bobby Goldsmith and, in 1991, initiated an annual AIDS Requiem Mass dedicated to the memory of those who had died from AIDS. This was at a time when people with HIV/AIDS were widely ostracised. The parish continues to welcome people whose sexual orientation is condemned by some religious organisations.

=== Present ===
Christ Church St Laurence aims to be diverse and inclusive. It emphasises a ministry to the underprivileged, the persecuted and the socially marginalised. The St Laurence Centre, housed in the church hall building, is a comparatively new entity, aiming to continue and expand the parish's outreach in these areas. It houses counselling services and offers a weekly lunch for all comers.

The church is open every weekday and is frequently visited by people in need or distress. Volunteer vergers are present to offer simple food and drink to any who ask.

The parish gives substantial financial support to Australian and overseas charities. This support is provided by an annual Lenten appeal, a monthly retiring collection and social events such as the annual parish lunch and a trivia night.

One organisation supported is St Laurence House, an agency dedicated to disadvantaged, homeless, and at-risk youth. The parish was an original founder of St Laurence House, though it is no longer directly involved in its management. Another organisation supported is the Asylum Seekers Centre in Sydney. Gifts of food and toiletries are regularly delivered from the church to the centre. A number of parishioners are involved in visiting people in immigration detention centres and in prison. A monthly retiring collection supports the work of Anglican churches in the South Pacific.

Other groups or projects funded through the Anglican Board of Mission - Australia include: Mudgin-Gal, Aboriginal women's organisation, Redfern; Wontulp Bi-Buya Theological College, providing adult education for Aborigines, Cairns; literacy in Vanuatu; disaster risk reduction and emergency support in South Sudan; an integrated gender project in Zambia.

These activities of the parish are being expanded under the auspices of the Christ Church St Laurence Charitable Trust. The trust, which is not under the control of the parish, was created and endowed under the will of a late medical practitioner to provide financial assistance in the achievement of the parish's charitable objectives.

== Parish schools ==
The Christ Church Schools, viewed from Pitt Street, near current day Rawson Place, c 1870

A Church of England school operated in the southern district of Sydney long before the ecclesiastical parish was formed. The school commenced in 1830 and originally operated in rented accommodation.

In 1845, Blacket constructed a building for this school at what is now the south-west corner of Pitt Street and Rawson Place. A second school building, financed by the businessman and philanthropist Thomas Sutcliffe Mort, was opened in 1860. The 1860 building became the primary school while the 1845 building operated as the infants school. Headmasters during this period included Samuel Hopkinson Turton (headmaster 1847-1870) and Seth Frank Ward (headmaster 1870-1880).

The school's site was resumed by the government in 1901 as part of the redevelopment required by the construction of Central Railway Station. As a result of these resumptions, John Burcham Clamp built a new school building, now the church hall, north of the church in 1905. Headmasters in this period included William Warner (headmaster 1895-1905) and Ernest Godfried Jacobs (headmaster 1907-1924)

In 1924 the elementary day school closed and the St Laurence College, a secondary school for boys, was opened instead. Headmasters of the college were the Revd Alan Whitehorn (headmaster, 1924-1926), the Revd John Henry Allen Chauvel (headmaster, 1926-1927) and the Revd Kenneth Douglas Roach (headmaster, 1928-1932). The college moved its premises to Dolls Point (Primrose House, 190 Russell Avenue) in 1930 and closed in 1934 after a brief return to its old location.

The parish's right to continue to use the money received as compensation for the railway resumptions for educational purposes became the subject of a rancorous dispute between the parish and the diocese. The Supreme Court of New South Wales settled the dispute in favour of the diocese in 1933.

== List of rectors ==
Canon William Horatio Walsh, first rector of Christ Church St Laurence

- 1839–1867: William Horatio Walsh
- 1867–1878: George Vidal
- 1878–1894: Charles Frederick Garnsey
- 1895–1900: Gerard Trower
- 1901–1910: Frederick John Albery
- 1911–1925: Clive Meillon Statham
- 1926–1964: John Hope
- 1964–1996: Patrick Austin Day
- 1996–2000: Michael Nicholas Roderick Bowie
- 2001–2012: Adrian Maxwell Stephens
- 2013–present: Daniel Michael Dries

== List of organists and choirmasters (partial) ==
- William Jonathan Johnson: 1845–1866
- William Henry Nash: 1867–1869, 1883–1884
- William Stanley: 1870–1882
- Edward John Massey: 1886-1890
- Ernest Edwin Philip Truman: 1893-1896
- John Matthew Ennis: 1900-1902
- William Biggs: 1902–1914
- Richard Henry Kay: 1914–1918
- Edwin John Robinson: 1918–1927
- Gorjes Christian Crawford-Hellemann: 1927–1931, 1933–1934
- Colin Henry Sapsford: 1936–1980
- Neil Anderson McEwan: 1980–2018 (director of music)
- Sam Allchurch: 2018–present (director of music)

== Gallery ==
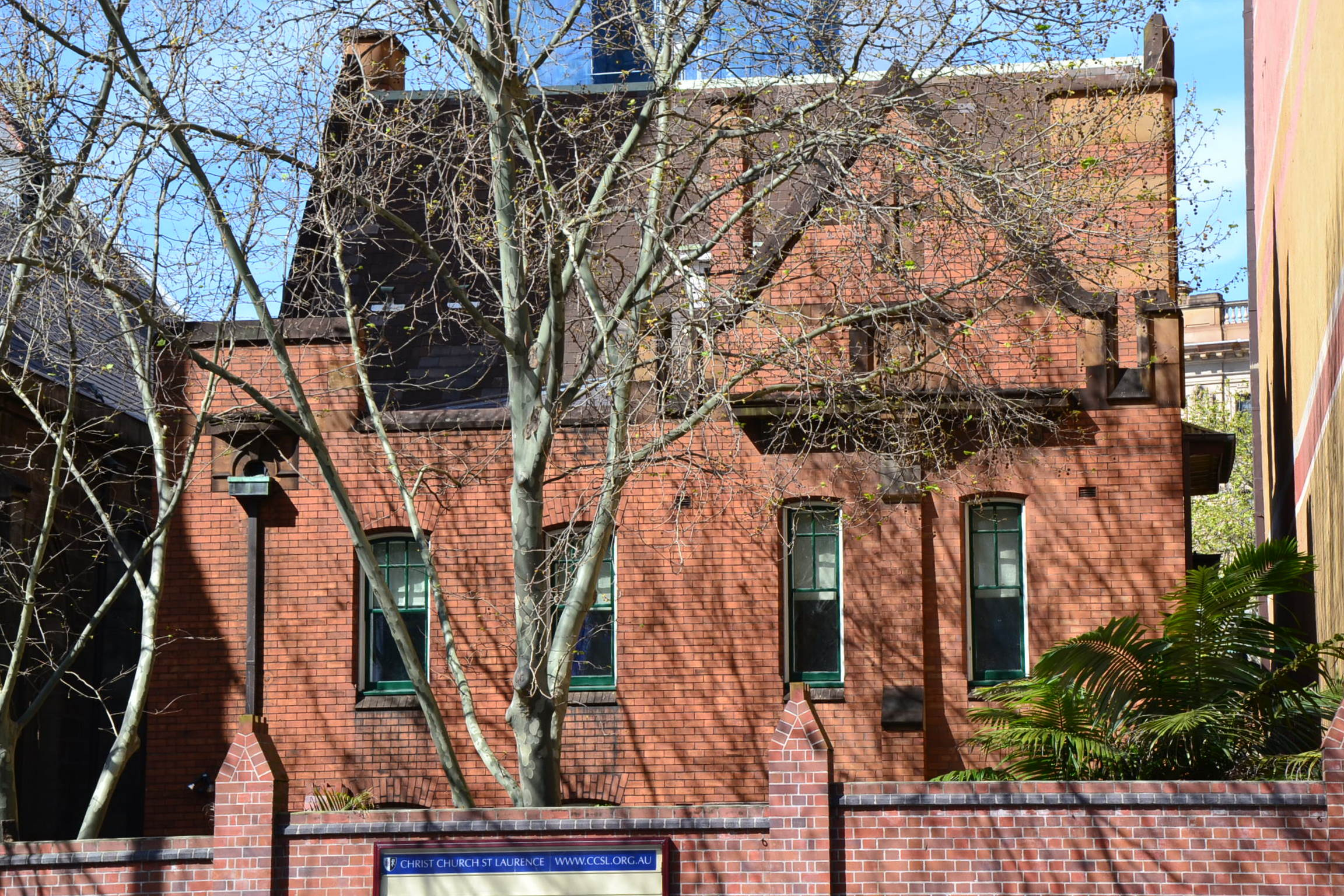
Rectory

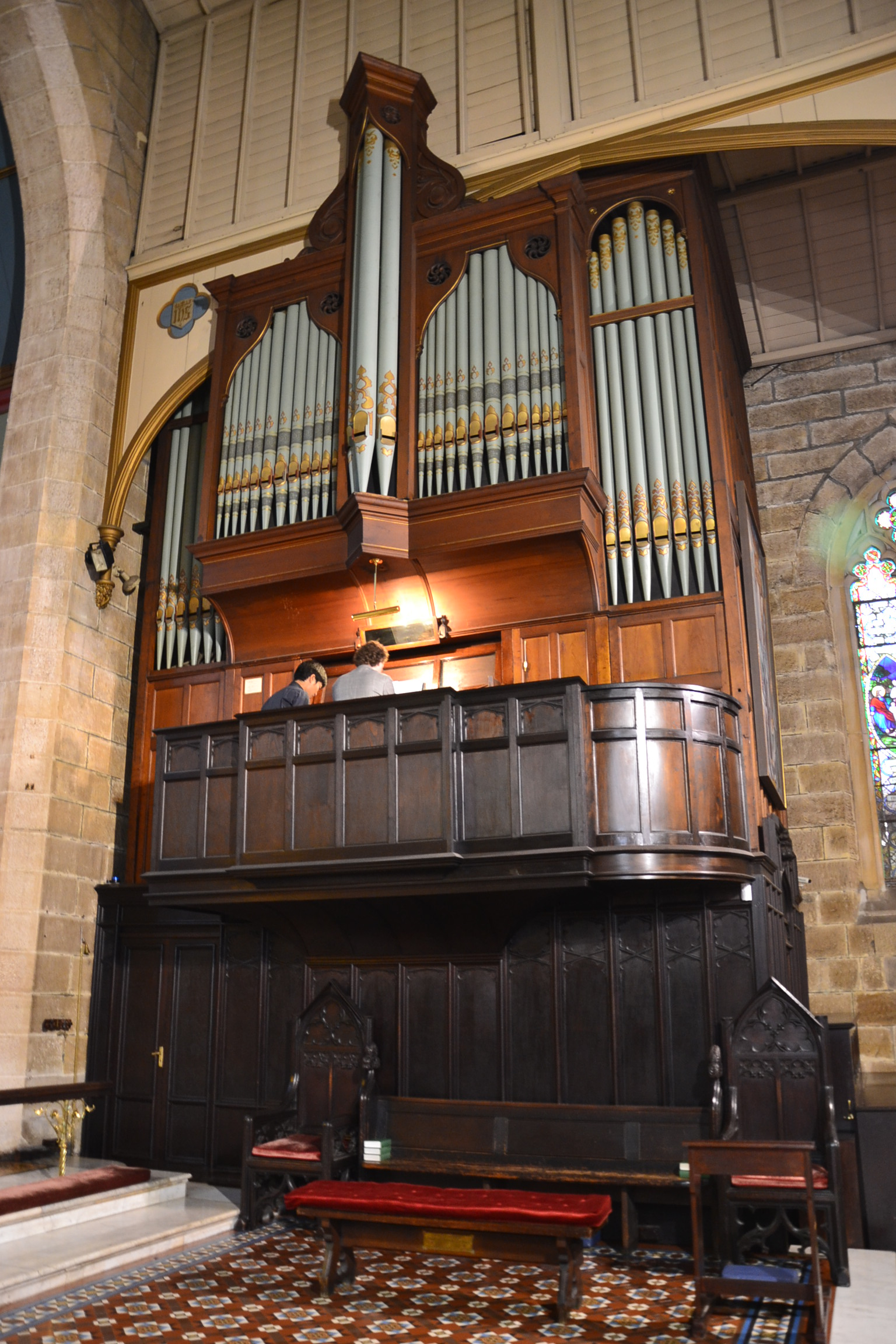
Organ

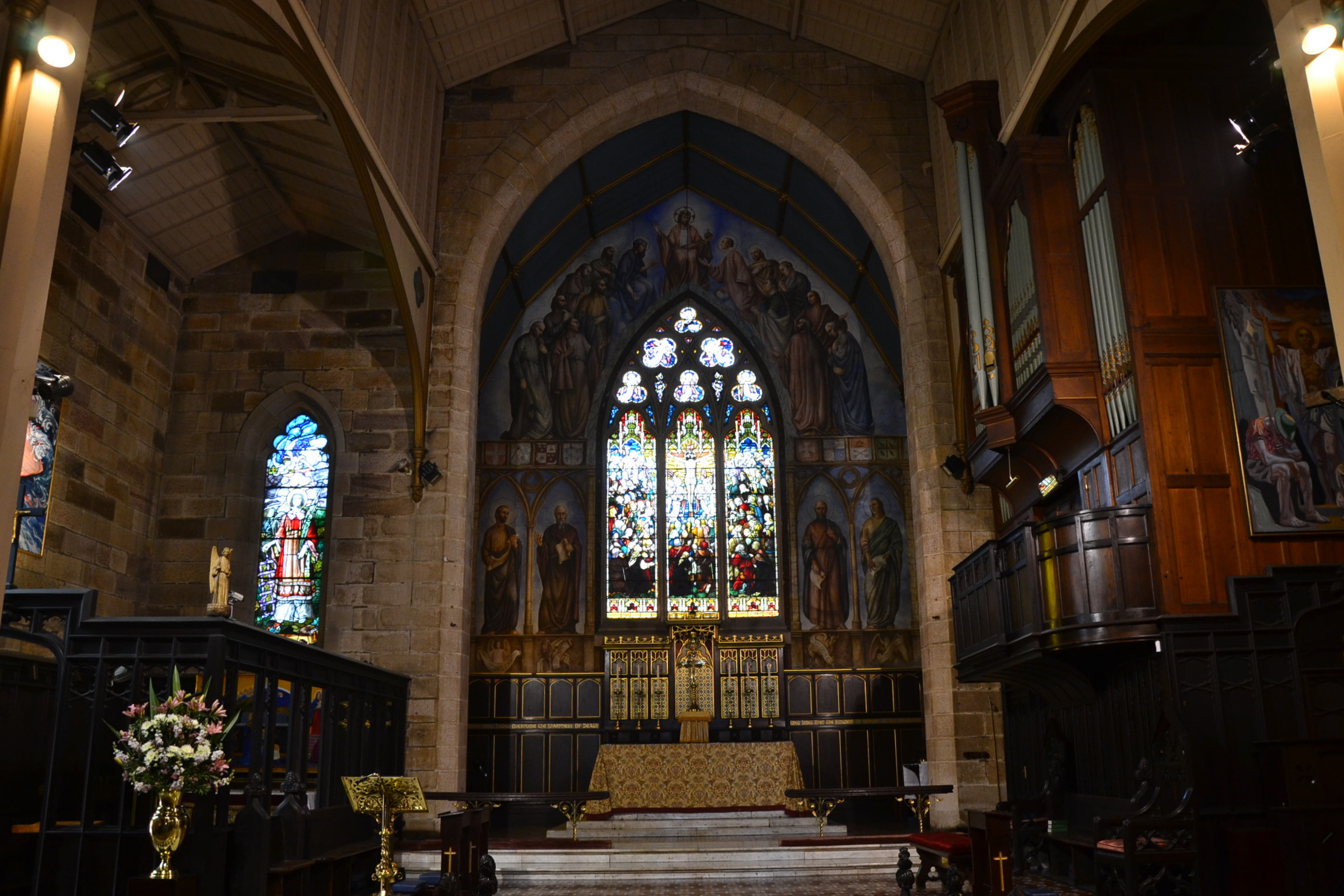
Interior

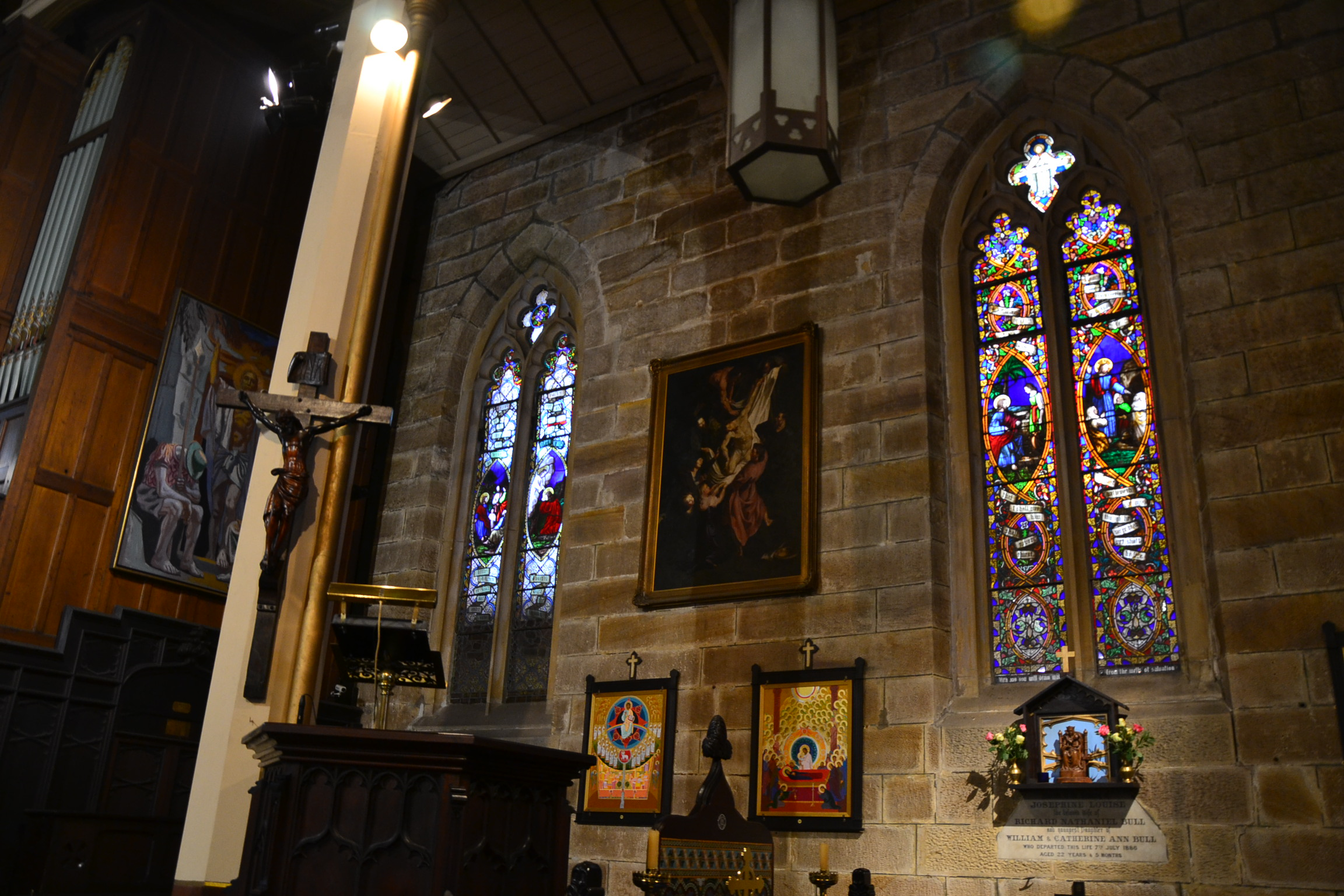
Interior

== Awards and nominations ==
=== ARIA Music Awards ===
The ARIA Music Awards is an annual awards ceremony that recognises excellence, innovation, and achievement across all genres of Australian music. They commenced in 1987.

Year	Nominee / work	Award	Result	Ref.
1991	Victoria: Missa Surge Propera	Best Classical Album	Nominated	

== See also ==
- Australian non-residential architectural styles
- List of Anglican churches in the Diocese of Sydney
