= William Johnson (organist) =

English-born organist and composer (1811–1866)

William Johnson (1811–1866) was an English-born organist, conductor, composer, organ builder and music publisher based in Sydney.

William Jonathan Johnson (1811–1866)

== Early life ==
Johnson was born in London, the son of a watchmaker, Richard Johnson (1774–1844) and Elizabeth Phillips (1780–1861). It is said that his grand-uncle was Rev Richard Johnson (1753–1827), the first Church of England chaplain in Sydney.

== Arrival in Australia ==
Several members of his family came out to New South Wales from the early 1830s including his father and mother, and his brothers James Johnson (1803–1860) - who was also a talented musician - and Robert Ebenezer Johnson (1812–1866) - who became a barrister and a Member of the NSW Legislative Council. Johnson arrived in Sydney, with his brother James, in January 1836 and immediately advertised himself as a professor of music and tuner of organs and piano-fortes.

In 1838, he married Eliza Harris Tompson (1817–1879) at St Matthew's Windsor.

== Career ==
Two years after his marriage, together with John Kinloch (1795–1870), he built Australia's first “finger” organ, which still stands in St Matthew's, Windsor. The partnership with Kinloch did not last long, and he built a number of organs under his own name from the mid-1840s, including organs for:

- St Andrew's temporary church, Sydney (while St Andrew's Cathedral was under construction), in 1844
- Pitt Street Congregational Church, Sydney, in 1845
- W H Aldis, a Sydney tobacconist, in 1845
- The Sydney Choral Society (in the St James’ Infant School-room in Castlereagh Street), in 1846
- St Mary's Anglican Church, Balmain, in 1848.

Johnson became insolvent in 1848. He ceased manufacturing organs after this date.

In 1838, together with his brother, James, he became joint organist at St James’, King Street. His obituary in the Sydney Morning Heraldnoted: "Those who remember his exertions in relation to choral music at St James's will be not be slow to admit that his efforts have had a large influence in promoting that efficiency which now commonly characterises the 'Service of Song'."

== Musical life ==
He commenced a long association with the Parish of St Lawrence in Sydney, when his daughter, Eliza Webster Johnson, was baptised in the temporary church in July 1841. The first record of Johnson's musical activities in the parish is of payments to him by the St Lawrence Parochial Association in April 1843 “for his trouble in instructing the Parochial School Children in Sacred music.” He became the parish organist from about 1844 until his death in 1866. When the new Christ Church St Laurence was opened for worship in 1845, Johnson installed the organ which G M Holdich had built at Soho Square, London, in 1844 (it was subsequently destroyed by fire in 1905). Throughout the early part of this period, Johnson was also an active member of the Sydney Choral Society.

Johnson was also known as a composer. At least two of his popular works survive in published form:

- The Chusan Polka (1852)
- Fancy Ball Polka (1853)

He also edited, in 1854, A collection of psalm tunes (comprising the best compositions in general use, harmonized for four voices, with an arrangement for the organ or piano forte edited by W. J. Johnson, organist and Choir Master of Christ Church, Sydney) and, in the early 1860s, transcribed “Nearer to Thee” for pianoforte.
