= William Horatio Walsh =

William Horatio Walsh (12 September 1812 – 17 December 1882) was a High Church Anglican priest in Australia and England.

Canon William Horatio Walsh.

== Early life ==
Walsh was born in London, the son of Isaac Richard and Sarah Walsh. He was educated at the Grammar School at Bury St Edmunds. An undergraduate of London University, Walsh was made deacon by the Bishop of London, Charles Blomfield on 10 June 1838 on condition that he seek ordination in the colonies. Less than two weeks later, on 21 June 1838, Walsh married Annie Ireland Treherne (1804 - 1890) at his family church of St George's Hanover Square, London, before departing for Australia aboard "The Fairlie" on 31 July 1838.

== Ministry in Sydney ==
The Society for the Propagation of the Gospel (SPG) originally recommended Walsh as chaplain to Van Diemen's Land, however, he arrived in Sydney in December 1838 en route to Hobart and Bishop Broughton (then Bishop of Australia) allowed him to remain in Sydney. Walsh continued to receive financial assistance from the SPG until 1854 when he voluntarily relinquished the support. He was licensed to the parish of St Lawrence in April 1839 while still a deacon and was priested by Bishop Broughton on 22 September 1839.

Over 25 years, from the laying of the foundation stone in 1840, Walsh completed Christ Church St Laurence and guided the formation of several "daughter" parishes in Redfern, Surry Hills and Glebe. Contemporary accounts very often described him as "zealous".

Bishop Broughton once wrote of Walsh as "the last legacy ... of the good Archdeacon of St Albans", the Ven John James Watson (1767-1839) one of the leaders of the High Church group known as the "Hackney Phalanx". This group most likely influenced Walsh's opposition to the national education system which had been proposed by the former Governor of New South Wales, Sir Richard Bourke as a model for state-funded education and that was based on the Irish National System.

He was the chief exponent in Sydney of the Tractarian movement led by John Keble, John Henry Newman and Edward Bouverie Pusey. Walsh's sermon on the duty and privilege of Holy Communion which he delivered in 1842 was cited in Sydney for many years as proof of his Tractarian leanings.

His liturgical "innovations" were no more than preaching in the surplice, conducting choral services with a robed choir, and taking up a collection at the offertory in conformity with the rubrics of the Book of Common Prayer. He followed the rubrics to the letter.

Walsh maintained contact with high church aligned societies in England. On a visit to England in 1851, he addressed meetings of both the Society for Promoting Christian Knowledge and the Society for the Propagation of the Gospel as well as the Ecclesiological Society (in Cambridge). Walsh visited St Augustine's Missionary College, Canterbury in 1851, and spoke at the farewell of the first graduate of the institution who was intended for ministry in Sydney. He also corresponded with the Society for Promoting Church Music.

His ministry embraced Sydney's poorest residents as well as the great and powerful. He involved himself in the work of the Benevolent Asylum (which was just across Pitt Street from Christ Church) and in other philanthropic causes including the Sydney Association for the Temporary Relief of the Poor in 1839, the Sydney Homeopathic Dispensary in 1859, and the Home Visiting and Relief Society in 1862. In addition to this, he dispensed relief at the parsonage door and used his wealthy contacts to obtain work or sustenance for his callers. He was able to speak to a parliamentary inquiry in great detail of the plight of "distressed labourers" during the recession of the early 1840s.

The great and powerful Walsh associated with included the Chief Justice Sir Alfred Stephen (1802 - 1894), the Colonial Treasurer, Robert Campbell (1804 -1859), and the businessman Thomas Sutcliffe Mort (1816 - 1878). With Mort, Walsh was one of the proponents of the Australian Mutual Provident Society originally intended as a "means of providing for clergymen and their families in case of old age or death overtaking the head". Walsh was also an early supporter of the architect Edmund Thomas Blacket (1817-1883) who was the architect of Christ Church from 1843, a parishioner from 1848 and a churchwarden from 1851 to 1873.

Walsh took drawing lessons from Conrad Martens together with Edmund Blacket in 1847. One of Walsh's watercolours, View of Sydney, which he painted around 1853, is held by the National Library of Australia. In 1855 Walsh was a member of the newly formed Fine Arts Society, of which Martens was president. In 1872, his watercolour drawing "Asia in a Cyclone" was exhibited in the fine arts section of the New South Wales Agricultural Society's annual show.

Walsh got on well with Bishop Broughton who shared his High Church leanings. He received a Lambeth MA issued by the Archbishop of Canterbury on Broughton's recommendation in 1843. Broughton also appointed Walsh as one of the first Canons of St Andrew's Cathedral in 1852. Their closeness sometimes caused problems when controversies arose, such as when, in 1848, two Sydney Anglican clergy resigned their licenses having announced their conversion to the Roman Catholic Church. One was Thomas Cooper Makinson (1809-1893), then locum tenens of St Peter's, Cook's River, the other was Robert Knox Sconce (1818-1852), the incumbent of St Andrew's, Sydney. The Sydney conversions were less than three years after one of the leading Tractarians at Oxford, John Henry Newman, seceded to Rome in 1845. Sconce's conversion caused embarrassment for Walsh as the chief proponent of Tractarian views in Sydney as well as for Broughton, whose close relationship with and support for Walsh was widely known. Sconce had been a close friend and confidant of Walsh. Walsh's support for his Bishop meant having to denounce publicly Sconce's dabbling with Roman Catholic devotional material, an exercise that Walsh was also alleged to have taken part in. Walsh preached and published a sermon, "Our duty under recent perversions to the Church of Rome".

With the foundation of the University of Sydney in 1850, Walsh opposed Anglican involvement so long as it remained a secular university. He became a senior fellow of St Paul's College, an Anglican residential college affiliated with the University, when it was founded in 1856.

Walsh's influence in the Diocese declined following the death of Bishop Broughton and the arrival of the evangelical Bishop Frederic Barker in 1855. To an extent he became an opposition figure. Jane Barker, the wife of Bishop Barker, first met Walsh in 1855 and referred to him as the "Bishop" of the High Church party and observed that he had "great influence with them".

== Ministry in Lichfield ==
Walsh visited England in 1865 and stayed on, eventually resigning from Christ Church in 1867 so that he could assist Bishop George Augustus Selwyn (lately translated from New Zealand to Lichfield) to "act as a corresponding secretary to carry on a communication between all the branches of the Anglican Communion" - a task allotted Selwyn by the Lambeth Conference in 1867.

In March 1868, Walsh was appointed perpetual curate of Whittington in Derbyshire and a Prebendary of Lichfield Cathedral. He held the livings of Alrewas in Staffordshire (1869-1875) and St Bartholomew, Penn, near Wolverhampton, in Staffordshire (1875-1880). Bishop Selwyn's son, John Selwyn (later Bishop of Melanesia), was his curate at Alrewas.

== Final years and legacy ==
George Selwyn died in 1878 and Walsh returned to the antipodes less than two years later. He arrived in Sydney in 1880 via Norfolk Island where, on 7 December 1880, his old curate John Selwyn, now Bishop of Melanesia, consecrated St Barnabas' Chapel. It was the memorial to the martyred first Bishop of Melanesia, John Coleridge Patteson (1827-1871). Walsh read the morning service at St Barnabas’ on 8 December 1880.

His final appointment was as first Rector of Bodalla on the Mort family's estate in southern New South Wales. A church, All Saints, was in the course of construction at Bodalla, the architect being Walsh's old friend, Edmund Blacket. It was one of Blacket's last commissions before his death in 1883. The press reported that Walsh "undertook no regular duty" after his return to New South Wales, but "remained mostly at Bodalla, only occasionally visiting his friends in Sydney".

Walsh resigned his English positions in 1882 and died at Bodalla on 17 December 1882. He was buried at Bodalla close to the grave of his old friend T S Mort. A separate funeral service was held at Christ Church St Laurence, the preacher being his former curate, Bishop Selwyn of Melanesia.

Walsh's obituary in the Australian Churchman said: "Canon Walsh was one of the foremost to inaugurate a better state of things in this respect proclaiming to his large and influential congregation the distinctive tenets of the Church of England: he led them to value order, reverence and brightness in all the surroundings of the service of God in the Sanctuary and to worship him ‘in the beauty of holiness’."
