= Gerard D'Arcy-Irvine =

British-born Anglican assistant bishop (1862–1932)

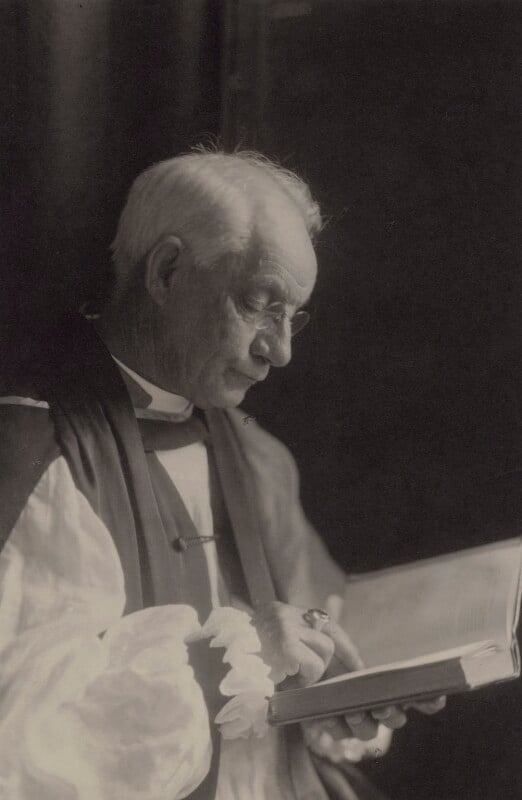
D'Arcy-Irvine, c. 1920s

Gerard Addington D'Arcy-Irvine (17 June 1862 – 18 April 1932) was a British Anglican priest who served as bishop coadjutor of Sydney, Australia from 1926 to 1932.

D'Arcy-Irving was born in Wandsworth, London, into an ecclesiastical family and educated at Napier Grammar School and Moore College. He was ordained in 1885 and began his ordained ministry as a curate at St Stephen's, Newtown, Sydney and St John's, Parramatta. He was then an incumbent at St Matthew's, Windsor, SS Simon and Jude's Bowral, St Michael's, Wollongong, Holy Trinity (Garrison) Church, Sydney and St Michael's Vaucluse and Rose Bay. In 1908 he became Archdeacon of Cumberland and in 1917 vicar general of the Sydney diocese. He was elevated to the episcopate in 1926 and died on 18 April 1932.
