= Jane McGrath =

British-Australian cancer support campaigner (1966–2008)

- Born: Jane Louise Steele; 4 May 1966; Paignton, Devon, England
- Died: 22 June 2008 (aged 42); Cronulla, New South Wales, Australia
- Cause of death: Breast cancer
- Known for: Cancer support campaigner/activist
- Spouse: Glenn McGrath (m. 1999)
- Children: 2
- Parent(s): Roy Steele (father); Jen Steele (mother)

Jane Louise McGrath AM (née Steele; 4 May 1966 – 22 June 2008) was an English-Australian cancer support campaigner, and the wife of former Australian cricket fast bowler Glenn McGrath.

== Background ==
Jane Louise Steele was born on 4 May 1966 to Jen and Roy Steele, a newsagent (since retired) in Paignton in the English county of Devon. She was working as a flight attendant for Virgin Atlantic when she met her future husband in a Hong Kong nightclub in 1995. They married in 1999 at the Garrison Church and had two children. She became an Australian citizen on Australia Day, 26 January 2002. McGrath was made a Member of the Order of Australia (AM) on 26 January 2008 for service to community health through support for women with breast cancer and the establishment of the McGrath Foundation.

== Cancer ==
McGrath first learned she had breast cancer in August 1997 at the age of 31. Following a mastectomy, chemotherapy and radiotherapy, she was deemed cancer-free by June 1998. Despite fears that cancer treatment may have left her sterile, she later gave birth to two children who were both breast-fed. In 2003, McGrath was diagnosed with metastatic disease in her bones. In 2004, she appeared with her husband on Andrew Denton's Enough Rope on the ABC, describing her work for the foundation and her personal experiences.

In early 2006, brain metastasis was found and by May, she was undergoing radiation treatment at three-week intervals. The tumour was found and successfully removed. At the time, she lost her hair and became depressed, but again went into remission and continued her work with the foundation. She became severely ill in mid-June 2008 and died on the morning of 22 June at her Cronulla home; she was 42. McGrath's funeral was held at the Garrison Church.

== McGrath Foundation ==
In 2005, Glenn and Jane McGrath founded the McGrath Foundation, a charitable organisation dedicated to raising money to fund breast care nurses in rural and regional Australia, and to increase breast awareness in young women. As of May 2022, 177 McGrath breast care nurses have been placed in communities throughout Australia, supporting over 67,000 Australian families experiencing breast cancer.

The third day of the first Sydney Test cricket match at the Sydney Cricket Ground each year is now known as Jane McGrath Day, where money is raised for the McGrath Foundation. Spectators at the SCG wear pink to show their support, and sponsor logos in various places are also recoloured pink for the match. The Ladies Stand is also temporarily renamed The Jane McGrath Stand for the day.

On 5 January 2013, Australian Prime Minister Julia Gillard announced an $18.5 million donation to the McGrath Foundation from the Australian Government. The funding allowed all 44 existing McGrath breast care nurse positions to continue and expand the program by 10 full-time equivalent places.
