= Charles Frederick Garnsey =

Church of England clergyman (1828–1894)

Charles Frederick Garnsey (15 November 1828 – 3 December 1894) was an Anglican priest and pioneer of Anglo-Catholicism in Australia.

Rev Charles Frederick Garnsey

== Early life ==
Charles Frederick Garnsey was born in Forest of Dean, Gloucestershire, the son of an evangelical clergyman, Thomas Rock Garnsey (1792–1847), the incumbent of Christ Church, Berry Hill. He was educated at Monmouth Grammar School.

Garnsey arrived in Australia in 1848 and tutored the children of Francis Nixon the Anglican Bishop of Tasmania. Nixon made him a Deacon in 1853.

A Freemason, Garnsey joined the Lodge of Hope in Launceston, in 1855. In New South Wales, he was a Worshipful Master of the Windsor Social Lodge No 275. He was Grand Chaplain at the formation of the Grand Lodge of New South Wales in 1877.

He continued work as a teacher and moved to Sydney in 1858, where he taught at Rev William Savigny's collegiate school at Cook's River. At this time, while a worshipper at Christ Church St Laurence, he met his future wife, Mary Emma Stiles (1837–1886), the daughter of Henry Tarlton Stiles, the incumbent of St Matthew's Anglican Church, Windsor.

== Ministry at Windsor ==
Garnsey promptly set up his own collegiate school at Windsor, in 1860, and married Mary Stiles in the same year.

In 1864, Bishop Frederic Barker ordained Garnsey priest. He became curate to his father-in-law and succeeded him at Windsor, upon Stiles’ death in 1867.

Under the influence of Bishop Nixon, Garnsey had become a high churchman and, as such, clashed with a group of low churchmen in Windsor, including the astronomer, John Tebbutt. Controversies included one, in 1864, about the introduction of Chope's Hymnal; one, in 1866, about the use of black drapes in the church during Lent; and another, in 1874, about the large cross that surmounted a memorial in the church to Captain William Blake.

At Windsor Garnsey gained a reputation for his heroic conduct during various floods, and a devastating fire in the town in 1874. In the flood of 1867, he and a helper rescued 35 people, and his residence accommodated about 200 people rendered homeless by the flood.

== Ministry in Sydney ==
In 1877, Garnsey was appointed curate at St James' King Street, Sydney to assist Canon Robert Allwood.

In 1878, Garnsey was appointed Rector of the neighbouring Sydney parish of Christ Church St Laurence, following the death of Canon George Vidal. At Christ Church, Garnsey initially continued the parish's High Church tradition. He established the Guild of St Laurence in 1882. The Guild supported important mission work in the slums that surrounded the church. He was active on the Denominational Schools Defence Committee, in 1880, and maintained his parish's large infants and primary schools after the withdrawal of state aid for denominational schools in 1882.

In December 1883, Garnsey travelled to England and, while there, observed the operation of Anglo-Catholic parishes. In Garnsey's absence, in April 1884, Alfred Barry arrived as Bishop of Sydney to succeed the evangelical Frederic Barker who had died in 1882. Barry's arrival saw an immediate change in ritual at Christ Church St Laurence, with weekly choral Eucharists being advertised. Changes gathered pace, particularly upon Garnsey's return in October 1884 and, by June 1885, the parish had adopted a cross on the altar, altar lights, a processional cross and banners, Eucharistic vestments, a daily Eucharist and a redesigned sanctuary and chancel that gave greater prominence to a new altar. One of Garnsey's sons later recalled the family's excitement when the tea chests of items purchased in England were opened and the contents unpacked. Some of the items were the first such ornaments and vestments used in an Anglican church in New South Wales.

Garnsey's wife, Mary, died in 1886 from typhoid fever contracted through her parish work. In 1887, Garnsey married Marion Laura Walker (1835–1927), the daughter of Thomas Walker (1791–1861) and Anna Elizabeth Blaxland. Marion was then 52 years old and previously unmarried. The Garnsey family record of her that “she was a kind and good person, but without the sparkle of his first wife”.

In 1890, Garnsey was accepted as an associate member of the English Church Union. He was also a member of the New South Wales Branch of the English Church Union, which had reconstituted itself, in 1890, from the local Society of St Alban the Martyr. In 1890–1892, he was editor of the Banner and Anglo-Catholic Review, which Garnsey founded with other Sydney high churchmen in opposition to three other Anglican journals.

Garnsey was a controversial figure in the Anglican Church in Sydney. For example, at the General Synod in 1881, he moved (and subsequently withdrew) a motion on the desirableness, where practicable, of carrying out the services of the church, as provided in the Book of Common Prayer. In the Synod of the Diocese of Sydney in 1887, he spoke against receiving a petition for the removal of the reredos in St Andrew's Cathedral, Sydney, and for a check on the progress of ritualism generally. He observed that the effect of the petition would be “to blast the Church of England in its custom and use throughout the known civilised world”, adding “The object of the petition was to remove from the Church of England anything in the shape of the delineation of figures of the Blessed Saviour, the apostles, Saints, and martyrs, and eventually even the stained glass windows. They would then restore the cathedral to the original fig-leaf barrenness of barbarian times.”

Yet, Garnsey's care for the poor and marginalised was unparalleled, with him attending places his brother clergy would never enter. He once exclaimed "Almighty God! Is a man’s soul not to go to Heaven because he died in a public house?" An alderman of Windsor recalled that Garnsey had once “divested himself of clothing on a wet day to give it to a poor man who sadly needed it”. On another occasion in Sydney, he helped a grieving family, among the poorest of his parishioners in Surry Hills, by constructing a coffin.

== Death and legacy ==
Garnsey died suddenly from a heart attack in the Christ Church parsonage, Pitt Street, Sydney, early on a Monday morning, after a Sunday on which he had preached at Christ Church St Laurence in the morning, Christ Church, Enmore in the evening, and given an address at the Benevolent Asylum in the afternoon.

He was interred at Waverley Cemetery, after a burial service at Christ Church at which the Primate of Australia, Bishop William Saumarez Smith spoke of Garnsey's “sterling earnestness” and stated that in spite of differences of opinion which all knew had existed between them in matters of church government, he was bound to admit that Garnsey abounded in the spirit of the Redeemer. Others who paid tribute included the Dean of Sydney, William Cowper, who said the parishioners would miss Garnsey's “kindly words, his warm grasp of the hand, his kindly help and practical Christianity”. The Rev George North Ash, of St. Augustine's Church, Neutral Bay, said that Garnsey “was a loyal and fearless exponent of those distinctive truths of the Catholic faith which it ever has been the glory of their Church to maintain and to assert. He never condescended to endeavour, for the sake of a false peace or an ephemeral popularity, to minimise, or to "explain away," those doctrines which are too often forgotten, or apologised for, by timid or colourless nominal Church adherents, in deference to the spirit of compromise and the demands of the age in which we live.”

A light in the Garnsey memorial window at Christ Church St Laurence, by the firm Lyon and Cottier, 1895.

In 1895, the Primate unveiled a memorial window to Garnsey at Christ Church St Laurence. Garnsey had made Christ Church St Laurence the leading Anglo-Catholic church in New South Wales, a status it built on in succeeding years.

Garnsey was survived by seven children to his first wife. A son, Arthur Henry Garnsey (1872–1944), also became a priest and was Warden of St Paul's College, University of Sydney (1916–1944) and a Canon of St Andrew's Cathedral, Sydney (1928–1944). A grandson, David Garnsey (1909–1996), was Bishop of Gippsland (1959–1974). Another son, George Leonard Garnsey (1881-1951) was a first class cricketer for New South Wales.
