= St Matthew's Anglican Church, Windsor =

St Matthew's Anglican Church
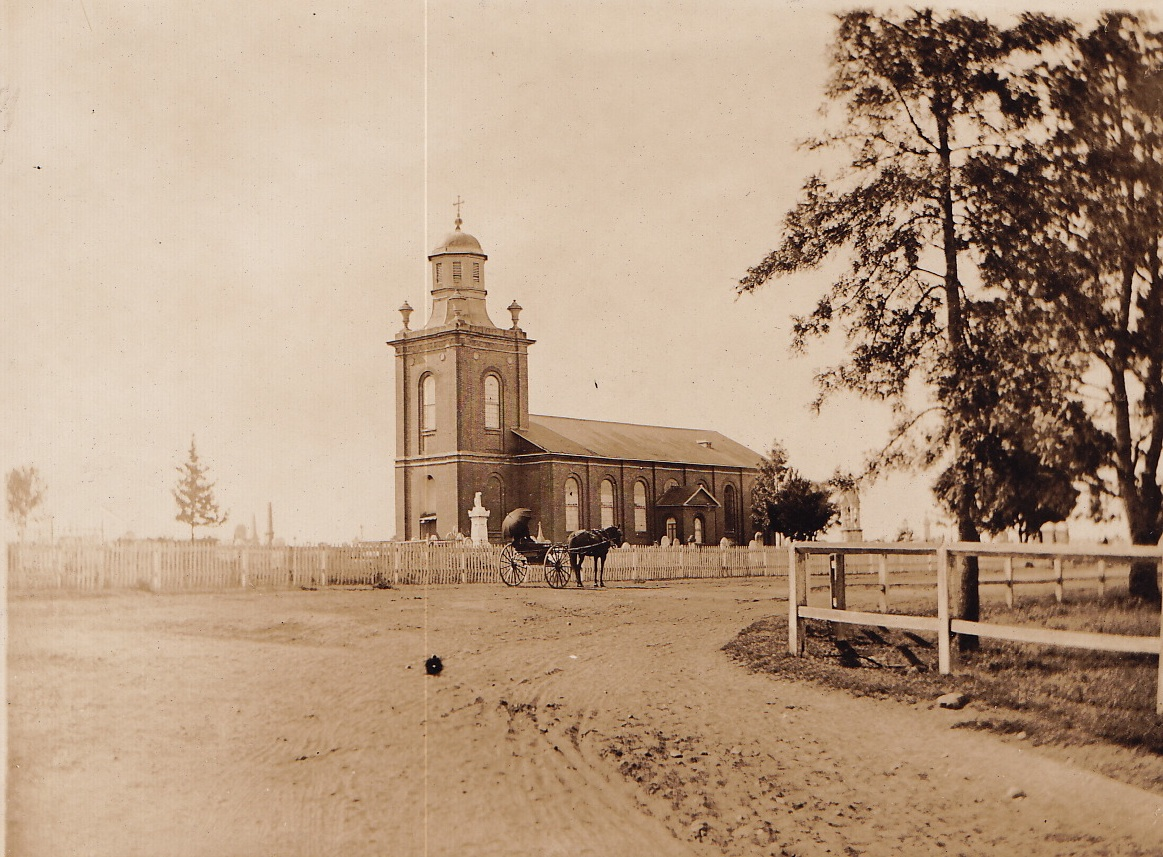
- St Matthew's Church, pictured in 1906

- Location in greater metropolitan Sydney
- 33°36′31″S 150°48′45″E
- Location: Moses Street, Windsor, City of Hawkesbury, New South Wales
- Country: Australia
- Denomination: Anglican
- Website: windsoranglican.asn.au/home

History
- Status: Church
- Consecrated: 8 December 1822 by Rev. Samuel Marsden

Architecture
- Functional status: Active
- Architect: Francis Greenway
- Architectural type: Georgian
- Years built: 1817–

New South Wales Heritage Register
- Official name: St. Matthew's Anglican Church, Rectory, Stables & Cemetery
- Type: State heritage (complex / group)
- Designated: 2 April 1999
- Reference no.: 15
- Type: Church
- Category: Religion
- Builders: Convict labour

St Matthew's Anglican Church is a heritage-listed Anglican church building located at Moses Street, Windsor, City of Hawkesbury, New South Wales, Australia. It was designed by Francis Greenway and built from 1817 by convict labour. The property is owned by the Anglican Church Property Trust. It was added to the New South Wales State Heritage Register on 2 April 1999.

== History ==
=== Indigenous history ===
The lower Hawkesbury was home to the Dharug people. The proximity to the Nepean River and South Creek qualifies it as a key area for food resources for indigenous groups. The Dharug and Darkinjung people called the river Deerubbin and it was a vital source of food and transport.

=== Colonial history ===
Governor Arthur Phillip explored the local area in search of suitable agricultural land in 1789 and discovered and named the Hawkesbury River after Baron Hawkesbury. This region played a significant role in the early development of the colony with European settlers established here by 1794. Situated on fertile floodplains and well known for its abundant agriculture, Green Hills (as it was originally called) supported the colony through desperate times. However, frequent flooding meant that the farmers along the riverbanks were often ruined.

In 1794, the land on which the church now stands was first alienated for European purposes in a grant made by Francis Grose of thirty acres to Samuel Wilcox, who named it Wilcox Farm. It is likely that land clearance and agricultural activities as well as some building works took place during this period and subsequently. In the early nineteenth century, the former Wilcox Farm was incorporated into a larger holding of 607 hectares (1,500 acres) known as Peninsula Farm.

Governor Lachlan Macquarie replaced Governor Bligh, taking up duty on 1 January 1810. Under his influence the colony prospered. His vision was for a free community, working in conjunction with the penal colony. He implemented an unrivalled public works program, completing 265 public buildings, establishing new public amenities and improving existing services such as roads. Under his leadership Hawkesbury district thrived. He visited the district on his first tour and recorded in his journal on 6 December 1810: "After dinner I christened the new townships...I gave the name of Windsor to the town intended to be erected in the district of the Green Hills...the township in the Richmond district I have named Richmond..." the district reminded Macquarie of those towns in England, whilst Castlereagh, Pitt Town and Wilberforce were named after English statesmen. These are often referred to as Macquarie's Five Towns. Their localities, chiefly Windsor and Richmond, became more permanent with streets, town square and public buildings.

=== St Matthew's Church ===
Tenders had been called in August 1816, plans had been drawn up, bricks had been made and material supplied. Henry Kitchen, builder, was paid a total of A£800 in the next two years for his work. But reports on the building's progress were disturbing, and finally, Macquarie requested Greenway to investigate the situation. To Greenway's mind, his plan was being ruined by poor materials and bad workmanship. He condemned the structure and recommended that it should be removed and the building commenced anew. A specially appointed committee also reached the same conclusion.

Greenway had appointed John Jones of Windsor as his building superintendent for St Matthew's. Jones allowed for upward of 200,000 bricks to be made on his land and in return received 202 hectares (500 acres) of land beyond the Blue Mountains, just south of Kelso. Governor Macquarie's prompt action in ordering the church to be pulled down and a fresh start must have spurred Greenway on to produce a new and grander design.

Macquarie's leadership was investigated by an enquiry into the colony's affairs and the Bigge Report concluded that a free and penal society could co-exist but with tighter controls on convict management. Governor Macquarie resigned and returned to England in 1822. Prior to departing the colony he visited the Hawkesbury with his successor Sir Thomas Brisbane. They inspected Francis Greenway's new St Matthew's Church as well as other public buildings in Windsor. The Hawkesbury inhabitants presented Macquarie with a public address which commended him on his administration. The residents requested Macquarie sit for a portrait and flattered by the request, he agreed. The painting was completed in England and returned to Windsor and has hung in the Windsor Court House since the 1820s, in the district where he was so highly esteemed.

The Rev. Samuel Marsden, principal Chaplain of the Colony, consecrated the Church on 8 December 1822 and the Hawkesbury settlers attended the service in large numbers. The porch was added to the southern side of the Church in 1857, temporarily obscuring Macquarie's large commemorative stone which was later discovered and placed on the outer wall of the porch

The Stables

The tenders for the "office-house" attached to the Rectory was advertised on 7 and 14 October 1824 respectively. Built by William Cox, local builder and developer, the stables were completed during 1825 from plans prepared by either Francis Greenway or Standish Harris. From church records it is conclusive that by the 1890, the stables were in a dilapidated state as outlined by complaints by the then rector, the Rev Gerard D'Arcy Irvine. It appears that repairs were undertaken during the 1890s and involved possibly the changing of the roof from shingles to iron. In 1891 an additional expenditure to paint seven doors and windows and coat the building with "Lime and Copperas" was incurred.

By 1936 the stables were again in a state of disrepair and there was a recommendation made to demolish them. The church Synod involved the then Professor of Architecture at the University of Sydney, Prof Leslie Wilkinson. It was decided not to demolish the stables, and the only works undertaken was the removal of a partition wall.

Verbal advice has dated as c. 1950, the removal of an internal brick wall of the coach-house to allow a car to be garaged and confirmed that in the 1970s the timber props were installed in an attempt to prevent further deterioration of the brick wall by Mrs Rawson from a personal legacy.

=== Restoration efforts ===
In 1965, the church was restored by the NSW Government and the National Trust of Australia with money raised by the Trust's women's committee, which had raised a substantial sum of money in a public appeal to assist the conservation of three properties: the church, Experiment Farm Cottage, and Lindesay.

In 2002-03, a federal heritage CHPP grant of $99,985 was awarded for Stained Glass Window Restoration.

In 2016 the Anglican Parish of St Matthews, Windsor has launched a restoration appeal for proposed works which include a new columbarium wall, restoring the Church tower and Rectory windows. The first stage aims to raise $400,000. Also in 2016 to celebrate 200 years since Governor Macquarie laid its foundation stone, the parish council commissioned a book on the Church, written by Ian Jack and Jan Barkley-Jack. The book was officially launched on 12 November 2016 by Professor The Hon. Dame Marie Bashir AD CVO.

== Description ==
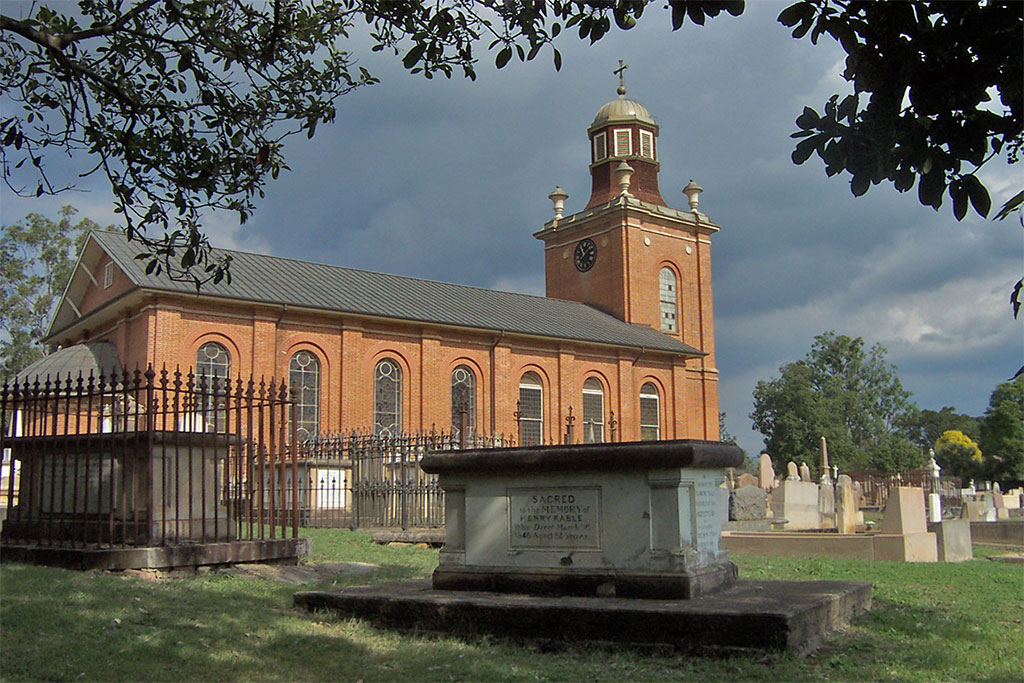
The grave of Henry Kable, located at St Matthew's Anglican Church, pictured in 2013.

St Matthew's Church

A fine Georgian church, constructed entirely by convict labour using sandstock bricks and sandstone. The dominant element is a sculptural square tower with octagonal cupola, axially arranged with a rectangular nave and semi circular apse. The interior contains much fine cedar joinery, including a coffered ceiling and gallery. Its siting is magnificent, on a hill above the town, and this reveals Greenway's sensitive appreciation of a building's relationship to the landscape.

Mrs William McQuade (of Fairfield, Windsor)'s monument is the imposing, and largest at the front entrance of St Matthew's Anglican Church, Windsor.

The church was reported to be in excellent physical condition as of May 2000. It retains good archaeological potential and has undergone less alteration than any other Greenway building.

St Matthew's Rectory

An exceptional two storey sandstock brick house of symmetrical design with central front door and elegant fanlight surmounted by a carved timber cornice. An unusual feature for a building of this type in Australia is the central brick pediment breaking the simple line of the hipped roof. Sandstone is used for narrow string courses and flagging at the front porch. The internal joinery pieces are of cedar, as are interior folding window shutters and an elegant semi circular staircase.

Cemetery

The cemetery is older than the Church and contains many tombstones commemorating the early settlers of the Windsor District. The oldest tombstone (1810) was laid in memory of Andrew Thompson.

The Stables

These are a rectangular two storey sand stock brick building with a hipped roof covered with corrugated iron. A loft divided into two rooms is located above the current four room form below. The footings are sandstone, the walls solid brick of Flemish bond externally and English internally. The openings on the Eastern side comprise a mixture of windows, doors and two loft openings. The western side contains an original window including remnant joinery pieces and two doors. There are circular sandstone ventilation opening in these walls. There are no openings in the southern and northern walls. A chimney abuts the south wall.

Much of the original fabric is still intact. This includes the sandstone flagging, most of the Flemish bond brick walls, one lathe and plaster ceiling, the entire roof structure except the shingles, one stall, one window and the majority of the doors, particularly the frames. Evidence of missing elements is clearly read from the remnant structure.

=== Modifications and dates ===
- 1817 – construction of Church commenced
- 1820 – Church completed
- 1822 – Rectory built

Stables

- c. 1840s – Change one of the carriage houses to living quarters by installing a brick partition wall changing a former window to a door and filling in the original double doors to the carriage house with a conventional door and window. A fireplace was also added to the front room.
- c. 1950s – Removal of the timber clad brick partition wall in the carriage house to create room for a car to be garaged in the former stables.
- c. 1970s – Timber propping of the external walls to prevent further collapse.

== Heritage listing ==
St Matthew's Anglican Church is one of the finest works of early Colonial architecture remaining in Australia. The rectory stables have rare and state significance because of their association with William Cox the builder, Francis Greenway or Standish Harris as the Government Architect responsible for the design and because they complete the St Matthew's Anglican Church precinct (all buildings completed between 1810–1825). The stables are a reminder of the indispensability of the horses for nineteenth century clergy. The rectory stables dominate the landscape above the Hawkesbury flood plain, they form a highly visible landmark precinct. In the past the community has resisted attempts to demolish the stables and in recent times have formed a committee to conserve the stables. The brickwork and roof of the stables are evidence of early technical knowledge and construction techniques of the colony. If attributed to Standish Harris it is the only structure remaining from his period as Government Architect, other than a wall.

St Matthew's Anglican Church was listed on the New South Wales State Heritage Register on 2 April 1999 having satisfied the following criteria.

The place is important in demonstrating the course, or pattern, of cultural or natural history in New South Wales.

Evidence of early settlement on the Cumberland Plain and of planning by Governor Macquarie. Consecrated by Samuel Marsden in 1822. The rectory stables has rare significance because of those involved in their design and erection. William Cox, the builder, was one of the principal building contractors and road makers in rural New South Wales in the Macquarie period and the 1820s. The design of the stables was the work of either Francis Greenway or of his successor as government architect, Standish Harris.

The place is important in demonstrating aesthetic characteristics and/or a high degree of creative or technical achievement in New South Wales.

A fine Georgian Church considered to be Francis Greenway's architectural masterpiece. It is one of the finest works of early Colonial architecture remaining in Australia. Rectory also a fine domestic work.

The stables are located above the floodplain of the Hawkesbury, with the Blue Mountains to the west, the sand stock brick stables, next to the rectory and near St Matthew's Anglican Church.

The place has a strong or special association with a particular community or cultural group in New South Wales for social, cultural or spiritual reasons.

Strong association with pioneer families and the history of the area. The Stables: as a domestic utility, barely visible from the roadway, for many years unlike the church or rectory, did not attract particular local esteem. In recent times however, concern among parishioners about the condition of the stables has let to the formation of a community committee specifically to be a task force for their conservation.

The place has potential to yield information that will contribute to an understanding of the cultural or natural history of New South Wales.

Cemetery has research potential. Stables: The construction, both from brickwork and roof, is significant evidence of William Cox's style and also of the specifications drawn up by the government architect, whether Greenway or Harris. If the building is by Harris, it assumes still higher research significances the only structure, other than a wall, which can be attributed to this much maligned architect.

The place possesses uncommon, rare or endangered aspects of the cultural or natural history of New South Wales.

The stables are the final essential element in the Anglican church complex at Windsor (cemetery, glebe, St Matthew's church, rectory and stables) completed between 1810 and 1825.

The place is important in demonstrating the principal characteristics of a class of cultural or natural places/environments in New South Wales.

Demonstrates early colonial settlement and its associated infrastructure. The stables are a physical reminder of the indispensability of the horse for a nineteenth century country clergyman performing parochial rounds and servicing outlying churches.

== Clergy ==
The following were ministers-in-charge of St Matthew’s, Windsor in the 19th and 20th centuries. They went by a variety of titles, including chaplain, incumbent, rector, and minister.

- 1810–1819 Robert Cartwright (1771–1856)
- 1819–1827 John Cross (1781–1858)
- 1828 Elijah Smith (1800–1870)
- 1829–1833 Joseph Docker (1793–1865)
- 1833–1867 Henry Tarlton Stiles (1808–1867)
- 1867–1876 Charles Frederick Garnsey (1827–1894)
- 1877–1878 Henry Archdall Langley (1840–1906), later Bishop of Bendigo.
- 1878–1885 Frederick William Stretton (1845–1885)
- 1885–1890 Arthur Russell Blacket (1848–1935)
- 1890–1893 Gerard Addington D’Arcy Irvine (1862–1932), later Bishop Coadjutor of Sydney.
- 1893–1904 Sydney Glanville Fielding (1856–1930)
- 1904–1906 Philip William Dowe (1858–1937)
- 1906–1936 Norman Lewis James Jenkyn (1872–1942), also Mayor of Windsor 1931–1932.
- 1936–1940 George Phillip Birk (1884–1956)
- 1940–1947 Charles Lindesay Williams (1887–1964)
- 1947–1950 Robert Thomson Hallahan (1895–1958)
- 1951–1954 Douglas Guthrie McCraw (1920–1977), later became a missionary pilot in Papua New Guinea.
- 1954–1960 William Frederick Carter (1924– )
- 1961–1980 Harold Rawson (1908–1996)
- 1980–1988 Leonard Mackay Abbott (1922–2023)
- 1988–1999 John Albert Butler (1944– )

== See also ==
- Australian non-residential architectural styles
- List of Anglican churches in the Diocese of Sydney
