= Church Act 1836 =

1836 law in the Colony of New South Wales

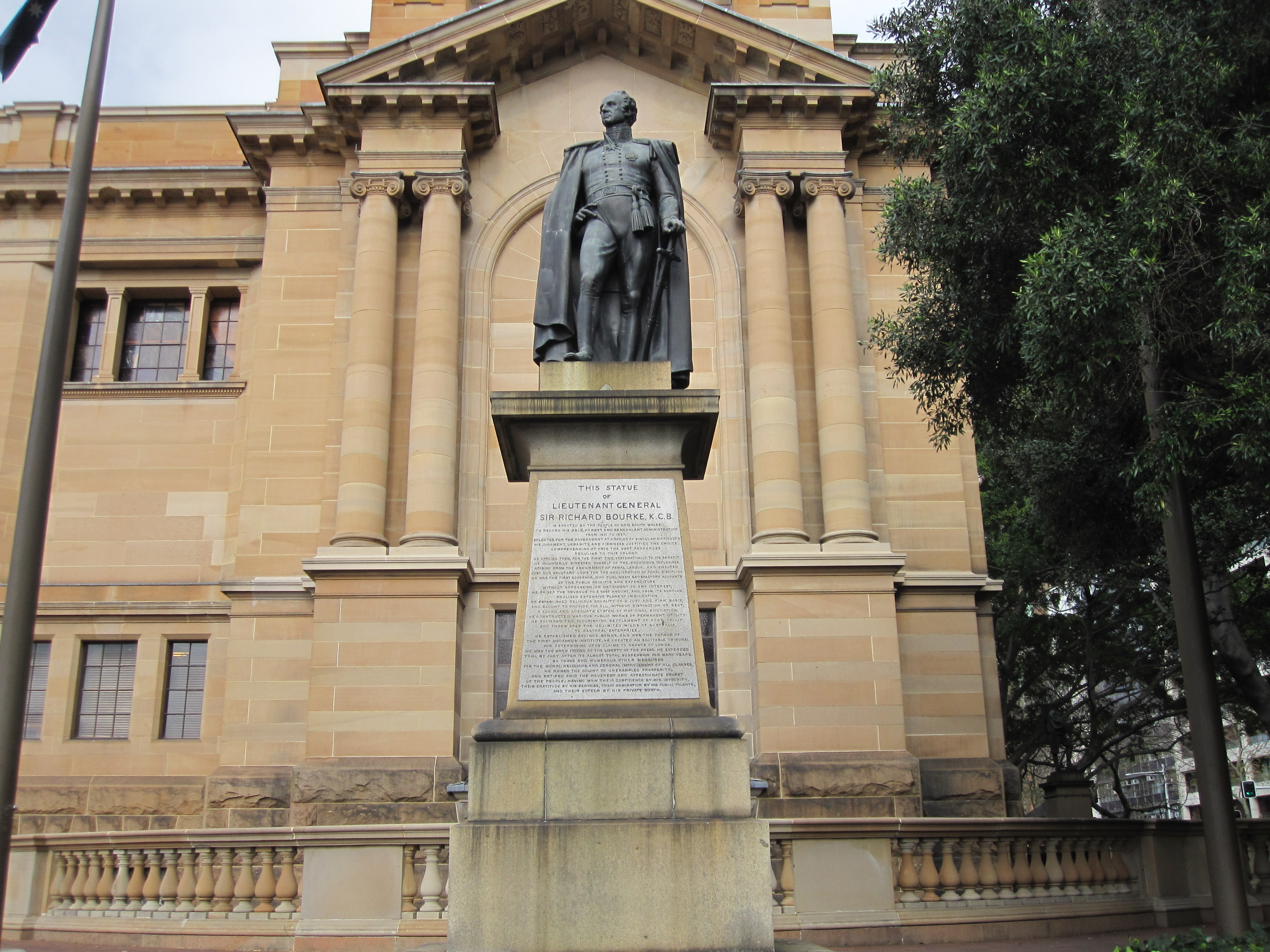
The statue of Sir Richard Bourke outside the State Library of New South Wales notes in its inscription that he "established religious equality on a just and firm basis".

The Church Act, also known as the Church Building Act, was a 1836 law in the Colony of New South Wales. It was drafted by John Plunkett and enacted by the Governor, Sir Richard Bourke. It was subtitled "An Act to promote the building of Churches and Chapels and to provide for the maintenance of Ministers of Religion in New South Wales."

The Act established equitable funding for Church of England, Church of Scotland, and Roman Catholic churches. It thus led to the effective disestablishment of the Church of England. Bourke later extended the provisions of the Act to Methodist and Baptist churches. The law did not extend, however, to Jews and other non-Christian religions; it took until August 1854 to extend government assistance to the Jewish community, an object advocated in the Legislative Council by William Wentworth and George Nichols.
