= Windsor Court House =

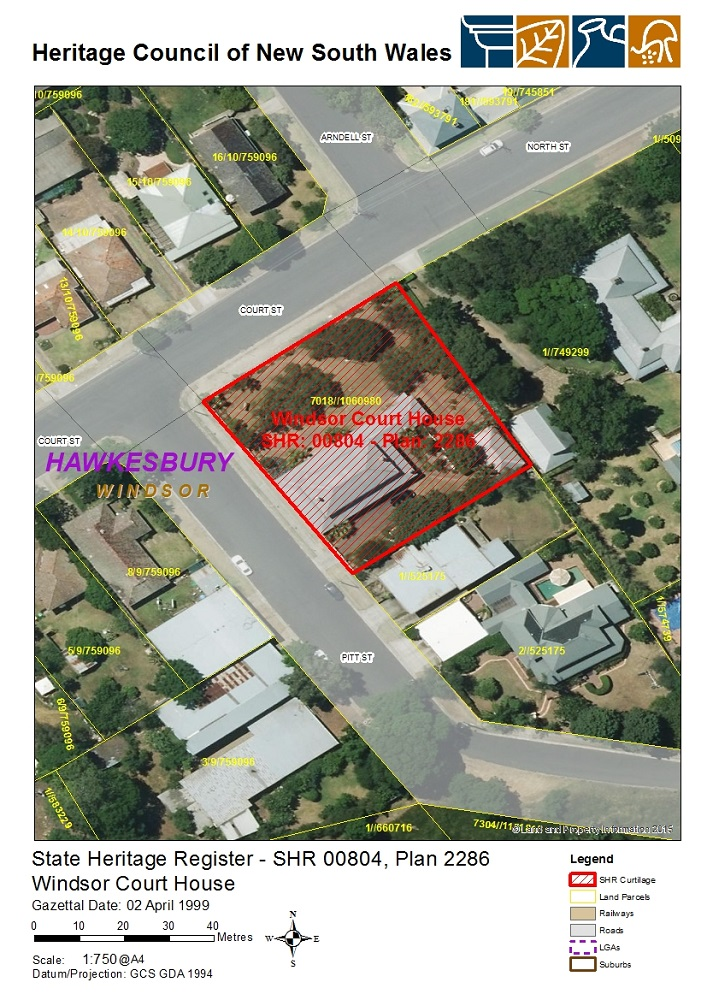
- Heritage boundaries

- Location within New South Wales Location within Australia
- 33.6055°S 150.8261°E
- Location: Court and Pitt Streets, Windsor, City of Hawkesbury, New South Wales, Australia

History
- Built: 1821–1822

Site notes
- Architect(s): Francis Greenway (original building); James Barnet (extension)

New South Wales Heritage Register
- Official name: Windsor Court House
- Type: state heritage (built)
- Designated: 2 April 1999
- Reference no.: 804
- Type: Courthouse
- Category: Law Enforcement
- Builders: William Cox

Windsor Court House is a heritage-listed courthouse at Court and Pitt Streets, Windsor, City of Hawkesbury, New South Wales, Australia. It was designed by Francis Greenway with a later extension by James Barnet and built from 1821 to 1822 by William Cox. It was added to the New South Wales State Heritage Register on 2 April 1999.

== History ==
The lower Hawkesbury was home to the Dharug people. The proximity to the Nepean River and South Creek qualifies it as a key area for food resources for indigenous groups. The Dharug and Darkinjung people called the river Deerubbin and it was a vital source of food and transport.

Governor Arthur Phillip explored the local area in search of suitable agricultural land in 1789 and discovered and named the Hawkesbury River after Baron Hawkesbury. This region played a significant role in the early development of the colony with European settlers established here by 1794. Situated on fertile floodplains and well known for its abundant agriculture, Green Hills (as it was originally called) supported the colony through desperate times. However, frequent flooding meant that the farmers along the riverbanks were often ruined.

In 1794, the land on which the courthouse stands was first alienated for European purposes in a grant made by Francis Grose of thirty acres to Samuel Wilcox, who named it Wilcox Farm. It is likely that land clearance and agricultural activities as well as some building works took place during this period and during the subsequent of occupation. The farm was subsequently incorporated into a larger holding of 1500 acres known as Peninsula Farm.

On 1 January 1810, Lachlan Macquarie replaced William Bligh as Governor of New South Wales. The colony prospered under his influence, implementing a significant public works program, completing 265 public buildings, establishing new public amenities and improving existing services such as roads. On 6 December 1810, he named five new towns in the Hawkesbury region - subsequently known as the Macquarie Towns - including Windsor. Following Macquarie's instigation, Windsor became a permanent township with streets, public buildings and a town square.

The Windsor Court House was designed by the Colonial Architect Francis Greenway in 1821, in response to Governor Macquarie's request. It was intended to replace an original timber court house, and despite economic restrictions, Governor Macquarie had no intention to settle for a weatherboard structure. Instead he called upon Greenway to submit designs for a small but substantial brick building.

The contract for its construction was awarded to William Cox in October 1821 for the sum of 1800 pounds, on the condition that the building be completed within fifteen months of the award of the contract. The court house was completed within the time specified using convict labour.

Macquarie's leadership was investigated by an enquiry into the colony's affairs and the Bigge Report concluded that a free and penal society could co-exist but with tighter controls on convict management. Governor Macquarie resigned and returned to England in 1822. Prior to departing the colony he visited the Hawkesbury with his successor Sir Thomas Brisbane. They inspected Francis Greenway's new St Matthew's Anglican Church as well as other public buildings in Windsor. The Hawkesbury inhabitants presented Macquarie with a public address which commended him on his administration. The residents requested Macquarie to sit for a portrait and flattered by the request, he agreed. The painting was completed in England and returned to Windsor and has hung in the Windsor Court House since the 1820s.

Repairs carried out in the 1840s and 50s included the re-shingling of the roof and other building works. Alterations made by Barnet in 1870s and 1882. The last recorded additions were in 1890. In 1961 restoration, renovation and alterations were made plus new toilet accommodation.

In 2000, Attorney-Generals' Department restored the fabric of the building, reversing earlier restoration work. The Courthouse had originally been cement rendered, but this had been removed in 1960, a move not beneficial to the building.

The courthouse was threatened with closure in 2014 due to state cuts to court funding, but survived after community concern at the likely impact of Windsor residents having to travel to Penrith to attend court. The number of sitting days were reduced to ten per month from 2015, down from sixteen in 2014. In 2017, it received a $160,000 upgrade to install audio-visual link functionality.

== Description ==
The Windsor Court House is one of the earliest surviving court house buildings in Australia. Designed in the Colonial Georgian style, it uses an adapted Palladian form with an enclosing front verandah entrance, a climatic adaptation. The building consists of one courtroom with front and back verandahs, ancillary rooms at each corner of the building and a late 19th century extension by Colonial Architect, James Barnet, in a garden setting. Classically inspired details include multi-panelled windows with flat sandstone lintels over.

Other accommodation includes Sheriff's Office, community legal centre office, Chamber, interview room, legal room, legal profession room and a Mmagistrate's room.

The Court House is constructed in face brick, with a sandstone base course and window headers. The roofs are clad in corrugated iron. The verandah is supported on timber posts. Interiors feature intact timber joinery and furniture.

The courthouse also houses a collection of moveable heritage, including furniture and fittings, ledgers and a celebrated portrait of Governor Macquarie commissioned on his departure from the colony in 1822 for seven guineas by grateful local residents in appreciation of his efforts for the area. The artist has been identified by the National Portrait Gallery of Scotland as most likely to have been Scottish artist Colvin Smith. It was restored for the bicentenary of Macquarie's arrival in the colony.

== Heritage listing ==
The Windsor Court House, a rare surviving Colonial Georgian public building that originally dates from the early 19th century. The building has a fine and impressive form which uses an adapted Palladian plan to suit the Australian climate. It is of considerable historical, social and aesthetic significance, as one of the earliest surviving Court House buildings in Australia.

The court house was insisted upon by Governor Macquarie, designed by Francis Greenway (himself originally a convict) and built by William Cox using convict labour. It is a combination and the result of all the forces directly at play during the Australia's early development.

Windsor Court House was listed on the New South Wales State Heritage Register on 2 April 1999 having satisfied the following criteria.

The place is important in demonstrating the course, or pattern, of cultural or natural history in New South Wales.

Windsor was the most prosperous and successful of the towns founded by Governor Macquarie. The Windsor Court House was commissioned in 1821 by Governor Macquarie to replace its, by then, dilapidated timber predecessor. In 1821 William Cox signed the contract, and agreed to build the court house within fifteen months from October of that year of a sum of 1,800 pounds under Greenway's supervision and using convict labour. In addition to its association with its designer, Francis Greenway, and its builder, William Cox, the court house represents the first steps in the prosperous growth and development of Windsor and the Hawkesbury region, and the efforts of Governor Macquarie to obtain the establishment of a modest but substantial brick court house despite the pressure to reduce government spending.

The place has a strong or special association with a person, or group of persons, of importance of cultural or natural history of New South Wales's history.

The Court House was commissioned by Governor Macquarie in 1821. It was designed by Francis Greenway, Colonial Architect, and appointed Civil Architect in 1816. Greenway also designed such buildings as the Hyde Park Barracks, Macquarie Lighthouse, the Parramatta Female Factory, St Matthew's Anglican Church in Windsor, St Luke's Anglican Church in Liverpool, and St James' Church and the Supreme Court in King Street Sydney.

The Court House is also associated with William Cox, its builder, who was an energetic and self improving colonist and contributed much to the development of the settlement. He arrived in 1800 as an officer of the New South Wales Corps, took up farming and in 1810 was appointed a magistrate in the Hawkesbury district. He employed about 50 convicts in agricultural and manufacturing activities on his property near Windsor. He also undertook building contracts for the government and in 1814 supervised the construction of the first road across the Blue Mountains.

The place is important in demonstrating aesthetic characteristics and/or a high degree of creative or technical achievement in New South Wales.

Windsor Court House is built in a simple Georgian style. The main room, the Court Room, is flanked front and back by stone flagged verandahs which form an essential part of the building's plain rectangular structure, and provide access to the ancillary rooms. The simplicity of the design is enhanced by the quality of the materials used - hand made sandstock bricks on a sandstone foundation. The windows and doorways have incised stone lintels and stone sills and recessed panels in the brickwork and the stone foundation. The interior is also simple with white walls and cedar panelling. The panelling behind the Magistrate's chair is embellished by a gilded coat of arms. The room is illuminated by light through high clerestory windows. Despite its simplicity in design, the most significant feature of this building is the adaptation by Greenway of his architectural skills and principles to suit the demands of an Australian climate. Greenway realised that architectural conditions in Australia, such as climate, building materials, and the lack of skilled professional labour and craftsmanship, were different from those in England and so he rearranged his design and thinking accordingly. With the exception of his Gothic designs, there is little or no decoration or ornament added to Greenway's designs. Everything in the design is a necessary part of the building.

The place has a strong or special association with a particular community or cultural group in New South Wales for social, cultural or spiritual reasons.

First commissioned in 1821 and completed within fifteen months, the Windsor Court House was built during politically and economically trying times (with pressure from England to reduce government spending) and amidst the turbulence of colonisation, the establishment of new settlements, a lack of skilled labour and other resources, and the unfamiliarity of a new and rather harsh climate. As such, the Windsor Court House is a symbol of the growth and successful development of Windsor as the most prosperous town established by Governor Macquarie and of the social, cultural and political forces of the early 1800s.
