= Nathaniel Lucas =

- Born: 1764; Leatherhead, Surrey, England
- Died: 28 April 1818 (aged 53–54); Liverpool, New South Wales, Australia
- Body discovered: River bank 5 May
- Burial place: Liverpool Cemetery (Apex Park)
- Occupation: Carpenter
- Spouse: Olivia Gascoigne
- Children: Ann, Mary, Sarah, William, Nathaniel, Olivia, John, James, George, Charles, Sarah, Mary Ann, and Thomas
- Parent(s): John Lucas & Mary Bradford

Nathaniel Lucas (1764–1818) was a convict transported to Australia on the First Fleet. His occupation was listed as carpenter.

== Life ==
Lucas was born in Leatherhead, Surrey, England, to parents John Lucas & Mary Bradford in 1764. Lucas was tried at the Old Bailey, London on 7 July 1784 for feloniously stealing clothing with a value of 40 shillings. Lucas was sentenced to transportation for seven years and left England on the Scarborough in May 1787.He left behind a wife in England when transported to Australia who was illiterate based on her signing an 'X' in place of her name on a marriage certificate located.

== Norfolk Island ==
After the First Fleet arrived at Port Jackson in January 1788, Phillip ordered Lieutenant Philip Gidley King to lead a party of fifteen convicts (9 men and 6 women) and seven free men to take control of Norfolk Island and prepare for its commercial development. Lucas was aboard HMS Supply, which arrived at Norfolk on 6 March 1788. On board Supply Nathaniel met Olivia Gascoigne (b. 1763 - d. 12 Jun 1830) whom he married on 5 November 1791, on Norfolk Island. Nathaniel and Olivia had thirteen children, although twins (Sarah and Mary) were killed at the age of two years when a large Norfolk Island Pine fell on the Lucas house.

In 1791 he received a grant of fifteen acres (6.1 ha) and in 1793 purchased another sixty acres (24 ha) from Charles Heritage, a former marine. Lucas took up farming and in August 1802 sold wheat, maize and pork worth £450 to the government stores on the island.

On 22 May 1802, Lucas was appointed Master Carpenter at Norfolk Island.

== New South Wales ==
In April 1805, Lucas returned with his family to Sydney in the Investigator. The ship carried materials for a government windmill which Lucas was to erect in Sydney, and he was allowed to carry materials for another windmill for himself. Nathaniel also brought several pairs of capital mill stones.

The Sydney Gazette and New South Wales Advertiser. Dated 23 June 1805.
An excellent Post Mill, the first that has been erected in the settlement is now completed by Mr Nathaniel Lucas, behind Back Row East. It was undertaken and finished within the space of six weeks; has been for several weeks at work, is capable of grinding, with a sufficiency of wind, upwards of six bushels per hour, which was last week accomplished for 12 hours successively.

In 1808, Nathaniel was appointed superintendent of carpenters in Sydney and held this position until his retirement in December 1814.

3 Jan 1810 Nathaniel was noted to be on the list of persons holding civil and military employment at Sydney and settlements adjacent, as Superintendent of Carpenters.

From 1810 until his death, Nathaniel appears on numerous Colonial Secretary's documents. The majority of these documents refer to Nathaniel surveying land or property and constructing or repairing various structures.

1812, saw the completion of a Post Windmill behind the Battery at Dawes Point. The price of grinding wheat into flour was fifteen pence per bushel, if brought and taken away by the owners of the wheat, or eighteen pence per bushel if brought and taken away by the owners of the Mill.

During the construction of the St Luke's Church Liverpool in 1818, which was designed by Francis Greenway, Greenway alleged that Lucas was much addicted to the bottle and that he was using very poor stone at the church.

== Death ==
After some days of being noticed absent, his body was discovered on the bank of a local river. It was determined he had been there about six days.

== See also ==
- Lucas Watermills Archaeological Sites
