= 101 George Street, The Rocks =

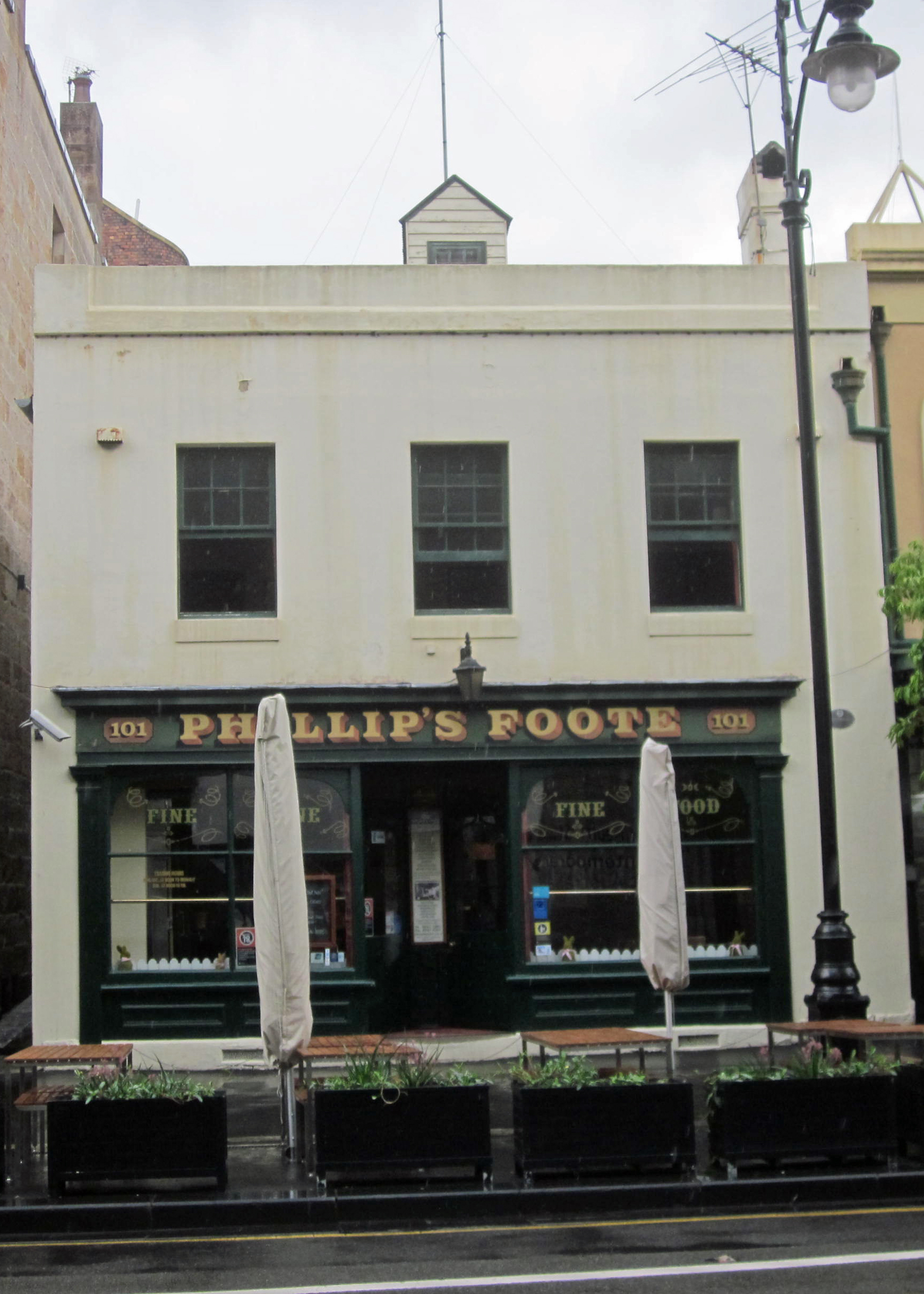
- 101 George Street, The Rocks

- Location within Sydney Location within Australia
- 33.8596°S 151.2085°E
- Location: 101 George Street, The Rocks, City of Sydney, New South Wales, Australia

History
- Built: 1838

Site notes
- Architect: William Reynolds
- Architectural style: Victorian Regency
- Owner: Property NSW
- Website: www.phillipsfoote.com.au

New South Wales Heritage Register
- Official name: Shop – Phillip's Foote Restaurant; Phillips Foote Restaurant
- Type: State heritage (built)
- Designated: 10 May 2002
- Reference no.: 1580
- Type: Inn/Tavern
- Category: Commercial

101 George Street, The Rocks is a heritage-listed restaurant and former house and shop located at 101 George Street, in the inner city Sydney suburb of The Rocks in the City of Sydney local government area of New South Wales, Australia. It was designed by William Reynolds and built during 1838. It is also known as Phillips Foote Restaurant or Phillip's Foote Restaurant. The property is owned by Property NSW, an agency of the Government of New South Wales. It was added to the New South Wales State Heritage Register on 10 May 2002.

== History ==
=== Ownership form 1800s to 1900 ===
The first development on the subject site took place in relation to the Assistant Surgeon's residence which was later occupied by Francis Greenway. Although the subject site appears to have been undeveloped, the site contained a wall associated with the residence. Following Frederic Wright Unwin's acquisition of the legal title to the land, known as Allotment 12, Section 84 in the town plan of Sydney, he registered a 21-year lease with William Reynolds, who had recently constructed a building on the leased land, described in the 1838 leasehold document as "the messuage or tenement thereon lately erected and built by the said William Reynolds". Reynolds may have informally leased the land from Unwin prior to erecting the building on it. He had already acquired the land fronting Harrington Street to the west, where he built a number of cottages in the 1820s.

Reynolds arrived in Australia in 1817 to serve a life sentence. He received a Ticket of Leave about 1826 and a conditional pardon in 1835. About the same time, possibly in response to a housing shortage in the 1840s, Reynolds constructed two rows of buildings in an L-shape fronting present-day Suez Canal as well as a right of way on land he owned. Another more substantial building was erected by Reynolds to the rear of the present-day Phillip's Foote building fronting George Street. These buildings were described by 'Old Chum': 'Off the [Suez] "Canal" was a blind court with some half dozen houses occupied by, to all appearances, some of the roughest of the rough.'

Rate records of the building fronting George Street dating to 1845 show that it was a two-storey brick residence of nine rooms, with an attic and shingled roof. An 1841 plan labels the site as 'Mr Chapman's Butcher Shop'.

The present-day Phillip's Foote building fronting George Street, after changing hands a number of times in the 1840s and 1850s, came to be owned and occupied from c. 1858 by William Yeoman (1833–1886), Painter/Glazier/Plumber. Yeoman leased the building to Thomas Playfair, butcher, between 1869 and 1886. Playfair (1832–1893) was elected to the City Council as a representative of the Gipps ward in 1875, and served as an alderman until 1893. He was mayor in 1885. Among his achievements with the Council were the widening of George Street North and the establishment of the Homebush sale yards as an alternative to the Glebe Island abattoirs in 1882. He advocated a better city water supply and is remembered as someone who 'instead of trying to sink the shop and kick away the ladder by which he rose, he stayed where he had always lived The Rocks, long enough to earn the respect and love of his neighbours.'

Playfair moved to 103 George Street about 1887, and the Phillip's Foote building was converted to an oyster saloon under the management of Frederick Rossich (also referred to as Bossich). Under the ownership of John Gill from 1885 and the State government from 1901, the place continued as an oyster saloon until 1906 under several different proprietors, all of whom migrated from the region of Dalmatia, Austria (presently Croatia). Most of them became naturalised Australians after Federation. In 1905, Giuseppe Nardi took over the oyster saloon, and in 1906, the place was listed in the Sands Directory as both an oyster saloon and wine bar. Nardi arrived in Australia as one of the survivors of the Marquis de Rays' ill-fated attempt to colonise part of New Guinea in 1880. As the ship's supplies diminished and disease felled numerous passengers, an attempt to reach Australia for provisions was thwarted when their ship in disrepair. Anchored off Nouméa, the surviving passengers on the ship were rescued and brought to New South Wales for settlement. Eventually the surviving families' settlement on the North Coast came to be known as New Italy.

=== Ownership from 1901 to 1970s ===
Giuseppe Meani, an Italian who was naturalised in 1903, succeeded Nardi as proprietor of the wine bar between 1906 and 1909. He was followed by Casper Schelling (1909–1912), I. R. Tolamini (1913–1915), and Alfret Meynet and his wife (1915–1920). Pesman and Kevin in A History of Italian Settlement in New South Wales note the attractions of operating a small independent business to migrant Italians, which may be said to apply equally to migrants from Dalmatia. Small businesses require little capital outlay, and could be operated economically with the use of family labour. Living on the premises reduced the requirement to navigate in the English language. Where job prospects for migrants amounted to menial labour or dangerous work, running one's own business provided a self-determined means of income, and generally allayed exposure to the hostilities and attitudes of bosses and anti-immigration campaigners.

From 1922, the ground and first floor were tenanted by a number of manufacturing companies, agents, and a newsagent. This trend continued until at least 1933 (when the Sands Directory ceased). From 1943, John J. Cohen rented the premises for the use of repairing musical instruments at £/1/0 a week. Cohen's lease continued until his death in 1965, when his wife took over the lease. Their business was called "Harmony House" and operated at 177 George Street, while they used part of 101 George Street as an office, and sub-let part to Collopy & Co. Although full tenancy records for 101 George Street are not available, reference is made in 1965 to the lease of the top floor (probably referring to the first floor) by A. J. Robb and its occupation by the Merchant Navy Allied War Service Association, which at times held functions with up to 40 people in attendance. The structure of the top floor was considered dangerous enough in 1965 to terminate the lease.

Rita Cohen of Harmony House continued to lease at least part of the ground floor while the condition of the building gradually worsened, according to condition reports carried out periodically by the Maritime Services Board. In 1967, the iron roof and box gutters were considered beyond repair, and water entering the roof caused the electric wiring to short circuit. Not surprisingly, Rita Cohen terminated her tenancy in the same year, and the building sat empty as the Sydney Cove Authority's plans for redevelopment were waylaid by the Green Bans efforts.

Internal memos in the early 1970s show that the Authority considered demolition of the building to be the best course of action, however they held concerns as to what the reaction to demolition would be by groups such as the "Save the Rocks" committee. An engineer reported on the bowing and cracking of the front façade in 1970, and stated that movement had taken place over a long period and did not require urgent demolition for public safety. Props were the preferred solution, and the building was temporarily braced against its neighbour across Suez Canal.

=== Ownership since 1970s ===
In 1971, the Authority heard complaints from the tenant at 99 George Street about water seeping from 101 George Street into her basement. Water was found to be standing 1 to 1 metre (3 to 4 ft) deep in the cellar of the Phillip's Foote building. Shortly thereafter, the City Health Department ordered that the "accumulation of miscellaneous rubbish, including scrap wood, scrap iron, papers, empty bottles, tins and vegetative matter which is likely to afford harbourage for vermin" be removed from the premises. The Authority hired a contractor to carry out the order, clean the interior of the building generally, remove the existing cast iron fireplaces for storage at the Authority's offices, board up all entrances, and to demolish the timber and corrugated iron shed abutting the northern brick wall of the yard and the timber frame in the southeast corner of the yard.

In 1973, demolition of the building was again considered by the Authority, as it had become "something of an eyesore and has [been] so for the past six years or so." However, a memo by the Professional Services Manager stated that the building should be retained because of its contribution to the block bounded by George, Argyle, and Harrington Streets. The building itself "does not have any historical merit, it is considered to be an important element in the whole." About the same time the firm of Dredge & Evans, via their architect Philip Cox, sought a tenancy in The Rocks area to transfer their dormant Australian Wine License. The Sydney Cove Redevelopment Authority hesitated in offering any more than a three-year lease because of uncertainty as to the building's future, the lack of money to restore it for the short term, and the absence of any survey plan for the area, which would be required for registering a lease of any more than three years with the Registrar-General.

Dredge & Evans took a tenancy at will and began renovations to the building in July 1974. The work involved gutting both the Phillip's Foote building and the Cook House to the rear, and the near-complete rebuilding of the Phillip's Foote building front and rear walls. Notes on the approved Building Application plans indicate that the external walls were to be "dismantled with care saving building materials which may be reused in the reconstruction." The four buildings to the north of the Phillip's Foote building were found to be slipping and pushing against 101 George Street. A bulwark was required to keep No. 101 vertical, and to stop the neighbours from slipping against it. A bar, previously located at Playfair's Buildings, Harrington Street (which was demolished for construction of Clocktower Square) was installed in the front room of the building. Having spent $220,000 on the renovations, Dredge & Evans opened the Phillip's Foote wine bar and restaurant in 1976 and reported in May of the same year that they served 200 to 700 meals a day, and were open seven days a week. Their trading capacity was limited by their usable floor area, and Authority approved their expansion into the area of the former Yeoman's Store building to the north (which had already been demolished in the early 20th century). The work was documented and carried out in 1977. New openings were made in the yard wall at the back of the Phillip's Foote building and in the north wall of the Cook House in order to access a new roofed verandah which opened into a courtyard dining area. About the same time, the Authority were restoring the stone flagging of Greenway Lane. Creating the opening in the yard wall enabled the flagging work to be carried through the Phillip's Foote outdoor dining areas to access Suez Canal for the first time in the history of the site.

Phillip's Foote continues to be operated by the company which carried out the renovation work.

== Description ==
No. 101 George Street is a plain two storey brick shop and residence, originally built in 1838. The building has been subject to modifications since but generally in a sympathetic manner. It has a simple early Victorian Regency style shopfront.

Style: Georgian; Storeys: 2, plus attic and basement; Roof Cladding: Iron sheeting; Floor Frame: Timber

=== Condition ===
As at 5 March 2009, Archaeology Assessment Condition: Partly disturbed. Assessment Basis: Terraced into hill slope at rear. Cellars below. However extant archaeological resource may exist form the date of the building's construction.

== Heritage listing ==
As at 31 March 2011, the Phillip's Foote Restaurant and site are of State heritage significance for their aesthetic, historical and scientific cultural values. The site and building are also of State heritage significance for their contribution to The Rocks area which is of State Heritage significance in its own right.

The simple Victorian Regency shopfront of the Phillip's Foote Restaurant contributes to the aesthetic and historic diversity of the George Street streetscape.

The site and buildings at 101 George Street, The Rocks, are of heritage significance for the State of NSW for their historic and aesthetic contribution to The Rocks area, which, on the whole, is of State heritage significance. Both the Phillip's Foote building and the Cook House make important aesthetic contributions to the streetscapes of George Street, the Suez Canal, Nurses Walk, and Greenway Lane. The Phillip's Foote building, a good representative example of a simple two-storey commercial building, is of historic significance as a site continuously used for retail and commercial purposes since its construction in 1838. The reconstruction works carried out in the 1970s under Philip Cox, architect, are of value for their ability to interpret the history and early character of the buildings.

101 George Street, The Rocks was listed on the New South Wales State Heritage Register on 10 May 2002 having satisfied the following criteria.

The place is important in demonstrating the course, or pattern, of cultural or natural history in New South Wales.

The site of 101 George Street is historically significant as a site continuously occupied since 1788. The Phillip's Foote building, constructed in 1838, is of significance as part of the early commercial development of The Rocks area, with a history of tenancies typical of the area's association with shipping and wharfage, including a shipping providore, oyster saloon, wine bar, shipping agent, and commission agent. In the evolution of The Rocks, the Phillip's Foote building is of some significance as the first building to be subject of major renovations following the Green Bans' halting of redevelopment plans for the area.

The place has a strong or special association with a person, or group of persons, of importance of cultural or natural history of New South Wales's history.

The Phillip's Foote building and site is associated with a number of former owners and occupants of note, including Frederic Wright Unwin (solicitor, owner of site c. 1838–1846), William Reynolds (blacksmith, lessee of site 1838–1859), William Yeoman (plumber and painter, owner/occupant c. 1858–1868), Thomas Playfair (butcher, influential alderman in City of Sydney Council between 1875 and 1893, lessee of site 1869–1886). Between 1887 and 1920, the place was operated as an oyster saloon and later a wine bar by a succession of European immigrants from Dalmatia (present-day Croatia) and Italy, a history which is significant in reflecting aspects of migration to Australia from Europe.

The place is important in demonstrating aesthetic characteristics and/or a high degree of creative or technical achievement in New South Wales.

Although substantially rebuilt in the mid-1970s, the Phillip's Foote building is of some aesthetic quality as a plain two storey shop with glazed, recessed shopfront typical of the 19th century Victorian Italianate. The Phillip's Foote building makes an important contribution to the streetscape of George Street, and is of significance in continuing the uniform character of the smaller scale retail shop buildings found in The Rocks. The Cook House makes an important contribution to the confined character of the Nurses Walk / Greenway Lane pedestrian thoroughfare as a terminating point in views to the north along Nurses Walk. Both the Cook House and Phillip's Foote are significant in defining the "walled" nature of Suez Canal, which, together with Nurses Walk and Greenway Lane, are highly significant as evocations of the colonial townscape of The Rocks.

The place has a strong or special association with a particular community or cultural group in New South Wales for social, cultural or spiritual reasons.

As part of The Rocks area, 101 George Street is held in some esteem by individuals and groups who are interested in Sydney's history and heritage.

The place has potential to yield information that will contribute to an understanding of the cultural or natural history of New South Wales.

The site has some research potential of significance to reveal evidence of the previous occupation of the site from c1788, when the Assistant Surgeon's residence, later occupied by Francis Greenway, was built nearby.

The place possesses uncommon, rare or endangered aspects of the cultural or natural history of New South Wales.

The place possesses a degree of rarity as the first site to be the subject of heritage renovations/reconstructions in the 1970s, when the plans of the Sydney Cove Redevelopment Authority to raze The Rocks for redevelopment were still in place.

The place is important in demonstrating the principal characteristics of a class of cultural or natural places/environments in New South Wales.

The scale and streetscape character of the Phillip's Foote building is representative of early 19th commercial building in The Rocks as a plain two-storey shop with residence.

== See also ==
- 95–99 George Street
- 103 George Street
