= 103 George Street, The Rocks =

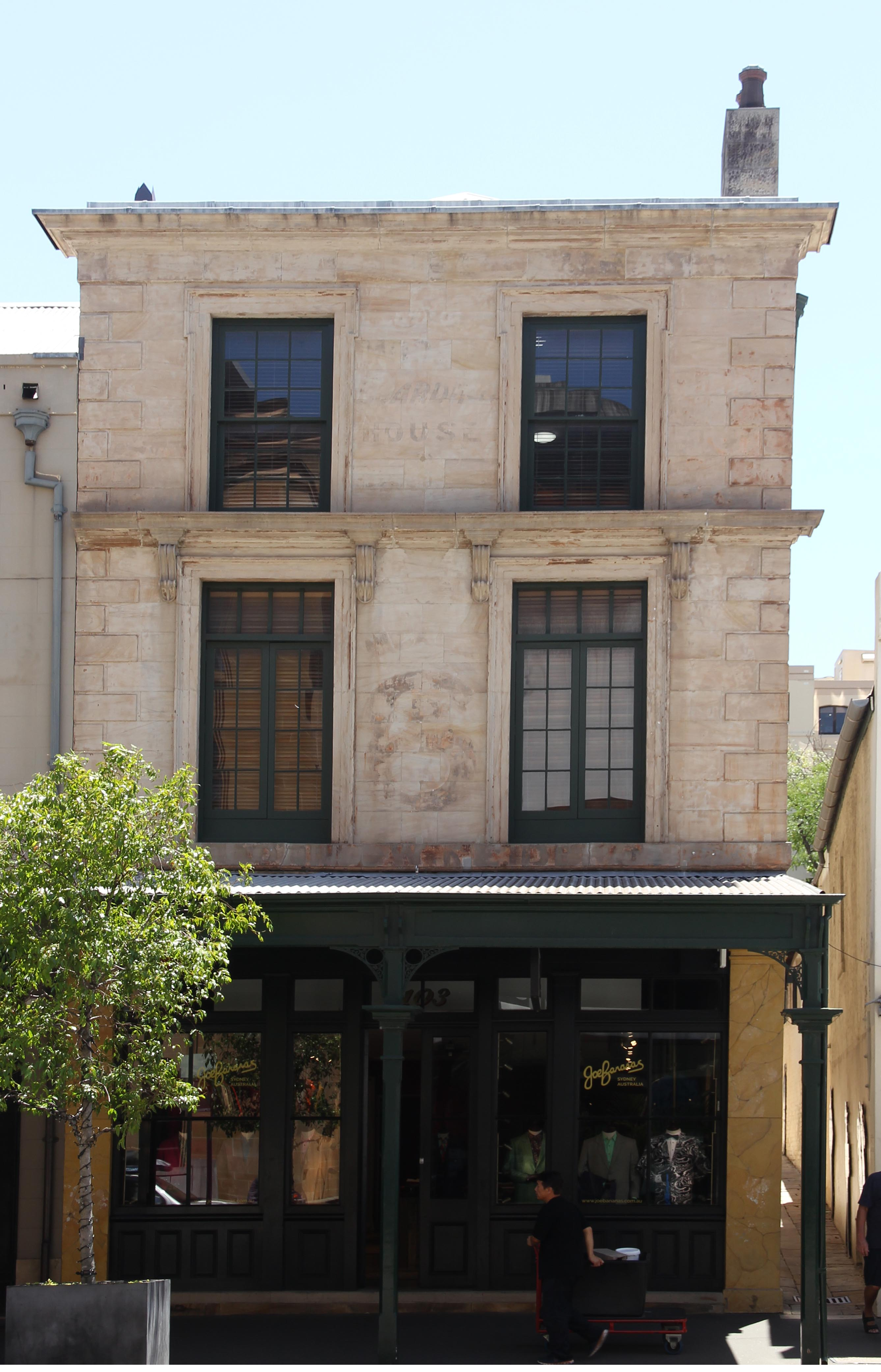
- Joe Bananas retail outlet, pictured in 2019, at 103 George Street, The Rocks

- Location within Sydney Location within Australia
- 33.8596°S 151.2085°E
- Location: 103 George Street, The Rocks, City of Sydney, New South Wales, Australia

History
- Built: 1856

Site notes
- Architectural style: Victorian Regency
- Owner: Property NSW
- Website: joebananas.com.au/pages/the-rocks

New South Wales Heritage Register
- Official name: Shop and Residence – Ariel Bookshop; Joe Bananas
- Type: State heritage (built)
- Designated: 10 May 2002
- Reference no.: 1587
- Type: Shop
- Category: Retail and Wholesale

103 George Street, The Rocks is a heritage-listed retail building and residence located 103 George Street in the inner city Sydney suburb of The Rocks in the City of Sydney local government area of New South Wales, Australia. It was built during 1856. It is also known as Joe Bananas (current) and Ariel Bookshop (former). The property is owned by Property NSW, an agency of the Government of New South Wales. It was added to the New South Wales State Heritage Register on 10 May 2002.

As of 2018 the ground-floor tenant was Joe Bananas, an Australian fashion label.

== History ==
The first building – with its associated garden – to be constructed on the western side of the cove in the vicinity of the present 103 George Street site was the hospital. Although the hospital was originally situated just north of the future Argyle St, it was moved within a year to an area just south of where Argyle Street would develop. The site, now referred to as 103 George Street, occupies part of that land occupied by the original military hospital. These early medical facilities were replaced in 1790 by a portable hospital which was brought out to the colony with the Second Fleet. On the corner of George and Argyle St, stood a building that was occupied by the Assistant Surgeon until 1814 and later, from 1814 until 1836, by Francis Greenway.

"Like so many other aspects of his life, Francis Greenway's occupancy of this house was contentious. Greenway claimed that the land had been given to him by Governor Macquarie, but no real proof could be found in government records. A document produced by Greenway may have been a forgery. He had been tempted to such a crime once before when hard pressed in his business affairs. This led to his transportation. Greenway was evicted, but was then allowed to stay on in the building, to become more and more of an embarrassment to government. Eventually he left to join his family in the Hunter Valley, where he died."

The subject site was adjacent to the residence and site to which Francis Greenway laid claim. On the site now known as 103 George St, there appears, at that time to be three structures. By the time the site was subdivided by Elizabeth Broughton (1841), only one of the buildings remained, or at least only one was shown on the subdivision plan. Elizabeth (or Eliza), or her husband William Broughton, had, prior to the official register of the grant, built a shop there between 1831 and 1832, this shop was called McHealy's China Shop. Broughton's claim to the land is noted on Robert Russell's survey map of 1834 and Elizabeth Charlotte Broughton was legally confirmed as owner of the site on 30 April 1840, by Town Grant 235.

John Richards, a draper in the Town of Sydney, purchased the property in November 1842. Maurice Reynolds (aka Morris) is recorded as the owner between 1849 and 1852. The 1851 Municipal Rate Books for Gipps ward indicated that the one-storey timber building was being used as a smiths shop. Richards sold the property to James O'Neill, who erected the three-storey structure between 1855 and 1856.

In 1871, Thomas Playfair was using the new premises at 103 George St, constructed c. 1856, as a butcher's shop. He became the legal owner in 1882. On his death in 1893, the property passed to Thomas' son, Edmund Playfair. Edmund remained the property's owner until 1902, when it was resumed by the Government of New South Wales.

Thomas Playfair joined the British Royal Navy at the age of 12 in 1845, and served on a number of ships including Hecla, Tyne, Rattler, Hecate, Asia, Swift, Brisk, and Pelorus, on which ship he travelled to Melbourne as Wardroom Steward, arriving on 30 September 1859. Here he was voluntarily discharged, and almost immediately made his way to Sydney, arriving there on SS London on 7 October 1859.

In 1860, Thomas formed a partnership with Edmund John Bailey, a carcass butcher, trading as Bailey and Co. In the same year, he married Ellen Matheson, a younger sister of Bailey's wife Margaret. In 1860, the partnership purchased the Shipping Butcher business from George Read at 107 George Street, Sydney and traded as Bailey and Playfair. After Bailey's death in 1862, it appears that his wife Margaret sold his interests in this business and the shops at South Head Road and Crown Street to Thomas Playfair. After the death of Ellen Matheson, Thomas married her half sister, Georgina, in 1867.

The property was originally leased to Thomas, but at sometime prior to 1882, he purchased it and the business remained there until the early 1900s except for a period from c. 1879, when he leased it to other interests while he rented 101 George Street, across the Suez Canal, to carry on his business until he returned to 103 in 1885.

The names Bailey and Playfair continued to be linked in the business until c. 1885. Thomas must have had great respect for Bailey, as he named his second son Edmund John Bailey Playfair.

In 1875, Thomas was elected as an Alderman for the Sydney City Council for Gipps Ward, one of the eight wards into which Sydney was divided at the time, and which included the George Street North and The Rocks area. He served continuously for 18 years until his death in 1893. He was elected Mayor of Sydney in 1885. Thomas Playfair was also responsible for the establishment of the Homebush saleyards.

After Playfair's death in 1893, his son, Edmund, continued to run the family business at least until 1907. Following this period, there was a succession of tenants using the building for a variety of retail purposes until the occupation by F. R. Edwards. Records found on the premises indicated that the Edwards family had been long term tenants, manufacturing and selling shoes and clothing. Their business was called "Edwards Bespoke Shoemakers, Late of London" at the time of establishment in 1938. The name was changed during the 1950s to "Edwards Outfitters", then, during the 1970s to "Edwards Suit, Shoe and Trouser Cave", and finally, to "Edwards Rocks Rig".

As of 2005 the tenants were Ariel Bookshop (103 George Street, and first and second levels, rear building on Harrington Street); Australian World Trading Pty Ltd., on Levels 1 and 2 above 103 George Street, and Sydney Cove Jewellery on the Ground Floor Level of the rear building fronting Harrington Street. As of 2018 the ground-floor tenant was Joe Bananas, an Australian fashion label.

Since 2022, the first and second levels have been occupied by an Australian software company called Redmap Pty Ltd. https://redmap.com/ Redmap started in 1996 and has offices in Makati (Philippines) as well as Brisbane and Melbourne.

== Description ==
No 103 George Street is a fine three storey building in the Victorian Regency style. Its proportions are pleasing with a formal symmetry in line with that of the Victorian Regency architecture in Britain which was transported to Australia and adapted by the early European settlers. It was built in 1856 of stuccoed brick with articulated quoins and finely detailed stone architraves and cornices to first and second floors. The window openings are larger than those provided in facades of similar contemporary buildings, e.g. 105 George Street. The use of decoratively moulded string courses with supporting scrolled brackets adds a touch of lightness and relief to the façade. The distinctive embellished parapet top to the front of the building is a detail that has become relatively rare. The shopfront is not original.

Style: Victorian Regency; Storeys: 3; Facade: Stone facade and boundary walls; Side Rear Walls: Rendered brickwork; Roof Cladding: Corrugated Iron; Floor Frame: Concrete.

=== Condition ===
As at 27 April 2001, Archaeology Assessment Condition: Partly disturbed. Assessment Basis: Floors level with George Street, and terraced up to level of Nurses Walk.

=== Modifications and dates ===
- 1861 – First reference to a three-storey brick building on site.
- 1865 – Additional outbuildings shown to rear of site.
- By 1880 – An extension covering half the rear yard built west of the earlier building.
- 1880 – First reference to a stone building on site.
- 1975 – Building re-roofed.
- 1978–79 – Conservation works to centre and rear sections of the building.
- 1980 – Window repairs to George Street façade.
- 1982 – Construction of front awning.
- 1984 – New shopfront to George Street.

== Heritage listing ==
As at 26 June 2002, the Ariel Bookshop and residence and site are of State heritage significance for their historical and scientific cultural values. The site and building(s) are also of State heritage significance for their contribution to The Rocks area which is of State heritage significance in its own right.

The building known as 103 George Street, The Rocks, is of cultural significance due to early associations with the first Hospital site, the early development of The Rocks precinct, the carrying out of mercantile-related businesses in the area, with cultural diversity of the various owners and tenants, and its association with a leading personality of the late 19th Century, Thomas Playfair.

The site is also significant for its close physical proximity to the home of Francis Greenway, who, for some 20 years, lived at, or near, the corner of Argyle and George Streets in the former Assistant Surgeon's residence. The site, and the historical records associated with it, provides evidence of the evolution of the Colony's system of land title registration, of the development of architectural style, and the evolution of building techniques in Sydney from the middle to the late 19th Century. It retains significant parts of its original fabric and contributes texture and form to the unique townscape of The Rocks. It provides evidence of the changing demands and expectations of the community by adaptation of the building(s) to accommodate various commercial and residential uses. It has the ability to continue as a reference to the past for both present and future generations as it can continue to be used sympathetically, possibly almost identically, to its initial form of use. The structure is substantially intact and has a high archaeological potential to reveal evidence about former inhabitants of the site.

Shop and Residence – Ariel Bookshop was listed on the New South Wales State Heritage Register on 10 May 2002 having satisfied the following criteria.

The place is important in demonstrating the course, or pattern, of cultural or natural history in New South Wales.

The building's historical significance derives from its development from the early commercial era of this city, its continual use as a retail and residential premises. The site is historically significant as a site continuously occupied by Europeans since 1788, with the First Fleet, as the site of the house of the Assistant Surgeon from c.1788 and with the first colonial architect, Francis Greenway, who lived in a house on the site between 1815 and c. 1834.

The place has a strong or special association with a person, or group of persons, of importance of cultural or natural history of New South Wales's history.

Thomas Playfair, and his family, are strongly associated with the site through his meat processing, export and butchering business. Playfair was also a Member of the NSW Legislative Assembly and Mayor of Sydney. The site itself has strong associations with Francis Greenway, who lived close by, at the corner of Argyle and George Streets, from 1814 to 1835.

The place is important in demonstrating aesthetic characteristics and/or a high degree of creative or technical achievement in New South Wales.

The building represents a commercial building typical of its type in this context. Its proportions are pleasing with a formal symmetry typical of the Victorian Regency architecture in Britain which was transported to this country and adapted by the early European settlers. The building is centrally located within the George (High) Street precinct and contributes to the heritage and townscape significance. 103 George Street and the surrounding buildings were the earliest commercial development on The Rocks area and established the urban/commercial streetscape of George Street.

The place has a strong or special association with a particular community or cultural group in New South Wales for social, cultural or spiritual reasons.

The building's social significance derives from its links with and support function associated with the development of the society in which it has sat for 150 years. Built as a store in what would have been the most important merchandising precinct in the country, its relevance grew as its use evolved to not only link its function to serve customers in general, but to more closely relate to the important servicing of the shipping industry which had developed into an essential part of the social and commercial life of the city. Its almost continuous use as a residence, as an adjunct to its retail function, derives from the early social pattern and is one of the few buildings in the area that has retained this commercial/residential tradition to the present day.

The place has potential to yield information that will contribute to an understanding of the cultural or natural history of New South Wales.

The building's scientific significance derives from the ability of its fabric to demonstrate methods of building construction contemporary with the times and the efficacy of these methods and materials to withstand a long period of wear due to usage, weathering and attack by pathological agents - mainly, in this case, termites. The builders of this period were undoubtedly schooled in Britain and skilled in methods appropriate to conditions and materials found in their homeland. The site and building have the ability to reveal evidence of pre-European culture, of its use as a garden site associated with the hospital, and of earlier construction.

The place possesses uncommon, rare or endangered aspects of the cultural or natural history of New South Wales.

In its almost continuous use as a residence, as an adjunct to its retail function, the site is a rare example of the early social patterning. It is one of the few buildings in the area that has retained this commercial / residential tradition to the present day.

The place is important in demonstrating the principal characteristics of a class of cultural or natural places/environments in New South Wales.

The buildings on the site are representative of what was at the time, the most important merchandising precinct in the country. The shop premises, and the relevance of the place, grew as its use evolved to not only link its function to serve customers in general, but to more closely relate to the servicing of the shipping industry which had developed into an essential part of the social and commercial life of the city.

== See also ==
- Australian residential architectural styles
- 101 George Street
- 105 George Street
