= Captain Tench Arcade =

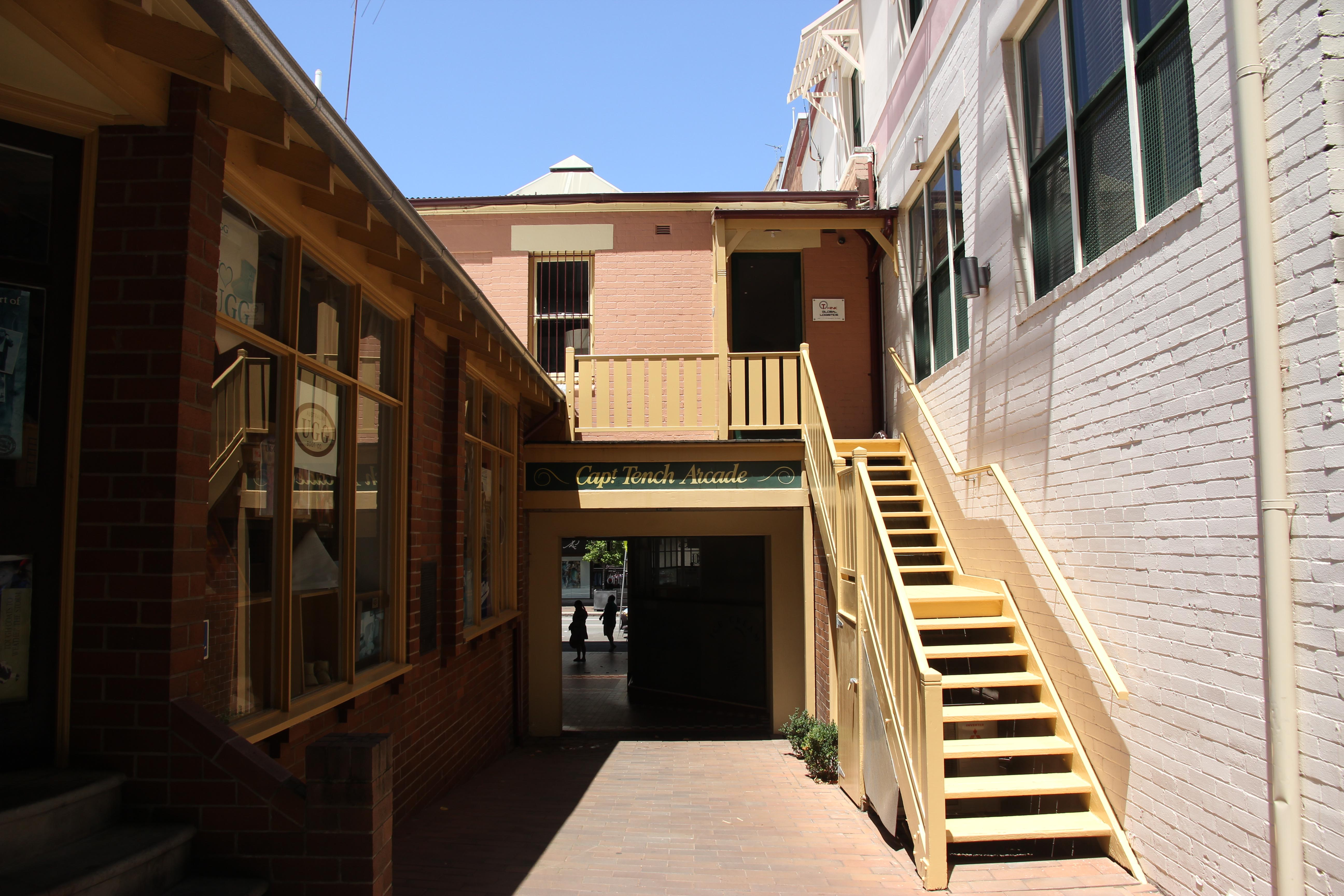
- Looking through the Arcade from The Nurses Walk towards George Street, pictured in 2019.

- Location within Sydney Location within Australia
- 33.8599°S 151.2084°E
- Location: 111–115 George Street, The Rocks, City of Sydney, New South Wales, Australia

History
- Built: 1920

Site notes
- Architect: Kell & Rigby (1985 additions to rear)
- Owner: Property NSW

New South Wales Heritage Register
- Official name: Captain Tench Arcade; Captain Tench Arcade (since 1985)
- Type: State heritage (built)
- Designated: 10 May 2002
- Reference no.: 1537
- Type: Shop
- Category: Retail and Wholesale

The Captain Tench Arcade is a heritage-listed shops, arcade and restaurant and former residence located at 111–115 George Street, in the inner city Sydney suburb of The Rocks, New South Wales, Australia. The 1985 additions to the rear were designed by Kell & Rigby. The property was built in 1920. It is also known as Captain Tench Arcade (since 1985). The property is owned by Property NSW, an agency of the Government of New South Wales. It was added to the New South Wales State Heritage Register on 10 May 2002.

== History ==
This land was part of the first hospital complex serving the early colony. The second brick ward/store was erected on this site. After the hospital moved in 1816, the land remained vacant. William Charles was granted the land in 1842 when he divided it into three lots, however he appears to have control of it from the 1830s. A brick building was initially built on the southern portion of the site in 1832 by Elizabeth Charles. Charles' land was formally subdivided in 1842 but appears to have been effectively used as three separate lots before that. These lots were developed as follows:

- Lot 111 (northern lot) vacant until 1845 when a single storey timber house was built, demolished 1861.
- Lot 113 (middle lot) vacant until 1841 when a two-storey brick house was built, demolished 1861.
- Lot 115 (southern lot) vacant until 1832 when a two-storey brick house was built, demolished 1862.

In 1862, Elizabeth Charles (William's wife) replaced the existing buildings with new three-storey brick walled slate roofed shops and dwellings on all three lots, and they continued to be tenanted by various small business uses. The Charles family retained ownership of the original grant until 1900 when it was resumed by the NSW Government under the Observatory Hill Resumption Act. During 1920 the land granted to William Charles was cleared of buildings, and by the end of that year, two new shop frontages were erected to replace the three previous ones.

Little information exists regarding the buildings located on this site between 1862 and the construction of the existing building in the 1920s. Dove's 1880 plan of the area indicates that each lot had a building of roughly similar scale, with a two-storey frontage to George Street and a single storey rear portion. Two bird's eye views show a range of two-storey buildings in this location but it is unknown as to how accurate these portrayals are. No photographs have been located which directly show this site before the construction of the present building. However, an extract from an 1879 photo of the area does show portions of the roofs of the three buildings. This photo indicates that the three buildings were narrow terrace-style buildings. All are two storeys and appear to be constructed in rendered brick. Roofs are steeply pitched and may have been slate. All buildings appear to be identical. By the 1920s, these buildings had been replaced with the current building.

The existing building at 111–115 George Street was constructed in 1920, following the demolition of three commercial buildings which had been on site since 1862. The building originally consisted of a wide, two-storey structure divided into two shopfronts on the ground floor and additional space on the first floor. It appears access to the first floor was via internal staircase(s) and may have been divided into 2 areas, as with the ground floor. The building had a timber veranda over the footpath, suspended from the first storey masonry. The northern half of the building was used throughout the 1970s and early 1980s by a restaurant known as "The Rocks Push" and "The Old Push". Photographs from the early 1980s suggest that the rear yard of the building was enclosed by a sandstone wall and used as seating for the restaurant.

In 1985 the building was extensively remodelled. This involved the reconstruction of the ground floor shopfronts to provide an arcade style passage through the building with an internal light well, as well as the removal of the original rear skillions, the construction of a new extension connected to the northern ground floor tenancy and the construction of a new external staircase at the rear to access the first floor tenancy. No plans have been located which show the building in its pre-1985 configuration.

== Description ==
Style: Art Nouveau Motifs; Storeys: Two; Facade: Brick walls; Roof Cladding: Iron; Floor Frame: Timber, Tiled Arcade floor,

=== Condition ===
As at 27 April 2001, Archaeology Assessment Condition: Partly disturbed. Assessment Basis: Modern building techniques. Underfloor deposits may remain.

=== Modifications and dates ===
In 1920 the three existing shops on the site were demolished and two new shops built with residences above. In 1985, an arcade was constructed into the frontage of this property to allow access to Nurses Walk, creating three shops, two facing George Street and one in Nurses Walk. Maximum use was made of the materials from the existing building in carrying out the work. The upper levels were used as the refurbished and renovated Rocks Push Restaurant.

== Heritage listing ==
Captain Tench Arcade and site are of State heritage significance for their historical and scientific cultural values. The site and building are also of State heritage significance for their contribution to The Rocks area which is of State Heritage significance in its own right.

Captain Tench Arcade is part of the earliest business street in Australia. It retains its 1920s façade, and though the shop front was reconfigured in 1985 to provide an arcade through to Nurses Walk, many of the original elements were reused. It is valued by the regional and tourist community as a retail focus in The Rocks and it continues the traditional retail use of the site. Captain Tench Arcade consists of well-scaled buildings which are good examples of their style and type. They provide a positive contribution to the historic George Street retail precinct in The Rocks, and the reconfiguration of the arcade in 1985 was sympathetically carried out and in no way detracts from the streetscape or the architectural feel of the original buildings. The well-designed street facades are good examples of the Federation Style with Art Nouveau Motifs. The site has significant research potential as an archaeological resource, the underfloor deposits appear to remain undisturbed from the demolition of the 1862 buildings. Evidence may still exist which has the potential to inform about previous developments on the site including the 1862 building and even structures erected or land use before this on the site.

Captain Tench Arcade was listed on the New South Wales State Heritage Register on 10 May 2002 having satisfied the following criteria.

The place is important in demonstrating the course, or pattern, of cultural or natural history in New South Wales.

Captain Tench Arcade and site are of State heritage significance for their historical and scientific cultural values. The site and building are also of State heritage significance for their contribution to The Rocks area which is of State Heritage significance in its own right. Captain Tench Arcade is part of the earliest business street in Australia and the continuing use of the buildings as shops continues this tradition. This land was part of the first hospital complex serving the early colony. The second brick ward/store was erected on this site. It has historic and social significance by the strong associations with the early grants and subsequent developments on this site and within The Rocks generally. The building provides evidence of endeavours to encourage planned development after The Rocks had been resumed by the Government in the early 20th century. This site is important as a State significant example of the 20th century use of The Rocks as a commercial precinct. The building continues the pattern of use on this site which was established in the 1830s and contributes to the surrounding commercial precinct. The construction of this building in 1920 by the NSW Government after the resumption of The Rocks and its reconstruction in 1985 are indicative of the Government's commitment to enhance The Rocks as an important commercial and recreational precinct.

The place has a strong or special association with a person, or group of persons, of importance of cultural or natural history of New South Wales's history.

This site does not meet the threshold for this criterion. While the site has been named after Captain Watkin Tench, an important figure in early colonial history, this name was not applied to the site until 1985 to commemorate his historic importance however there are no known historical associations between Tench and this site. This site has no other known historical associations with any particular individuals of note. The site is associated with the first hospital complex and gardens which stood here from 1788 to 1815.

The place is important in demonstrating aesthetic characteristics and/or a high degree of creative or technical achievement in New South Wales.

Captain Tench arcade are well-scaled buildings and good examples of their style and type. They provide a positive contribution to the historic George St retail precinct in The Rocks. The reconfiguration of the arcade in 1985 was sympathetically carried out and in no way detracts form the streetscape or the architectural feel of the original buildings. The well-designed street facades are good examples of the Federation Style with Art Nouveau Motifs.

The place has a strong or special association with a particular community or cultural group in New South Wales for social, cultural or spiritual reasons.

The Captain Tench Arcade has historic and social significance by the strong associations with early land grants and the subsequent developments on the site and in The Rocks generally. It is valued by the regional and tourist community as a retail focus in The Rocks and it continues the traditional retail use of the site.

The place has potential to yield information that will contribute to an understanding of the cultural or natural history of New South Wales.

The site has significant research potential as an archaeological resource, the underfloor deposits appear to remain undisturbed from the demolition of the 1862 buildings. Evidence may still exist which has the potential to inform about previous developments on the site including the 1862 building and even structures erected or land use before this on the site.

The place possesses uncommon, rare or endangered aspects of the cultural or natural history of New South Wales.

This building is an uncommon example of a 1920s building in a precinct which is largely 19th century in character. It meets this criterion at a local level.

The place is important in demonstrating the principal characteristics of a class of cultural or natural places/environments in New South Wales.

The place is not considered to meet this criterion as it is typical of small scale commercial buildings constructed throughout Sydney in the 1920s, however it is unusual within the context of The Rocks.

== See also ==
- Australian residential architectural styles
- Watkin Tench
- 107–109 George Street
