= 107–109 George Street, The Rocks =

Heritage-listed retail building in The Rocks, Sydney, Australia

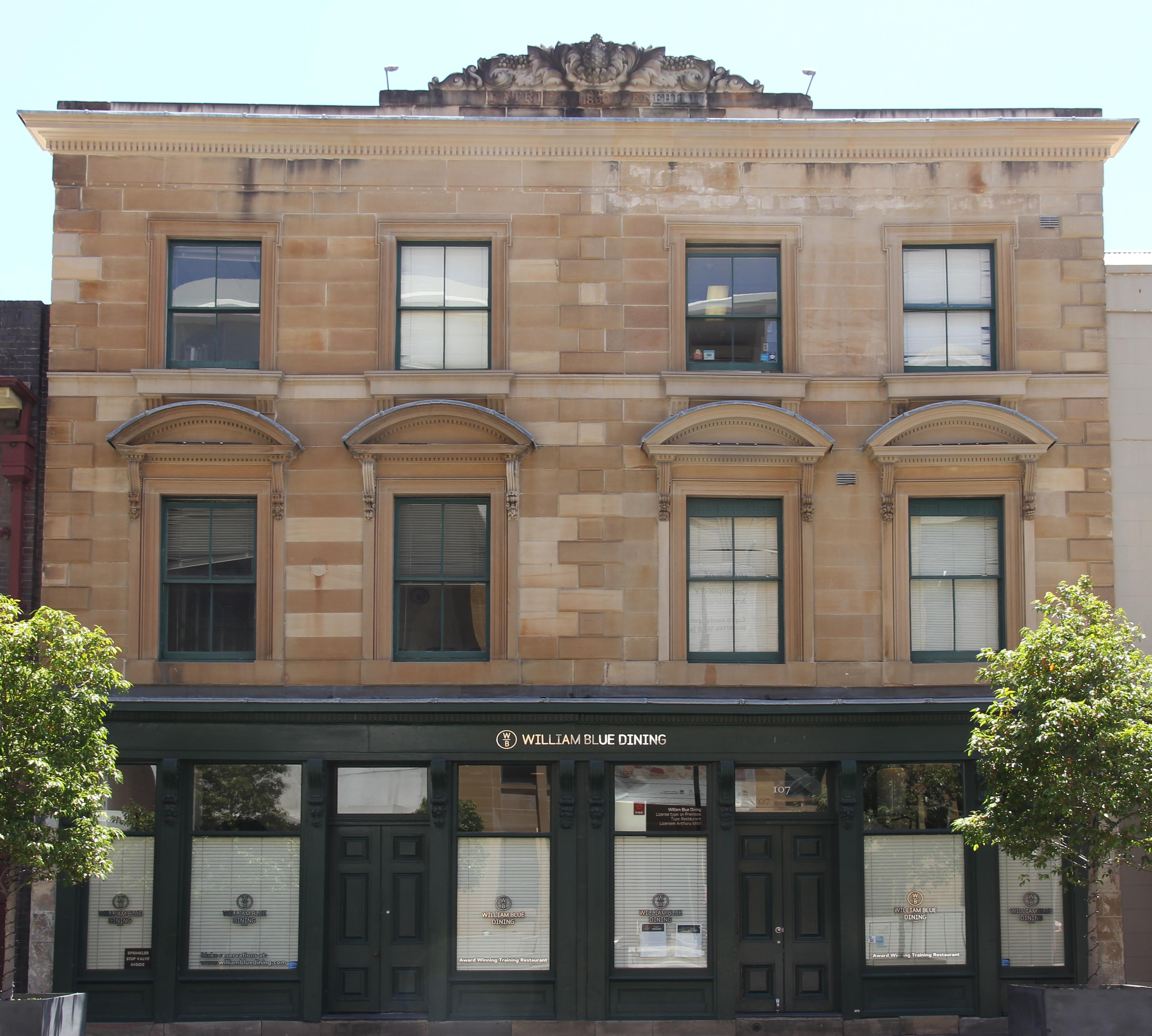
- The façade of the building, pictured in 2019.

- Location within Sydney Location within Australia
- 33.8598°S 151.2084°E
- Location: 107–109 George Street, The Rocks, City of Sydney, New South Wales, Australia

History
- Built: 1860–1860

Site notes
- Architectural style: Victorian Regency
- Owner: Property NSW

New South Wales Heritage Register
- Official name: Rockpool Restaurant (former); William Blue Dining
- Type: State heritage (built)
- Designated: 10 May 2002
- Reference no.: 1590
- Type: Shop
- Category: Retail and Wholesale

107–109 George Street, The Rocks is a heritage-listed restaurant and former retail building, residence and bakery located at 107–109 George Street, in the inner city suburb of The Rocks in the City of Sydney local government area of New South Wales, Australia. It was built during 1860. It is also known as Rockpool Restaurant (former); and William Blue Dining. The property is owned by Property NSW, an agency of the Government of New South Wales. It was added to the New South Wales State Heritage Register on 10 May 2002.

== History ==
The subject site was part of the first hospital grounds from 1788; by 1790 a new prefabricated hospital replaced the earlier tent hospital. By 1800 there were three structures in use for the hospital and it appears the subject site lay between the most northerly hospital building and the assistant surgeon's house which stood on the south-west corner of Argyle and George streets. The hospital store building may have extended over this the subject site. By 1812 some small, single-storey buildings occupied the site; these could have been the store houses for the hospital. In 1816 the new Rum Hospital opened in Macquarie Street, the original hospital on George St was demolished and the site became a government stone quarry.

The site was later granted to Mr Broughton, who appears to have given it to his wife, Elizabeth, as it is her name that is notated on later maps. The Broughtons did not build on the land until 1832 or 33 when they erected a dwelling and a shop. In November 1841 the land was subdivided and offered for sale, it was divided into four Lots, Lot 1 is the present 109 George Str, Lot 2 is 107 George Street. The plan for the auction shows that there was a shoe shop on Lot 1 and a structure marked as Mr Bradley house and shop on part of Lot 1 and along the street frontage of Lot 2. This single storey two roomed shop had wooden walls and a roof of timber shingles. Broughton sold Lot 2 (no. 107) to John Donohoe in 1842 who immediately erected a single storey wooden bakehouse timber shingled roof. It appears that Donohoe purchased both Lots as he is indicated as the owner in 1845 on the rates records, the first year they were collected.

In 1854 Patrick Freehill purchased Lot 2 in 1854 and Lot 1 in 1856. Freehill erected a bakehouse and store to the rear of his two properties during 1857. The stone store with timber shingles was three storeys and contained ovens and stables. The lower sections of walls still remain. In 1860 P. Freehill erected a four-storey (inc. basement) buildings to on both Lots. The southern half of this building was described in Sydney Municipal Rate Books of 1863 as a public house constructed of stone walls and slate roof. Freehill retained the rear store and bakehouse of Lot 1 but conveyed the public house known as "The Shipwrights Arms" to Reverend P. Young in 1868. Freehill mortgaged his property to the Bank of New South Wales in 1874 and in 1876 the "Official Insolvency Assignee Alfred Sandeman" conveyed the property to the Bank. The premises remained a hotel called "The Shipwrights Arms" until 1900 when the name changed to the "Chicago Hotel" and Margaret Riley licensee.

Nos. 107 and 109 George St were resumed by the Government in 1901, these buildings survived the demolitions that occurred around the area because of their substantial nature and relatively young age. Around 1910 the Hotel on 109 George Street became a fish shop and later a café. 107 George Street was a clothes shop between 1900 and the early 1920s, initially run by Mrs K. Symonds and then W. H. Kent and Co. After that it became a hairdresser. By the 1960s, 107 George Street contained a laundry and a museum with residential apartments in the upper levels and 109 was a restaurant known as The Rocks Push.

The building has undergone extensive remodelling during the last half of the 20th century, in 1978 the Rocks Push Restaurant expanded into 107 George Street requiring extensive renovations including the removal of the party wall between the two properties. In the same year the central section of the top floor sandstone George Street façade was reconstructed due to structural failure. In 1980 the shopfront of 107 George Street which was remodelled in the 1920s was reconstructed to match the existing original at 109 which was also restored. After 1985 the original residential entrance doors were removed from both buildings and replaced with fixed glazing and the paint was also removed from the sandstone façade.

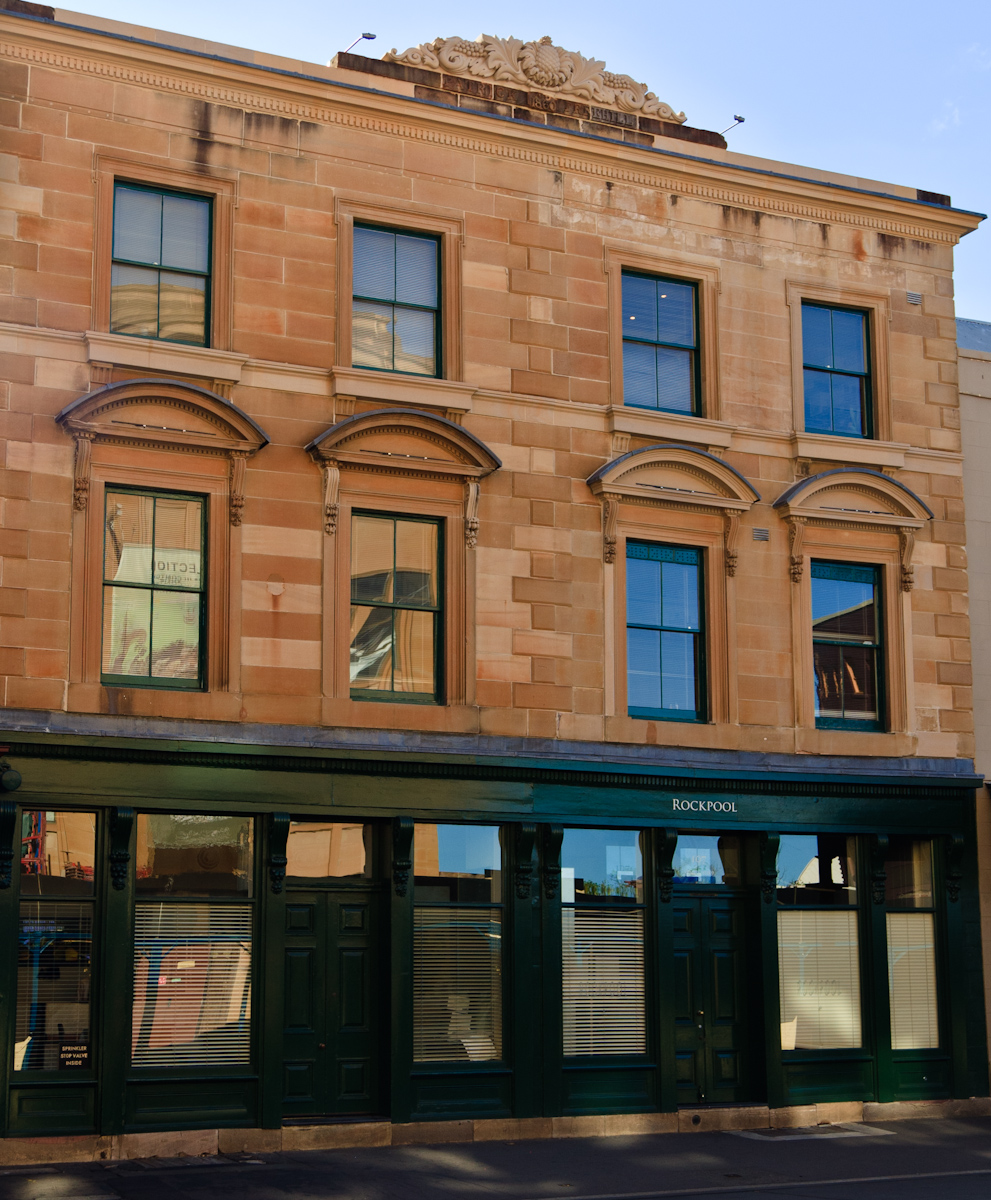
Rockpool, pictured in 2010.

The building were again extensively remodelled on the ground floor for the opening of the Rockpool restaurant by Neil Perry, Rockpool opened in February 1989. In 2009 the building underwent internal and external conservation works and a replica sandstone carved pediment was reinstated onto the roof. As of January 2019 the tenant was William Blue Dining, a 60-seat student-run restaurant that provides vocational students from the William Blue College of Hospitality Management with the opportunity to learn up-market food and beverage service skills in a live environment.

== Description ==
Construction at 107–109 George Street commenced in 1861 on the three-storey, plus basement and attic, masonry buildings. These buildings are constructed of sandstone on the George Street façade and unrendered brick at the rear. The north façade of 107 and south façade of 109 have a smooth ashlar-jointed rendered brick finish. The party wall between the two buildings is of brick construction. There is a hipped roof over each property with two rendered brick chimney stacks, each with six pots, straddling the common wall.

A single-storey section at the rear of both buildings incorporates some earlier, 1857, sandstone walls with a new rendered brickwork parapet wall above. The roof structure of this section was built as part of the 1988 interior design for the Rockpool restaurant.

In 1988 the architectural firm, D4 Design undertook the refurbishment of the ground and first floors of 107–109 George Street for Neil Perry, Chef, of the Rockpool restaurant.

Style: Renaissance Revival; Storeys: 3 + Basement; Roof Cladding: Iron; Floor Frame: Timber.

=== Condition ===
As at 27 April 2001, Archaeology Assessment Condition: Partly disturbed. Assessment Basis: Floors at or above George Street level, but below level of Nurses Walk. Potential archaeological resource.

=== Modifications and dates ===
- 1861/1857 – Construction
- 1988 – Refurbishment for restaurant
- 2009 – Internal and external conservation works including reinstatement of replica pediment sandstone carving

== Heritage listing ==
As at 31 March 2011, the Rockpool Restaurant and site are of State heritage significance for their aesthetic, historical and scientific cultural values. The site and building are also of State heritage significance for their contribution to The Rocks area which is of State Heritage significance in its own right.

The buildings at 107–109 George Street are an integral part of the fabric of The Rocks and associated with all key phases of its history, from the establishment of the colony. A particular association lies with the importance of the harbourside of Circular Quay to the commercial precinct of The Rocks in the mid 19th century. The building is a very fine representative example of commercial buildings designed in a mid-Victorian Regency style that also reflects a strong degree of confidence in this area at the time of its construction by its owner, Patrick Freehill.

The architectural design qualities of the buildings and their previous use as a combined shop and residence, for which evidence remains, provide rarity value for these buildings.

They were built in 1861 by Patrick Freehill and have had a continual commercial use since they were built. The surviving fabric has the ability to yield information on early building techniques as well as the way of life for the inhabitants. The rear section of the property incorporates the ground floor sandstone wall of a former two-storey stables/bakehouse. The buildings use since the 1970s as a restaurant continue the commercial history of the site and also reflect the growth of The Rocks area as a tourist destination. It is also as an early example of the restoration work of the Sydney Cove Redevelopment Authority. The Rockpool restaurant is a long running iconic Sydney restaurant that contributes to the character of The Rocks as an international tourist destination. The site at 107–109 George Street is a place of high archaeological research potential. Should sub-surface archaeological resources remain intact, the site is likely to yield important evidence of material culture that contributes information about the development and occupation of The Rocks area that is unavailable from other sources.

Shop, Rockpool Restaurant was listed on the New South Wales State Heritage Register on 10 May 2002 having satisfied the following criteria.

The place is important in demonstrating the course, or pattern, of cultural or natural history in New South Wales.

The buildings at 107–109 George Street have historical significance for the site is reasons:

Nos. 107-109 George Street is located on a site that was integral in the early development of the colony, being associated with the first hospital and later an early quarry. 107–109 George St is representative of the nature of development of privately built and owned commercial properties found in The Rocks in the mid-19th century as part of the development of the northern end of George St as a commercial centre associated with the maritime activity of Circular Quay. Located within The Rocks business precinct these buildings are associated with a period of growing commercial confidence in New South Wales. The building, with its fine sandstone construction and design, is a good representative example of this phase. The history of the site reflects The Rocks generally. Starting as part of the site of the Colony's first hospital, its early development reflects the first commercial developments on George St and in the Nurses Walk area before their consolidation and more intensive development in the middle part of the 19th century. The c. 1970 refurbishment of the building was one of the first undertaken by the then Sydney Cove Redevelopment Authority, a significant phase in The Rocks in the late 20th century. The combined uses of commercial premises with residences over is a typical pattern for this mid 19th century period within The Rocks. Nos. 107–109 George Street is typical of the private waterfront properties resumed by the Sydney Harbour Trust in the early 20th century. The buildings have had a continuous commercial use since they were built in 1861. They have been predominately used as a hotel and bakery in the 19th century and as a barber and restaurant throughout the 20th century.

The place has a strong or special association with a person, or group of persons, of importance of cultural or natural history of New South Wales's history.

The buildings at 107–109 George St are significant due to the following reasons:

The site is located in the historic Rocks precinct, which is associated with the convict settlement of Australia as the earliest area of Sydney to be developed. The site on which 107–109 George St is located is associated with the first hospital in Australia. The site is located on George Street, the earliest and longest operating business precinct in Australia, with 107–109 operating as a commercial premises continuously since construction in 1861. The site is associated with early activities of the Sydney Cove Redevelopment Authority and was one for the first building restored by the Authority. The site is associated with significant restaurant establishments in Sydney, The Rocks Push restaurant in the 1970s and since 1988, Rockpool under head chef Neil Perry.

The place is important in demonstrating aesthetic characteristics and/or a high degree of creative or technical achievement in New South Wales.

The buildings at 107–109 George Street have aesthetic significance for the following reasons:

The buildings display a high quality architectural design typical of the Victorian Regency style, such as its symmetrical façade, decorative sandstone parapet and restrained classical detailing. 107–109 George Street has streetscape value as being located in a row of commercial premises between Argyle and Globe Streets, in the historic Business Precinct of The Rocks, with similar scale, detailing and alignment to the street. Except for the loss of the original verandah, the street façade of the buildings has remained relatively intact since it was constructed in 1861. Although the Rockpool restaurant interior design of 1988 obscures heritage fabric and spaces it is also of some aesthetic significance as representative of post-modern design influences on interior design and architecture.

The place has a strong or special association with a particular community or cultural group in New South Wales for social, cultural or spiritual reasons.

The buildings at 107–109 George Street have social significance for the following reasons: The Rocks area is an area of Sydney that is well visited by locals and tourists. It has been the subject of many planning schemes and when threatened with demolition, articles in the press, public meetings and representations demonstrated how highly regarded this area is to the locals, people of Sydney and visitors. Much has been written on the importance of The Rocks as an example of an accumulation of urban artefacts which together present the growth of the area. The Rockpool Restaurant has become an icon of Sydney dining with Neil Perry as Head Chef over the last two decades.

The place has potential to yield information that will contribute to an understanding of the cultural or natural history of New South Wales.

The buildings at 107–109 George Street have Technical/ Research significance for the following reasons: The fabric, although modified has the ability to yield information on the configuration of early Victorian commercial residential buildings and aspects of the way of life of the people who inhabited them. The site has potential to contain subsurface archaeological deposits associated with occupation of the area from the early settlement period in The Rocks. The site may contain evidence of successive phases of use as a bakery from the mid nineteenth century. Archaeological deposits and features, particularly when considered in conjunction with documentary evidence, can provide evidence of material culture that yields information which may be unavailable from documentary sources alone. If present, remains of occupation from as early as the early 19th century on the site would comprise an archaeological resource which might contribute data that leads to a better understanding of the social, economic and cultural history of Sydney and The Rocks area in particular.

The place possesses uncommon, rare or endangered aspects of the cultural or natural history of New South Wales.

The buildings at 107–109 George Street have comparative rarity significance for the following reasons: The intact sandstone façade to George St is a very fine example of mid-Victorian Regency architecture and a rare example of this style applied to commercial buildings constructed by individual developers of this period. The buildings retain elements of a combined shop/residence, once commonly found in the business district, but now rare.

The place is important in demonstrating the principal characteristics of a class of cultural or natural places/environments in New South Wales.

The buildings at 107–109 George Street have representative comparative significance for the following reasons: 107–109 George Street is representative of the nineteenth-century urban fabric that is found at The Rocks. They are a representative example of early Victorian commercial properties built in the Victorian Regency Style. The buildings have been continuously occupied for commercial retail purposes since construction in 1861. The building's scale, detailing and alignment to the street is typical of that found along the west side of George Street and lining the harbourside as part of the Business Precinct of The Rocks. The buildings are part of the rich fabric of The Rocks which is highly regarded by residents, Sydney people and visitors and acknowledged by the Australian Heritage Commission and the National Trust as part of The Rocks Urban Conservation Area. The potential archaeological resource on the site is representative of the continuous occupation of The Rocks from early colonial settlement, through the Nineteenth and Twentieth Centuries and into the present and provides an opportunity to consider a range of questions related to change and development of the site. Archaeological evidence from the site has the potential to contribute to the evolving and layered history of this significant area of Sydney. An early example of the SCRA redevelopment projects when it was restored in c. 1970 as The Rocks Push Restaurant.

== See also ==
- Australian residential architectural styles
- 105 George Street
- Captain Tench Arcade
