= 105 George Street, The Rocks =

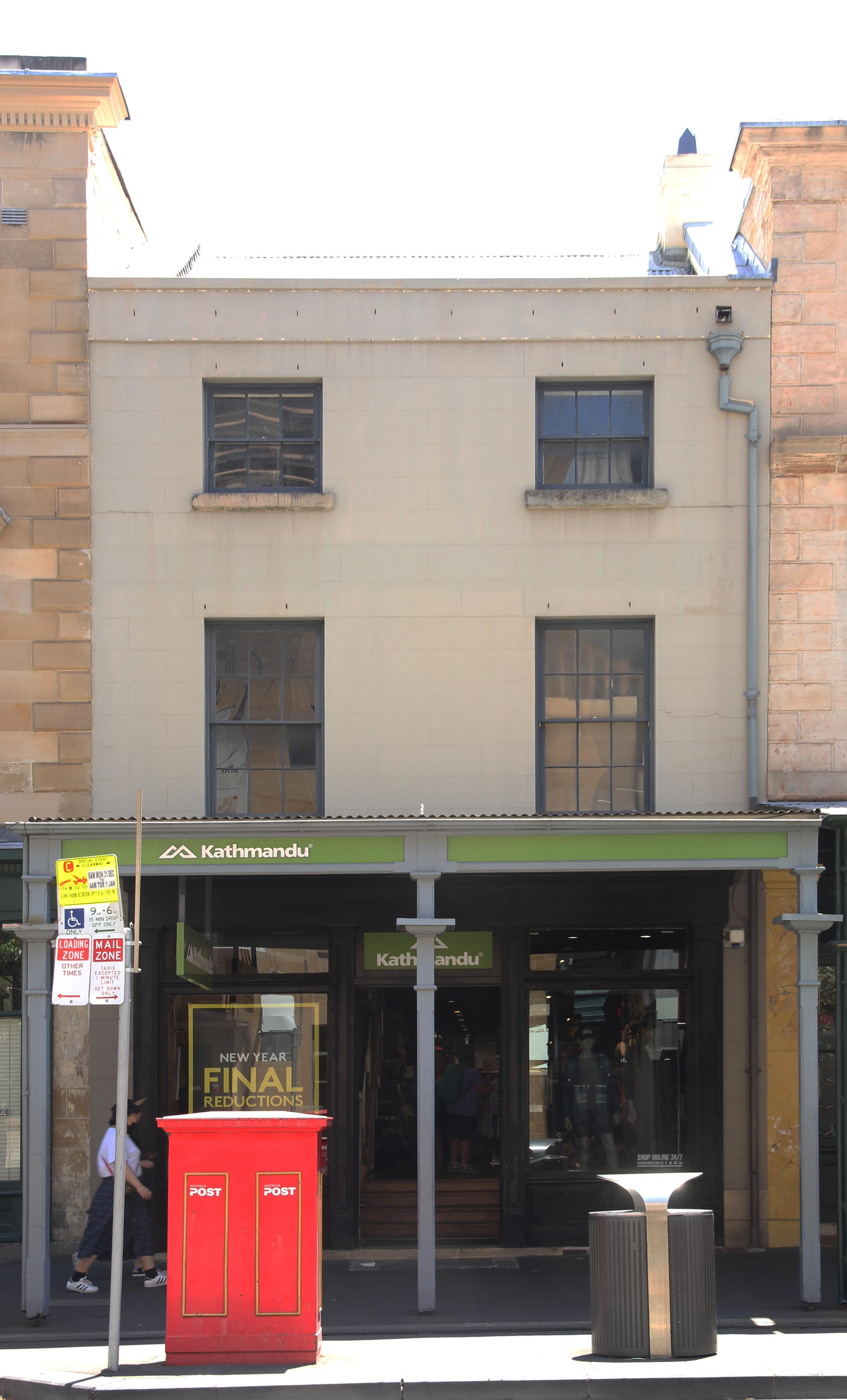
- Tenanted as a Kathmandu retail store, in 2019.

- Location within Sydney Location within Australia
- 33.8597°S 151.2084°E
- Location: 105 George Street, The Rocks, City of Sydney, New South Wales, Australia

History
- Built: 1851

Site notes
- Architectural style: Georgian
- Owner: Property NSW

New South Wales Heritage Register
- Official name: Shop and Residence; Kathmandu (current); Beach Culture (former); Dorian Scott (former)
- Type: State heritage (built)
- Designated: 10 May 2002
- Reference no.: 1582
- Type: Shop
- Category: Retail and Wholesale
- Builders: Unknown (1851); SCRA/Co-Wyn Construction (1985 addition)

105 George Street, The Rocks is a heritage-listed shop and former residence located at 105 George Street, in the inner city Sydney suburb of The Rocks in the City of Sydney local government area of New South Wales, Australia. It was built during 1851 by persons unknown and redeveloped in 1985 by the Sydney Cove Redevelopment Authority with Co-Wyn Construction. It is also known as Kathmandu (current) and Beach Culture and Dorian Scott (former). Property NSW, an agency of the Government of New South Wales. It was added to the New South Wales State Heritage Register on 10 May 2002.

== History ==
This portion of land was part of Sydney's hospital garden between 1780 and 1816. Elizabeth Broughton was registered as claimant for this allotment No. 11 in 1834 and in 1840 she was granted the property. During 1841 she subdivided the grant into four parts and advertised them for auction. The land remained vacant, serving as a passageway to Harrington Place until 1851, when Isaac Stansfield erected a shop on the site. The Municipal Council of Sydney Rate Books of 1858 listed George Thorne as the owner. The property was described as a shop and dwelling with stone and brick walls and a timber shingled roof. It was three storeys high with a basement and had six rooms.

Thomas Playfair occupied the shop from 1861 until 1869, when he moved his butchery two doors north. The shop remained vacant while G. Thorne installed a slate roof to the building and in 1870 the "American Hotel" commenced operations with John Kelly as licensee. However, during 1872 the "American Hotel" relocated to the corner of Argyle and George Streets, and the "Union Hotel" commenced operations. In 1875 the Sands Directory listed Michael Cross as the occupant, retailing dairy products. In 1879, the shop functioned as a hotel again, named the "Sydney & Newcastle", with Joseph Spora the manager. Six years later, Louis Dupont became the manager and changed the hotel's name to "Messageries des Maritimes". Joseph Emmanuel became the licensee during 1886 and remained so until 1892, when the hotel was converted into a bird and animal shop run by dealer H. Sames.

By 1896 the site was being used as a grocer's and continued in this use until 1920. It continued to be used for commercial/retail uses throughout the 1930s including by a confectioner and a dressmaker. Throughout this period of use, the upper floor appears generally to have been used as a residence, with a separate entrance, and for short periods was used as a second commercial tenancy. Commercial use continued into the 1980s, including a period of use as an architect's office from the early 1970s until the reconstruction of the site in 1985. 105 George Street was completely demolished and reconstructed in 1985 due to structural instability. Due to this, there is almost no original fabric left on site to analyse. While documentation used in the planning of the reconstruction indicates certain components from the original building façade were reused in the reconstruction, these represent minor elements of the entire building.

Archaeology notes: Part of Hospital grounds. Granted to Elizabeth Broughton, of Lachlan Vale, as trustee of the will of William Broughton on 30 April 1840. In November 1841, land was vacant with passageway across it.

== Description ==
105 George Street is an example of a simple late Georgian building of three storeys, somewhat lower than the adjacent buildings. Built in 1853, it has a timber shopfront (which appears to be original), two twelve pane windows on the first floor and two small six pane windows on the second floor. The simple projecting sills providing minimal decoration. A six panel door to one side leads to the offices upstairs.

Style: Georgian (Original) - Post Modern Victorian (1985 addition); Storeys: 3 + basement (1851) - two (1985); Facade: Brick walls; Roof Cladding: Corrugated Iron; Floor Frame: Timber.

As of January 2019 the premises housed a retail outlet of the Kathmandu chain.

=== Condition ===
As at 23 July 2001, 1984-85: Due to structural problems in the upper floors, the George Street façade was reconstructed in its 1851 configuration, using documentary and physical evidence. The original bricks were reused as were other items where possible. Reused items include first floor window joinery and stone sills on George Street façade. In 1985 the rear addition constructed.

Archaeology Assessment Condition: Partly disturbed. Assessment Basis: Floors above level of George Street, but below level of Nurses Walk. Due to structural problems in the upper floors, the George Street façade was reconstructed (1984–85) to the 1851 configuration, using documentary and physical evidence. The original bricks were reused as were other items where possible. Reused items include first floor window joinery and stone sills on George Street façade. The rear addition was also constructed at this time.

=== Modifications and dates ===
- 1984–85: Due to structural problems, the George Street façade was reconstructed in its 1851 configuration, using documentary and physical evidence. The original bricks were reused as were other items where possible. Reused items include first floor window joinery and stone sills on George Street façade.
- 1985: Rear addition constructed.
- SD 18/10/99

== Heritage listing ==
As at 31 March 2011, the shop and residence, and site, at 105 George Street, are of State heritage significance for their historical and scientific cultural values. The site and building are also of State heritage significance for their contribution to The Rocks area which is of State Heritage significance in its own right. 105 George Street is a reconstructed, typical example of a simple 19th century shop and residence. The building has been used for commercial purposes for more than 150 years. The building makes an important contribution to the surrounding 19th century commercial precinct and contributes to the character of the surrounding area of The Rocks.

105 George Street, The Rocks was listed on the New South Wales State Heritage Register on 10 May 2002 having satisfied the following criteria.

The place is important in demonstrating the course, or pattern, of cultural or natural history in New South Wales.

105 George Street is important for its part in the development of this area of The Rocks as a commercial precinct in the 19th century. This area was the commercial hub of Sydney in the mid 19th century and has continued to serve as a major commercial precinct for nearly 200 years.

The place is important in demonstrating aesthetic characteristics and/or a high degree of creative or technical achievement in New South Wales.

105 George Street is a simple but aesthetically pleasing reconstruction of a 19th-century commercial building which is generally true to its original design. The building makes an important contribution to the surrounding 19th century commercial streetscape.

The place has potential to yield information that will contribute to an understanding of the cultural or natural history of New South Wales.

As the building at 105 George Street is a reconstruction with almost no original fabric, it has little potential to provide insight into any particular aspect of the building's design or construction. The site has limited archaeological potential which may contribute to an understanding of the late 18th and early 19th century hospital uses of the surrounding precinct.

The place possesses uncommon, rare or endangered aspects of the cultural or natural history of New South Wales.

The building at 105 George Street is a reconstructed typical example of a 19th-century shop and residence. It is one of a number of similar buildings in The Rocks precinct. While it makes an important contribution to the streetscape and the precinct, the building itself does not have any unique characteristics.

The place is important in demonstrating the principal characteristics of a class of cultural or natural places/environments in New South Wales.

105 George Street is a typical example of a simple early Victorian multistorey shop and residence building that was common throughout Sydney in the 19th century. Numerous more original examples of this style of building exist throughout Sydney. As a contributory element to The Rocks precinct, it is important in demonstrating the development of The Rocks as a commercial precinct in the mid 19th century.

== See also ==
- 103 George Street
- 107–109 George Street
