= St Luke's Anglican Church, Liverpool =

Heritage-listed church in Sydney, Australia

St Luke's Anglican Church
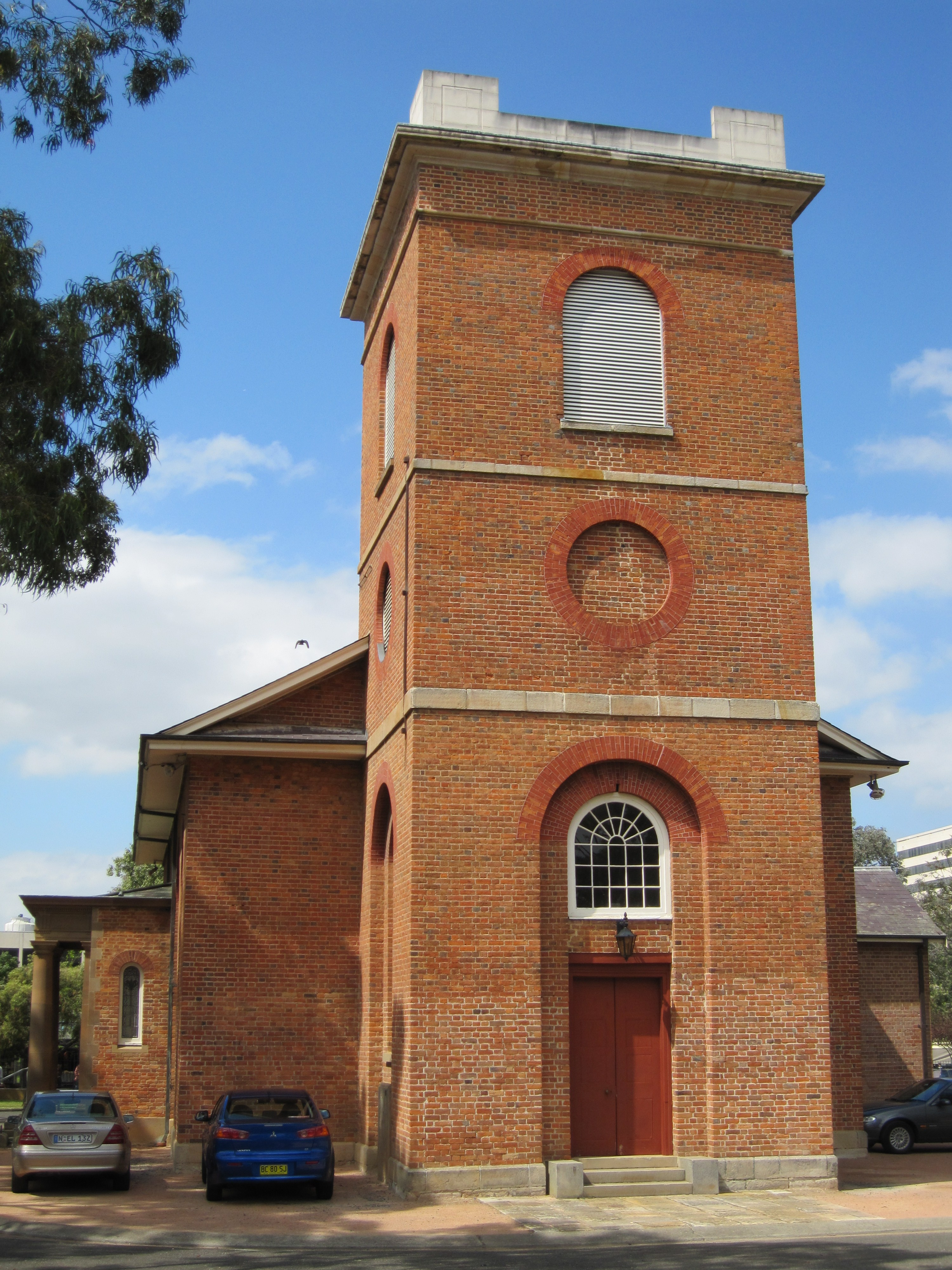
- St Luke's Church, pictured in 2009

- Location in greater metropolitan Sydney
- 33°55′15″S 150°55′24″E
- Location: Elizabeth Drive, Liverpool, Sydney, New South Wales
- Country: Australia
- Denomination: Anglican
- Website: St Lukes

History
- Status: Church
- Founder: Governor Lachlan Macquarie
- Dedication: Saint Luke
- Consecrated: 10 March 1956

Architecture
- Functional status: Active
- Architect: Francis Greenway
- Architectural type: Church
- Style: Georgian
- Years built: 1818–1820
- Completed: 18 October 1819

Administration
- Parish: Liverpool
- Building details

Design and construction
- Main contractor: Nathaniel Lucas; James Smith

New South Wales Heritage Register
- Official name: St. Luke's Anglican Church
- Type: State heritage (complex / group)
- Designated: 2 April 1999
- Reference no.: 86
- Type: Church
- Category: Religion
- Builders: James Smith

St Luke's Anglican Church is a heritage-listed Anglican church at Elizabeth Drive, Liverpool, Sydney, New South Wales, Australia. It was designed by Francis Greenway and built by Nathaniel Lucas from 1818 to 1820. The property is owned by the Anglican Parish of Liverpool and is the oldest still existing Anglican church in Australia. It was added to the New South Wales State Heritage Register on 2 April 1999.

== History ==
Commissioned by Governor Lachlan Macquarie and designed by Francis Greenway, St Luke's Church was built in 1818–1819 as part of Macquarie's establishment plan for the town of Liverpool. It was the smallest of the three major church designs commissioned by Macquarie from Greenway, the others being St James' Church in Sydney and St Matthew's Anglican Church in Windsor. A rectory was built about the same time but was replaced in 1840.

The site for Liverpool was marked out by Macquarie in 1810. St Luke's was one of the original public buildings for the town. Its foundation stone was laid in 1818. Its original builder Nathaniel Lucas died at an early stage and the job was taken over by James Smith.

The Rev. Robert Cartwright was the first Minister and the first service was held on St. Luke's Day, 18 October 1819. Governor Macquarie attended a service in December 1820. The building was not fully completed until the early 1820s. A rectory and school building, since demolished, were built close by.

The oldest extant associated building on the site is the church hall, part of which dates from the 1840s.

Rev. James Walker, described by William Woolls as "one of the most learned men who ever came to the colonies", was an Oxford MA, had been chaplain at George Town, Van Diemen's Land, before William Broughton appointed him to the new incumbency of Marsfield and the headmastership of The King's School in 1843. Walker had studied botany in Europe, but neither published, wrote, described any species, assembled any collection, or performed any task by which posterity is able to judge the quality of any botanical labour he undertook. Walker's stay in Parramatta was not long. He left in 1847 to become the rector of St. Luke's at Liverpool. It was from the Rev. Walker, Woolls said that he had "first imbibed a taste for Australian botany". As a consequence, Woolls would earn for himself a place among the distinguished Australian botanists of the 19th century.

The interior was completed in 1824. Various additions and modifications were made to the church over the years. The chancel was added in 1857, and the porch on the north side, formerly supported by four timber columns, was enclosed in 1860. The vestries were added in the 1890s. A gallery was added at an unknown date, but was later removed. Greenway's original portico on the north side was replaced by a brick porch in the 1870s but this, in turn, was replaced by a replica of the original portico in 1923.

An oversight was noticed during the Moore College 1956 centenary when it was seen that the church had not been consecrated in 1819.

The church was subject to a major restoration between 1975 and 1978.

== Description ==
St Luke's Anglican Church is a Georgian brick church with tower, portico and additional chancel and vestries, set in open grounds in the centre of Liverpool.

The clock in the tower is rare in Australia, being one of three Thwaites & Reed (UK) clocks in Australia, sent (gifted) by King George III (one in Parramatta at the Parramatta Female Factory one in Hobart).

The grounds contain some recent paving, but is otherwise mainly open and grassed, with mature lemon scented gums (Corymbia citriodora), stringybarks (Eucalyptus crebra), bloodwoods (Corymbia sp.), and a kurrajong (Brachychiton populneum).

The church was reported to be in good condition as of 8 April 1998.

== Heritage listing ==
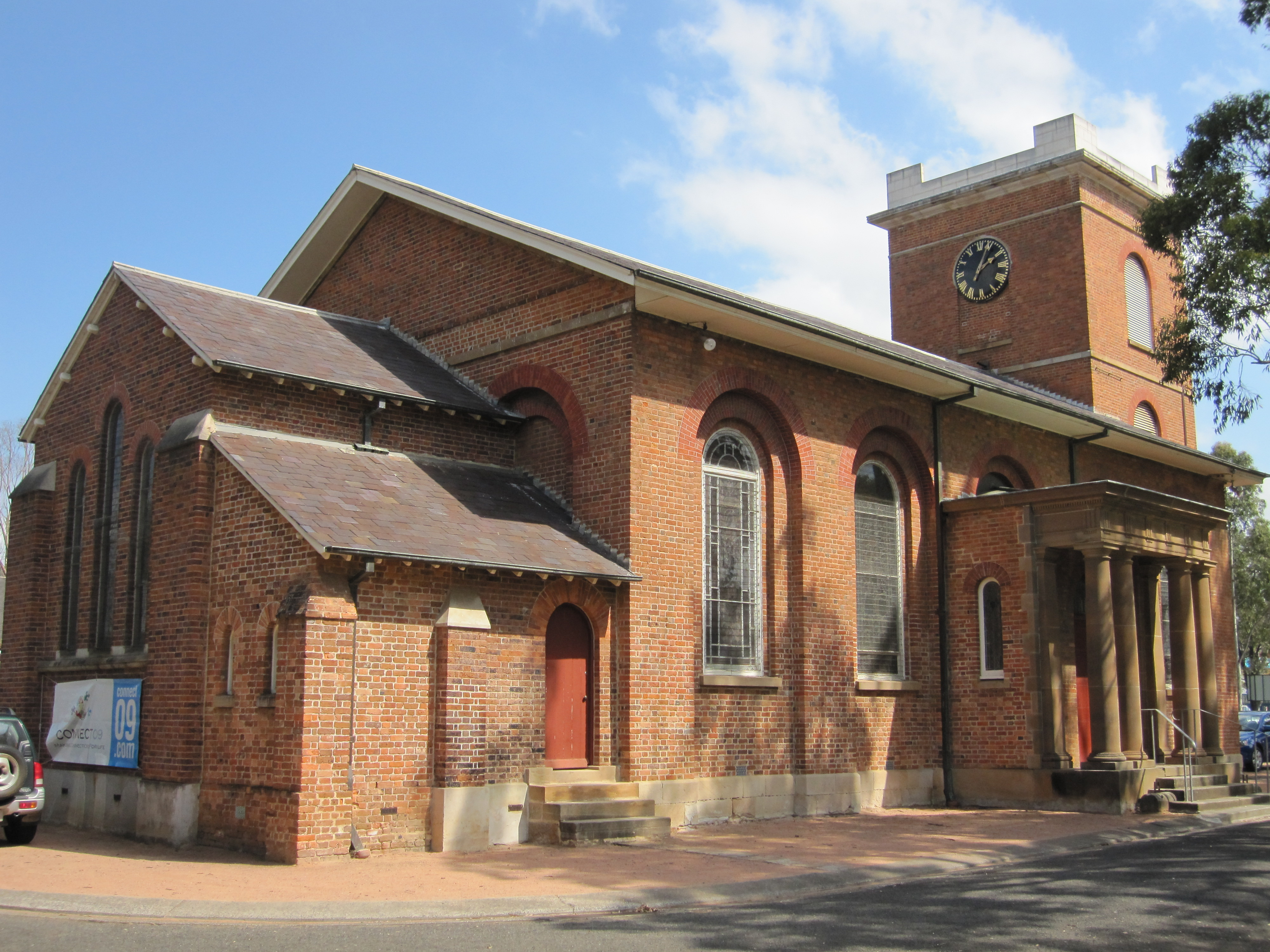
Side view of the church

St Luke's Anglican Church is evidence of Governor Macquarie's initiatives in opening up settlement in New South Wales. It is one of the three oldest surviving Anglican churches in Australia, and a fine example of Francis Greenway's public architecture in New South Wales. It is widely regarded with St James' Church, Sydney and St Matthew's Anglican Church, Windsor as a "foundation" colonial church.

The clock in the tower is a Thwaites & Reed clock, one of five sent as a gift from King George IV (the others being in the Parramatta Female Factory, St. John's Parramatta, St. Matthew's Windsor and in Hobart).

St Luke's Anglican Church Group, as part of Macquarie's original survey of Liverpool, demonstrates the history of the early settlement of the city and is a physical link to the character of the early township. It also demonstrates the history of the Anglican Church from the early establishment of the Colony from which period it has been a centre for local worship. The group is associated with many key Colonial figures, including the Architect Francis Greenway and is representative of his early colonial architectural style. Located within the heart of Liverpool the group is a historic, aesthetically pleasing landmark in an otherwise modernised city centre. It is one of only three surviving early Anglican churches in the country. There is the potential to gain more information on the site from further architectural, archaeological and documentary research.

St Luke's Anglican Church was listed on the New South Wales State Heritage Register on 2 April 1999.

== See also ==
- Australian non-residential architectural styles
- List of Anglican churches in the Diocese of Sydney
