= Francis Greenway =

British-Australian architect (1777–1837)

Francis Howard Greenway
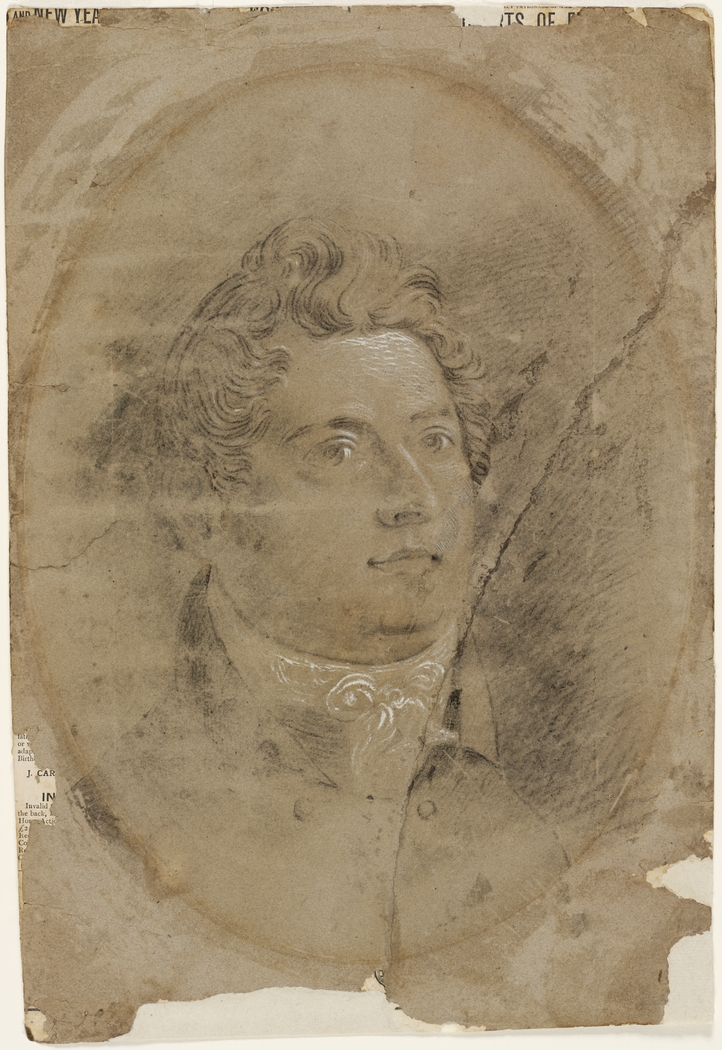
- Francis Howard Greenway, 1814-1837, unknown artist, pencil ML 482
- Born: 20 November 1777; Mangotsfield, Gloucestershire, England
- Died: September 1837 (aged 59) near Newcastle, New South Wales, Australia
- Resting place: Glebe burial ground, East Maitland, New South Wales; 32°45′33.2″S 151°34′30.6″E
- Monuments: Francis Greenway High School, Beresfield . Francis Greenway Correctional Complex, Berkshire Park NSW.
- Occupation: Architect
- Years active: 1800–1835
- Known for: Early colonial Australian architecture
- Notable work: List of works
- Criminal charge: Forgery
- Criminal penalty: 14 years transportation to Australia
- Criminal status: Discharged
- Children: 7

Francis Greenway (20 November 1777 - September 1837) was an English-Australian convict and colonial architect. After being convicted of forgery in England and subsequently transported to New South Wales, Australia (known then as New Holland) at age 37, Greenway was appointed the colony's official architect by Governor Lachlan Macquarie despite his convict status. Over the next two decades, Greenway designed the General Hospital (commonly known as the Rum Hospital), St James' Church, and the Macquarie Lighthouse. His designs incorporated neoclassical architectural principles and responded to the practical needs of the developing colony.

== Life and career ==
Greenway was born in Mangotsfield, Gloucestershire (near the English city of Bristol), the son of Francis Greenway and Ann Webb. Greenway became an architect in Bristol and Bath. His only remaining building in the United Kingdom is the Clifton Club in Bristol, originally the Clifton Hotel and Assembly Rooms, although only the front facade is his work, due to bankruptcy in 1809. In 1812 he pleaded guilty to forging a financial document. While initially sentenced to death, it was commuted to 14 years' transportation. Whilst awaiting deportation to Sydney, Greenway spent time in Newgate Prison, Bristol, where he painted scenes of prison life.

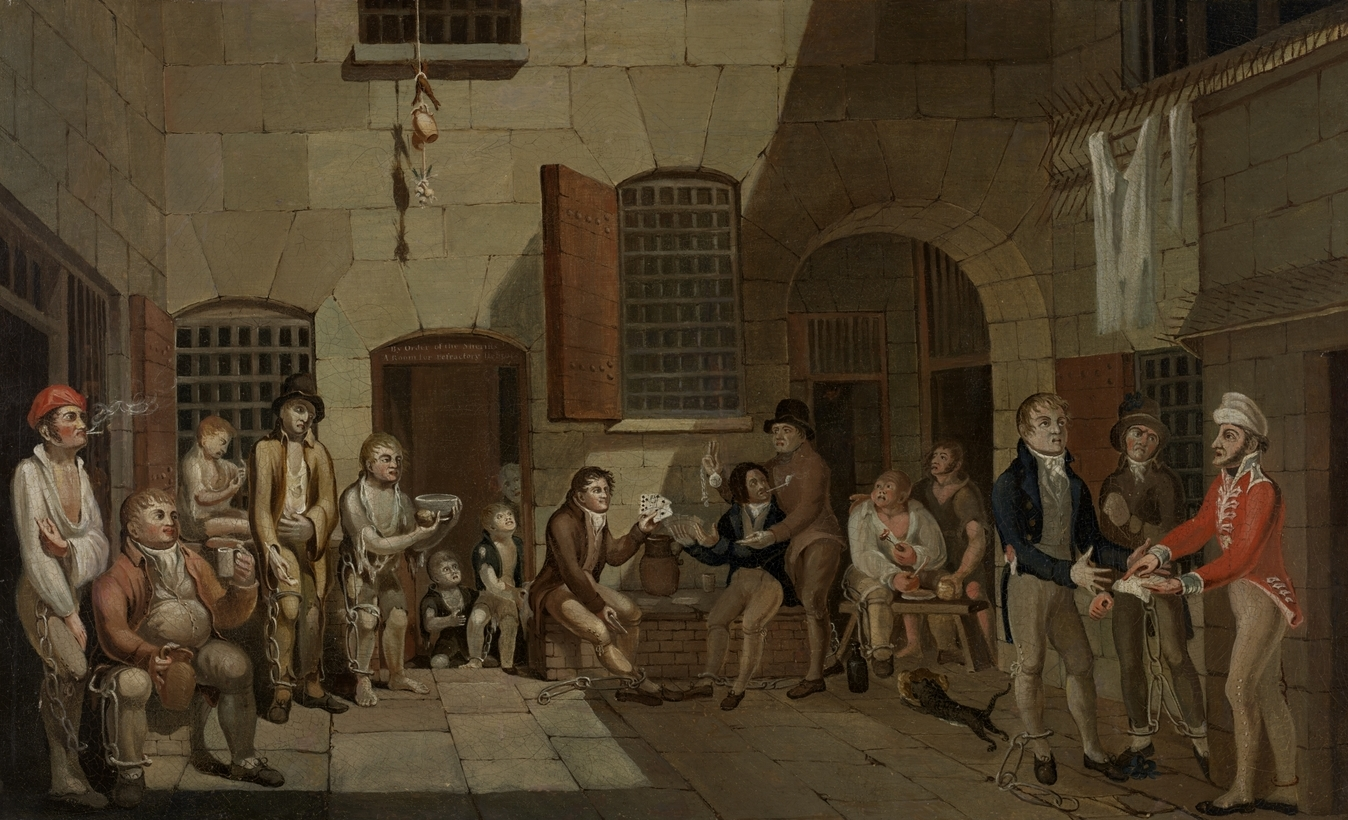
Painting by Greenway of a mock trial in Newgate Prison, Bristol, 1812, held at the State Library of New South Wales

Greenway arrived in Sydney, New South Wales, on the transport General Hewitt in February 1814 to serve his sentence. On board the ship was the surgeon Dr John Harris who was to give Greenway his first private commission in the colony which involved extending his residence on his Ultimo estate. Greenway first met Lachlan Macquarie in July 1814, to whom he had come recommended by Admiral Arthur Phillip. During the initial meeting, Macquarie sought to test Greenway by asking him to copy a design of a town hall and courthouse from a pattern book. Greenway responded with a letter asserting his professional qualifications and urging Macquarie to consider a classical design, citing Sir William Chambers. He added that he would "immediately copy the drawing Your Excellency requested me to do, notwithstanding it is rather painful to my mind as a professional man to copy a building that has no claim to classical proportion and character."

Between 1816 and 1818, while still a convict, Greenway was responsible for the design and construction of the Macquarie Lighthouse on the South Head 2 km from the entrance to Port Jackson. After the success of this project, he was emancipated by the governor Lachlan Macquarie on 16 December 1817 at the Lighthouse. In the role of Acting Civil Architect and Assistant Engineer responsible to Captain J. M. Gill, Inspector of Public Works, he went on to build many buildings in the new colony.

Greenway's works include Hyde Park Barracks, extensions to First Government House, the stables for a projected new Government House (condemned for their 'useless magnificence' by a visiting British official, the building is now home to the Sydney Conservatorium of Music), and St James' Church, Sydney, which was chosen as one of Australia's only two man-made 'treasures' by Dan Cruickshank in the BBC series Around the World in 80 Treasures. He submitted designs for the first Catholic church in Sydney, St Mary's but they did not match the ambitious scale envisaged by the priest Fr Therry, and were not proceeded with.

Greenway was dismissed by the next Governor, Thomas Brisbane, in 1822.

In 1835 he was destitute, advertising in the Sydney Gazette that "Francis Howard Greenway, arising from circumstances of a singular nature is induced again to solicit the patronage of his friends and the public".

Greenway died of typhoid near Newcastle, New South Wales in 1837, aged 59. The exact date of his death is not known. He is believed to have been buried in the Glebe burial ground at East Maitland on 25 September 1837, but his grave is unmarked.

== Posthumous tributes ==
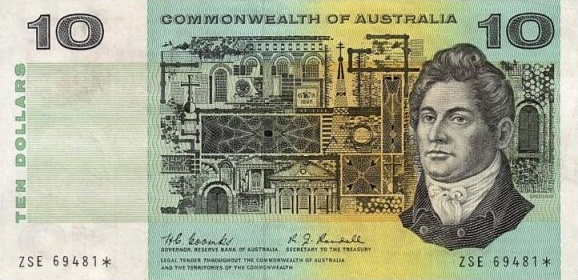
Francis Greenway on the first Australian 10-dollar note, perhaps the only convicted forger in the world depicted on a banknote.

Greenway's face was shown on the first Australian decimal-currency $10 note (1966–93).

Greenway is the eponym of a NSW Federal electorate, a suburb of Canberra, and a high school in Woodberry, a suburb of Maitland.

Francis Greenway Drive in the suburb of Cherrybrook is named in his honour, as is the Vaucluse home of the Australian architect Leslie Wilkinson (1882–1973).

A Correctional Centre complex near Windsor, NSW is called the Francis Greenway Correctional Complex.

== Selected list of works ==
The following works were either designed by Greenway or were influenced by Greenway:

Structure name	Location	Period	Architectural style	Contribution	Heritage status	Image	Notes
Cadmans Cottage	The Rocks	1815–1816		Supervised construction			
Cleveland House	Surry Hills			Contribution uncertain			
Clifton Hotel and Assembly Rooms building	Bristol	1806–1809		Supervised construction	Grade II* listed building on the National Heritage List for England		
First Government House, Sydney	Bridge Street, Sydney	1810–1820	Italianate	Extensions	National Heritage List; New South Wales State Heritage Register; (Former) Register of the National Estate		
Hobartville	Richmond			Contribution uncertain			
Hyde Park Barracks	Macquarie Street, Sydney	1818–1819		Architect	UNESCO World Heritage List; National Heritage List; New South Wales State Heritage Register; (Former) Register of the National Estate		
Judge's House	Sydney			Also attributed to W. Harper			
Liverpool Technical College (formerly Liverpool Hospital)	Liverpool						
Macquarie Lighthouse (1816–1878)	Watsons Bay	1816–1818		Architect			(Note: The Greenway lighthouse was replaced by the James Barnet lighthouse in 1878. The former lighthouse was demolished and the latter lighthouse remains in use. The image shows the two lighthouses, side by side, in the 1880s. The Green lighthouse is on the left.)
Obelisk	Macquarie Place	1818		Architect			
Old Government House	Parramatta			Timber portico only	UNESCO World Heritage List; National Heritage List; New South Wales State Heritage Register; (Former) Register of the National Estate		
St James' Church	Queen's Square; Phillip Street, Sydney	1820–1824		Architect	New South Wales State Heritage Register		
St Luke's Anglican Church	Liverpool	1818–1820		Architect	New South Wales State Heritage Register		
St Matthew's Church	Windsor	1817		Architect			
Supreme Court of New South Wales	Cnr King and Elizabeth streets, Sydney	1820–1828	Old Colonial Georgian (Greenway designs); Victorian Italianate (Barnet additions)	Architect (dismissed before completion)	New South Wales State Heritage Register		
Sydney Conservatorium of Music	Macquarie Street, Sydney			Architect	New South Wales State Heritage Register		
Windsor Court House	Windsor	1821		Architect			

== See also ==
- List of convicts transported to Australia
- History of Sydney
