= St Michael's Anglican Church, Surry Hills =

Vine Church
- Vine Church, Sydney
- St Michael's Anglican Church, Surry Hills
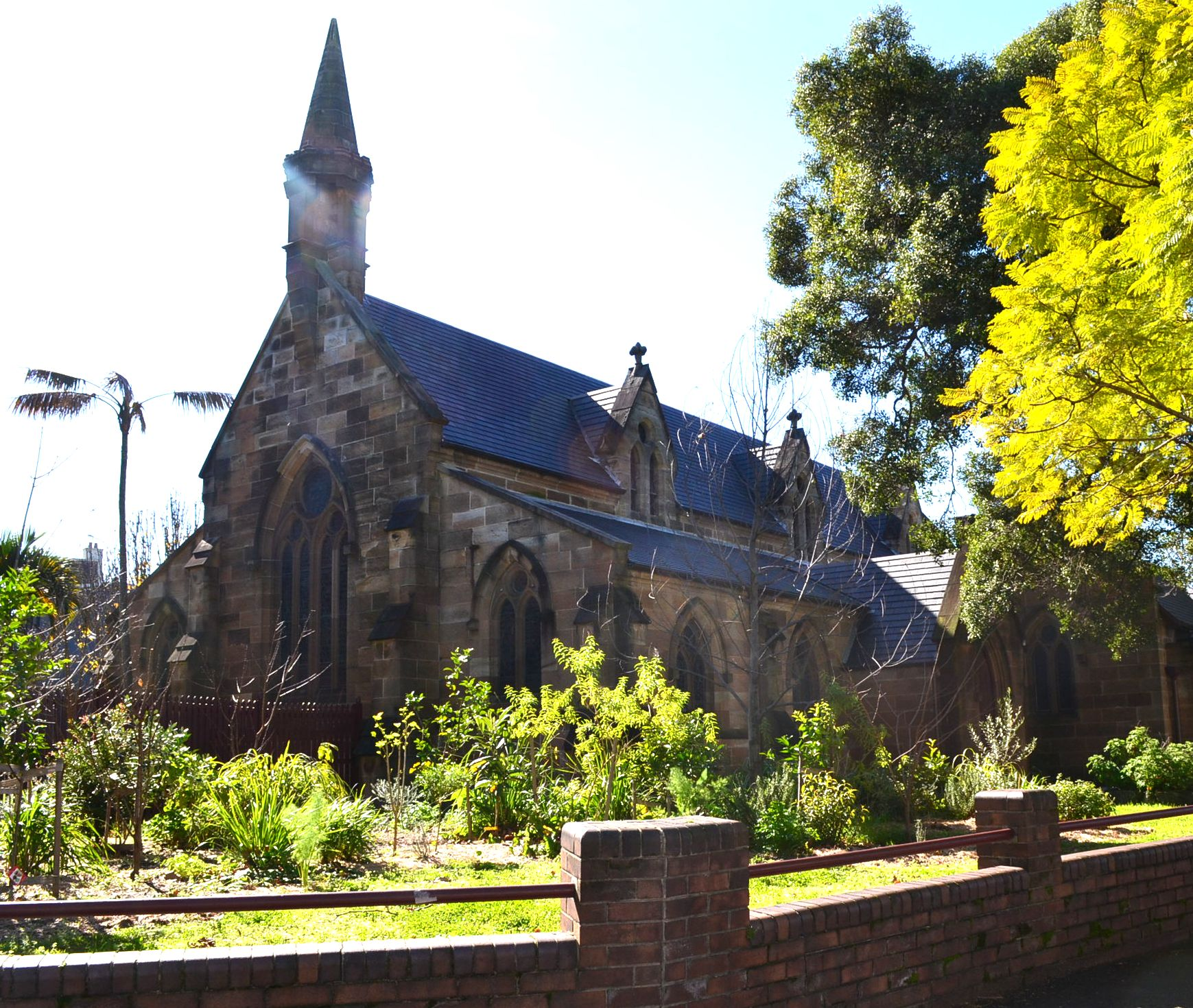

- Location in Greater Sydney
- 33°53′2″S 151°13′2″E
- Location: 81 Albion Street, Surry Hills, Sydney, New South Wales
- Country: Australia
- Denomination: Anglican Church of Australia
- Website: vinechurch.com.au

History
- Status: Church

Architecture
- Functional status: Active
- Architects: Edmund Blacket; John Burcham Clamp
- Architectural type: Gothic Revival
- Years built: 1854-1917

Specifications
- Capacity: 200
- Length: 20.5 metres (67 ft)
- Width: 12.6 metres (41 ft)

Administration
- Diocese: Sydney
- Parish: Surry Hills

Clergy
- Rector: Rev. Toby Neal

Vine Church, historically known as St Michael's Anglican Church is a church in the Sydney suburb of Surry Hills. It is located on the corner of Albion Street and Flinders Street and together with the adjoining rectory and parish hall it is listed on the Register of the National Estate. In 2015 the church merged with Vine Church, which was an Anglican church plant that had started in Surry Hills in 2011. In 2017, the church changed its name to Vine Church.

== History and description ==
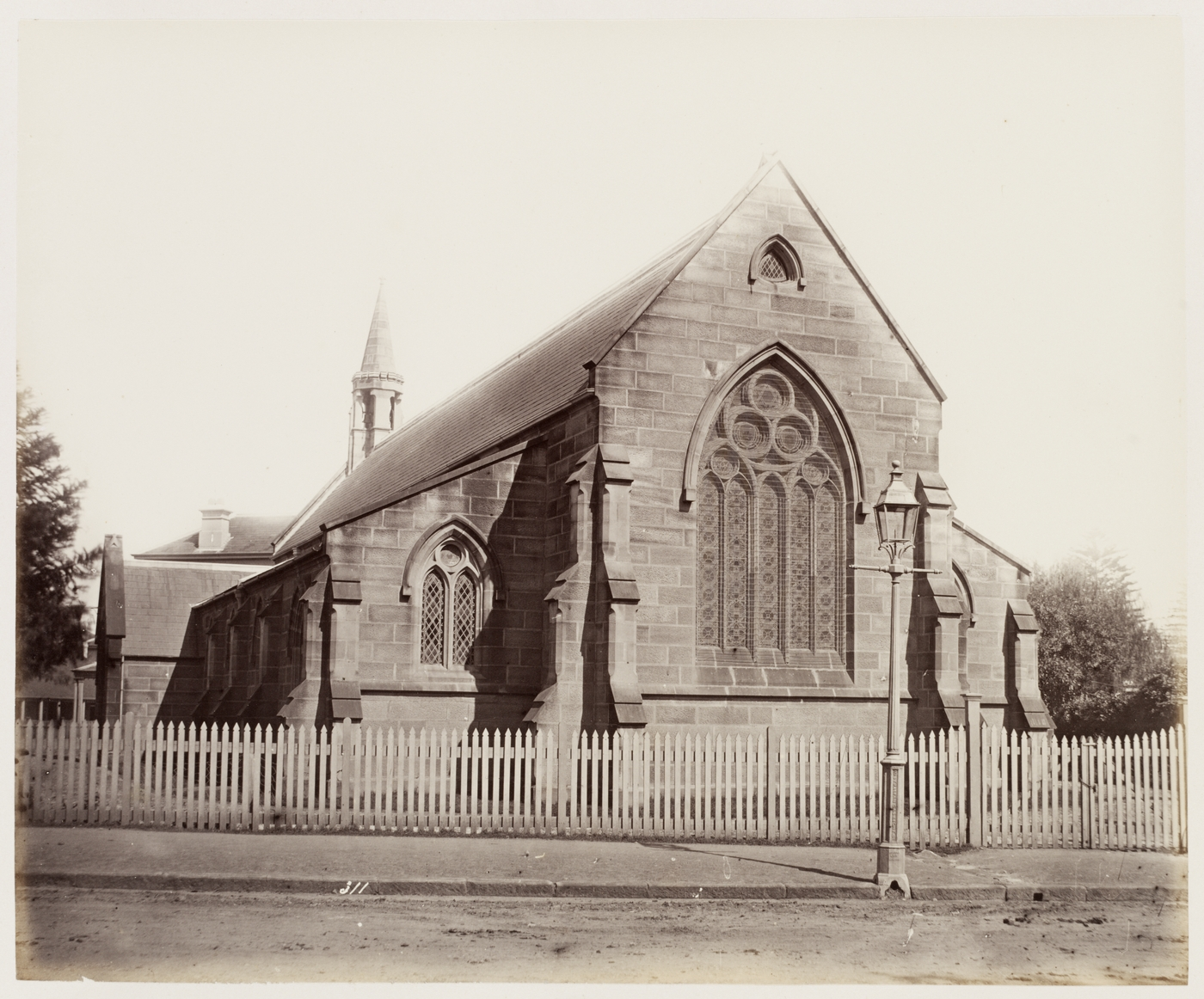
St Michael's Church, 1872

St Michael's Anglican Church was designed by Edmund Blacket in 1854 in the Gothic Revival style. Built of sandstone with a slate roof, it features a belfry, dormers (added in 1888), a fine interior of nave with side aisles, painted ceiling, and dormer lights. The chancel was rebuilt, and vestries added in 1917 by John Burcham Clamp.

The rectory, located next to the church, was also designed by John Burcham Clamp in the Edwardian style and was built in 1917. It is a two storey face brick building with slate roof, and a balustrade with wood shingles. The adjoining St Michael's parish hall is a two storey stuccoed brick with tiled roof building in an ecclesiastical Gothic style.

In 2018, the Parish Council engaged Neeson Murcutt Neille to design alterations and additions to the existing buildings on the site to meet the contemporary functional requirements of the church. Work commenced in January 2021 and completed in June 2022.

Vine Church has three Sunday services onsite.

== See also ==
- List of Anglican churches in the Diocese of Sydney
