= St Mary's Anglican Church, Waverley =

St Mary's Anglican Church
- St Mary the Virgin Anglican Church
- St Mary's Anglican Church and Pipe Organ
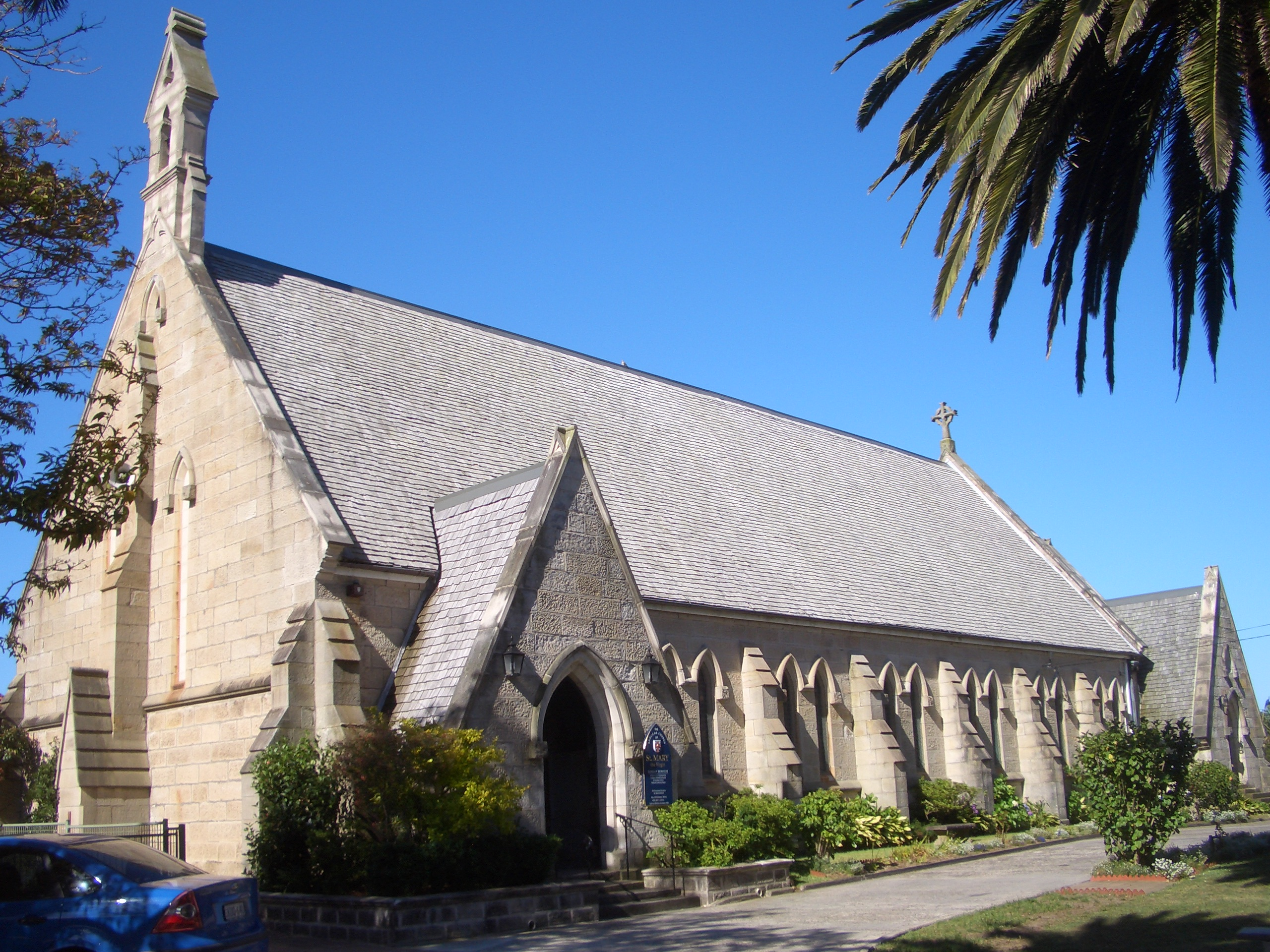
- St Mary's Anglican Church in 2007

- Location of St Mary's Waverley, in Greater Sydney
- 33°53′46″S 151°15′18″E
- Location: 240 Birrell Street, Waverley, New South Wales
- Country: Australia
- Denomination: Anglican
- Website: www.bondichurch.org

History
- Status: Church
- Founded: 6 June 1863
- Founder: Rev. Stanley Mitchell
- Dedication: Mary, Mother of Jesus
- Consecrated: 19 May 1864 by Bishop Barker

Architecture
- Functional status: Active
- Architect: Edmund Blacket
- Architectural type: Ecclesiastical Gothic Revival
- Years built: 1863–1864

Specifications
- Materials: Sydney sandstone

Administration
- Province: New South Wales
- Diocese: Sydney
- Parish: Bondi and Waverley

Clergy
- Rector: Rev. Martin Morgan
- Pastor(s): Matt Graham, Victoria Rich, Laila Rich

New South Wales Heritage Register
- Official name: St. Mary's Anglican Church and Pipe Organ; Gern Pipe Organ
- Type: State heritage (built)
- Designated: 2 April 1999
- Reference no.: 160
- Type: Church
- Category: Religion
- Builders: W. Bailey (church); August Gern (pipe organ)

New South Wales Heritage Database (Local Government Register)
- Official name: St Mary's Anglican Church; St Mary's Anglican Church & Grounds
- Type: Local government register (built)
- Designated: 6 December 1991 and 26 October 2012
- Reference no.: 2620031; 2620371
- Type: Church
- Category: Religion

Register of the National Estate
- Official name: St Mary the Virgin Anglican Church, 240 Birrell St, Bondi Junction, NSW, Australia
- Type: Defunct register
- Designated: 14 May 1991
- Reference no.: 14608
- Class: Historic

St Mary's Anglican Church is a heritage-listed Anglican church and associated facilities located at 240 Birrell Street, Waverley, New South Wales, Australia. The church was designed by Edmund Blacket and built between 1863 and 1864. It is very well known and sought after as a place to be married and is popular for funerals. The building is also notable due its pipe organ, designed and built by August Gern. The property is used for ministry by the Anglican Parish of Bondi and Waverley, which is an amalgamation of two previous Parishes (Bondi, Waverley); The first Rector of St Mary’s Waverley, Rev Stanley Mitchell, was a keen Evangelical and although he used traditional Anglican liturgy was “low church” like most of Sydney Diocese. However there has been a long history of more “High” Anglicanism and Anglo Catholic theological underpinnings. Since 2014, the church has returned to a strongly evangelical base while running a very strong traditional 1662 prayer book communion service every Sunday. It also has less traditional al services to accommodate more contemporary congregations.

This Parish is part of the Anglican Diocese of Sydney. it has another site at Bondi Beach, on Wairoa Avenue, where a number of contemporary congregations are run. The St Mary’s site was added to the New South Wales State Heritage Register on 2 April 1999.

== History ==
=== Waverley ===
Waverley the suburb's name comes from the book title by Walter Scott, famed Scottish author and poet. It was given thus by Barnett Levey (or Levy, 1798–1837) who came to Sydney in the 1820s to visit his brother. Seeing how prosperous the city was he settled and set up business in George Street as a general merchant. He was influential in bringing theatre to Australia, establishing the Theatre Royal in part of his building off George Street. In 1831 he was granted a 60-acre (24 ha) piece of land in the area of today's Waverley, bounded by Old South Head Road, Birrell Street, Hollywood Avenue and Paul Street. He built a substantial two-storey home on Old South Head Road in 1827, naming it Waverley House after the novel of that name.

In 1837 Waverley House was taken over for a Catholic school or orphanage. It was demolished in the early 20th century.

In 1857 a small stone church was built in Church Street, Waverley for the local Anglican congregation, now the site of St Clare's College, Waverley. It was soon found to be inadequate and the construction of the present building commenced with the laying of its foundation stone on 6 June 1863. It was built on a 0.4-hectare (0.99-acre) site donated by T. D. Edwards, that was part of original grant to Barnett Levey.

The building was consecrated on 19 May 1864 by Bishop Barker. The church was built by W. Bailey. The original design envisaged a tower and spire, which were never built.

Porches and the organ chamber were added in 1872. In the 1870s it was extended by 5.2 metres (17 ft) to its present size. The church was designed in the Ecclesiastical Gothic Revival style by Edmund Blacket, a prominent Australian architect of the Victorian era. The stained glass windows are some of the earliest to be made in the colony, the two in the first bay of the south wall of the nave being the earliest windows to be commissioned in New South Wales. In 1888 the pipe organ was added.

The Church is listed on the now defunct Register of the National Estate, Waverley Local Environmental Plan and the NSW State Heritage Register and extensive restoration to the fabric of the building has taken place since the 1980s. In 1993 a gallery was added and the organ relocated.

The St Mary's building is still an active base for ministry, with both traditional prayer book Anglican services and more contemporary ministries based there. It is linked to the sites on Ocean Street at Bondi (St Matthews) and on Wairoa Avenue at Bondi Beach (St Andrews).

== Description ==
=== Grounds ===
Sited on the highest point in Waverley, the group is a visually prominent feature of the streetscape, derived mainly from the stone church and wide frontage to Birrell and Council Streets. Grey sandstone wall along Birrell Street frontage (possibly c. 1925) together with mature landscape elements, Canary Island date palms, are significant visible elements. Existing plantings fronting Birrell Street provide a dense visual screen. The church and hall are set in attractive garden surrounds.

It appears little of the original landscape features remain from the Victorian period. Possibly the driveway layout is original (now asphalt). An impressive grey sandstone wall along Birrell Street frontage exists, possibly from c. 1925. There are mature Canary island date palms (Phoenix canariensis), near the adjacent former Church Hall and within the grounds. These are notable landscape elements to about 13 metres (43 ft) high, dating probably from c. 1920. Other mature plantings include Lord Howe Island palm (Howea fosteriana), low hedging of box (Buxus sp.). The central lawn is of buffalo grass. Traditional central and edge bordering flower beds punctuate the lawn.

A columbabium (c. 1970) exists on the north side of the church, screened by a mature cypress (Cupressus sp.) possibly from c. 1920. Interwoven by circulation pathways and established landscaped grounds. Generally characterised by formal manicured gardens with a number of mature plantings.

=== Built elements ===
==== Church ====
One of Edmund Blacket's earlier churches. Both modest and attractive, and essentially intact. Impressive stone church in the ecclesiastical Gothic Revival style. Long nave with chancel, vestry and two side porches. Dressed sandstone with concrete tiled roof (originally shingled). Paired lancet windows between buttresses. Stained glass with label moulds over. Good belfry above western parapet gable.

==== Hall (now St. Mary's Child Care Centre) ====
Federation Gothic style hall c. 1900s, rectangular of dark face brick construction with a hipped roof form clad in terracotta tiles, partially-concealed behind a series of rendered masonry battlements. Has a series of entry points on the southern and eastern elevations. The western elevation has a skillion lean-to awning providing cover to mechanical and electrical plant equipment. Largely intact exterior although evidence of previous alterations and additions, retains a high degree of architectural embellishment. External walls are divided into three sections: lower portion to the rendered masonry window sills is face brick, the central portion is rendered masonry with face brick lancet-shaped window openings and a face brick upper portion to ceiling level, before being finished with a series of rendered masonry battlements. Original windows and doors are typically of timber joinery.

==== Rectory ====
c. 1930s masonry construction.

=== Condition ===
As at July 2021, essentially intact. Generally in good condition, although there is a plan to refurbish the roof cladding which is degraded wooden shingles, with Welsh Slate.

=== Modifications and dates ===
It appears little of the original landscape features remain from the Victorian period. Possibly the driveway layout is original An impressive grey sandstone wall along Birrell Street frontage exists, possibly from c. 1925. There are mature Canary island palms (Phoenix canariensis), near adjacent former Church Hall and within grounds. These are notable landscape elements to about 13 metres (43 ft) high, dating probably from c. 1920.

Traditional central and edge bordering flower beds punctuate the lawn.

A columbabium (c. 1970) exists on the north side of the church, .

== Heritage listing ==
The St Mary's Anglican Church and Pipe Organ was listed on the New South Wales State Heritage Register on 2 April 1999 having satisfied the following criteria.

The place is important in demonstrating the course, or pattern, of cultural or natural history in New South Wales.

One of Edmund Blacket's earlier churches. Of considerable historical interest. One of the oldest buildings in the Waverley Council area, and notable for its association with Bishop Barker and important local families. Sited on the highest point in Waverley and set in attractive garden surrounds.

The place has a strong or special association with a person, or group of persons, of importance of cultural or natural history of New South Wales's history.

Notable for its association with Bishop Barker and important local families.

The place is important in demonstrating aesthetic characteristics and/or a high degree of creative or technical achievement in New South Wales.

Architectural and aesthetic; value for its design, siting, on the highest point in Waverley and streetscape/landscape value, set in attractive garden surrounds.

The place has a strong or special association with a particular community or cultural group in New South Wales for social, cultural or spiritual reasons.

Cultural and social values

The place possesses uncommon, rare or endangered aspects of the cultural or natural history of New South Wales.

Rarity value for its age, design and intactness.

The place is important in demonstrating the principal characteristics of a class of cultural or natural places/environments in New South Wales.

Representative example of a Gothic Revival church design by Edmund Blacket.

== See also ==
- Australian non-residential architectural styles
- List of Anglican churches in the Diocese of Sydney
