= Edmund Blacket =

Australian architect

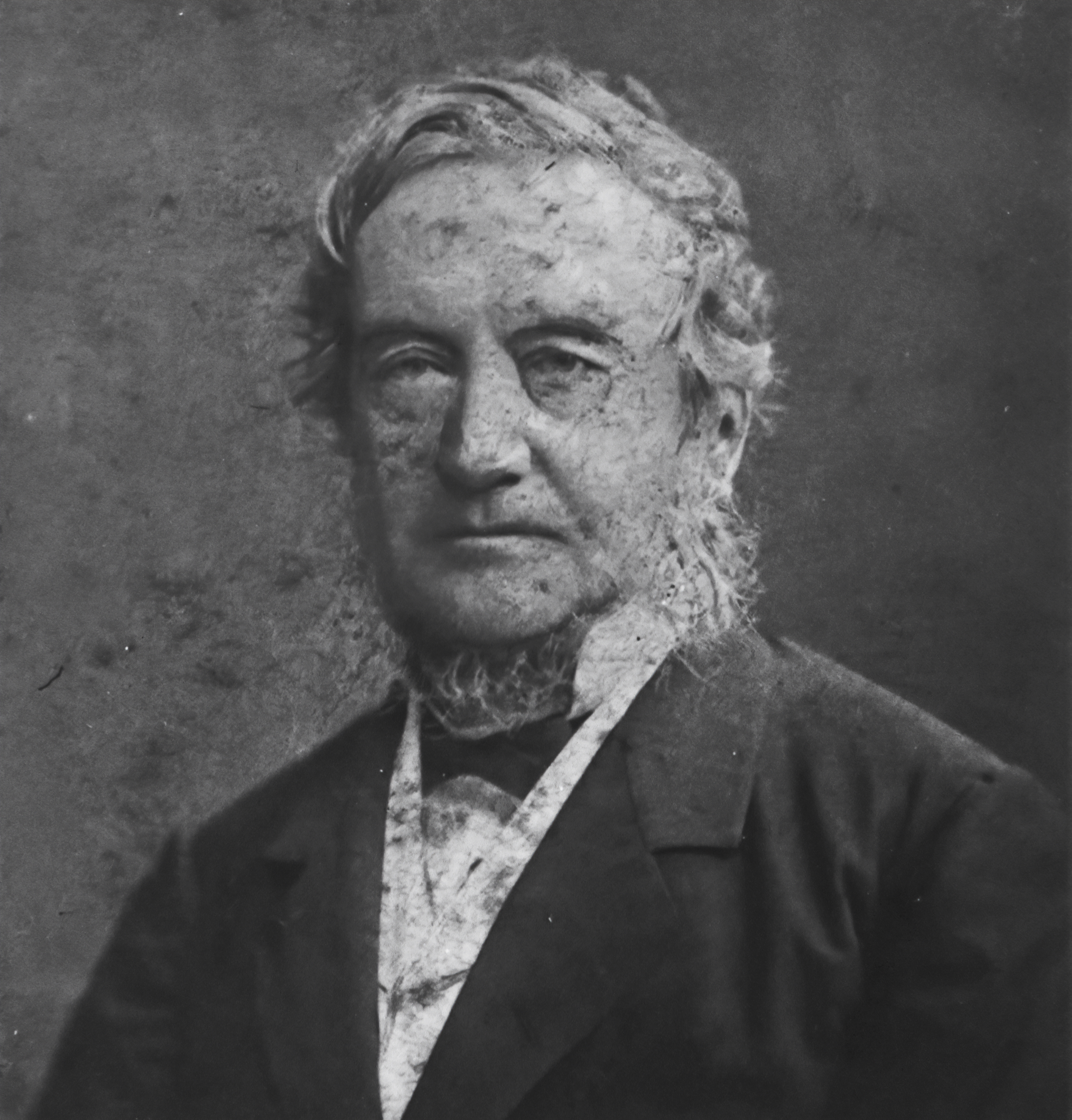
- Edmund Thomas Blacket, c. 1870
- Born: Edmund Thomas Blacket; 25 August 1817; St Margaret's Hill, Southwark, Surrey, England
- Died: 9 February 1883 (aged 65); Petersham, Sydney, Australia
- Resting place: Balmain Cemetery; subsequently relocated to St Andrew's Cathedral
- Monuments: Camperdown Cemetery
- Occupations: Architect; Colonial Architect to New South Wales
- Employers: Anglican Church; Government of New South Wales
- Notable work: University of Sydney including St Paul's College and St John's College; St. Andrew's Cathedral, Sydney; St. Saviour's Cathedral, Goulburn; Sydney Grammar School; Prince of Wales Hospital
- Style: Victorian Gothic (revival)
- Spouse: Sarah Blacket (née Mease)
- Children: 8
- Relatives: Cousins: Thomas Blacket Stephens; Christopher Wren

Edmund Thomas Blacket (25 August 1817 – 9 February 1883) was an Australian architect, best known for his designs for the University of Sydney, St. Andrew's Cathedral, Sydney and St. Saviour's Cathedral, Goulburn.

Arriving in Sydney from England in 1842, at a time when the city was rapidly expanding and new suburbs and towns were being established, Blacket was to become a pioneer of the revival styles of architecture, in particular Victorian Gothic. He was the most favoured architect of the Church of England in New South Wales for much of his career, and between late 1849 and 1854 was the official "Colonial Architect to New South Wales".

While Blacket is famous for his churches, and is sometimes referred to as "The Wren of Sydney", (Note: Blacket is Wren's third cousin seven times removed.) he also built houses, ranging from small cottages to multi-storey terraces and large mansions; government buildings; bridges; and business premises of all sorts. Blacket's architectural practice was highly influential in the development of Australian architecture. He worked with a number of other architects of both Australian and international importance: James Barnet, William Wardell and John Horbury Hunt. Among his children, Arthur, Owen and Cyril followed him into the profession. The successful architect William Kemp also trained in his practice.

Edmund Blacket is regarded by descendants of the Blackett (Note: While the family in Australia maintained the spelling of the name with a single "t", those in England adopted the more prevalent spelling with a double "t" – cf. Blackett baronets, to whom the family was distantly related.) family as "a man of the strictest probity with a great love for his profession, who also studied the classics, and was considered the leading authority on Classical Greek in Sydney, loved music, playing the organ at the temporary wooden pro-Cathedral, was a competent wood-carver and an amateur mechanical engineer".

== Early life ==
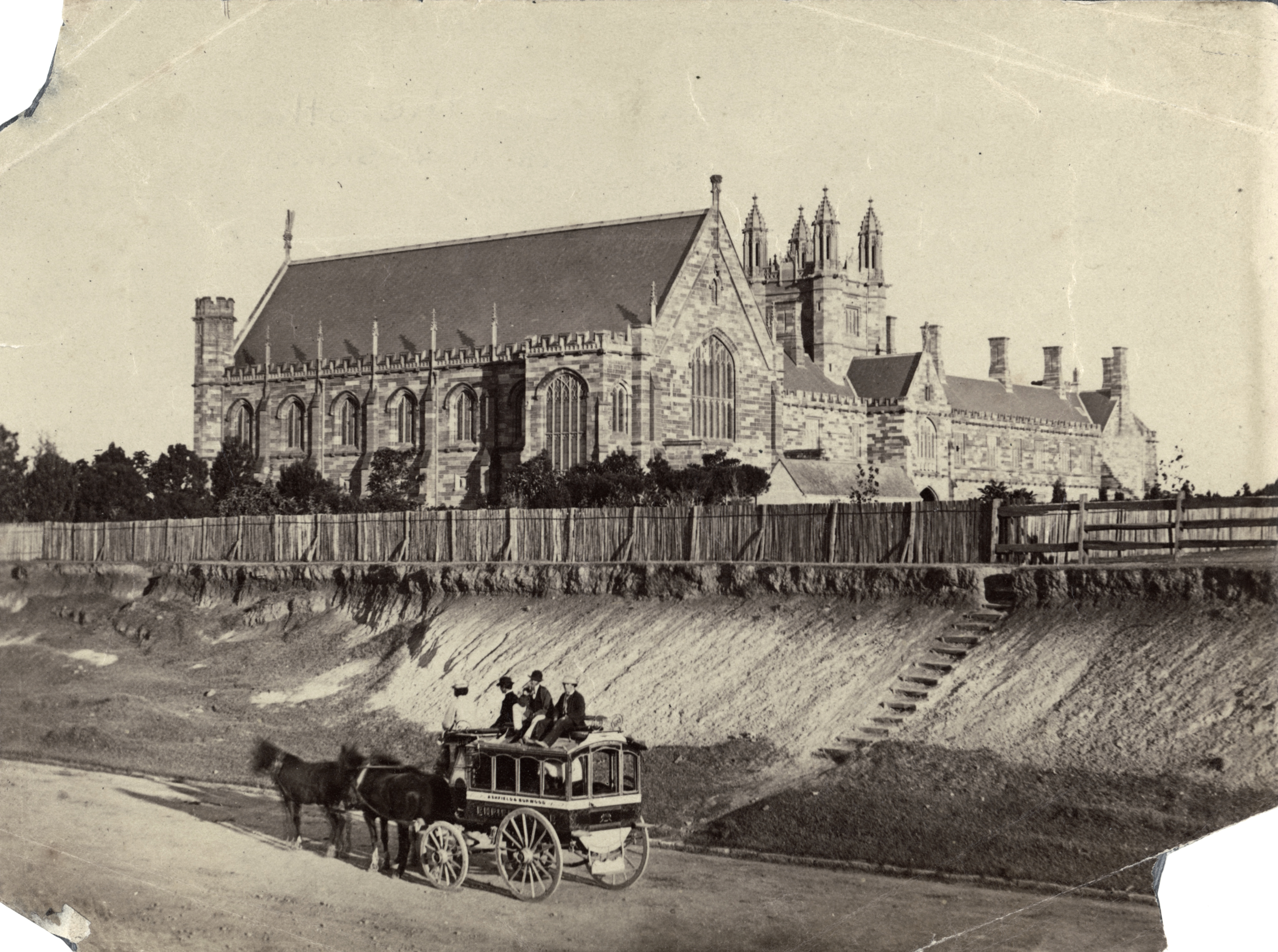
Sydney University seen from Parramatta road in the 1870s.

Edmund Blacket was born on 25 August 1817 at 85 St Margaret's Hill (later Borough High Street) Southwark, London, England, the seventh child of James Blacket and Margaret Harriot née Ralph. His father was a prosperous draper or slopseller of Smithfield, London. The family were Nonconformists, and Edmund's grandfather Edward Ralph, a former clockmaker, had been minister of a Congregational church at Maidstone. Blacket was educated at Mill Hill School, near Barnet, and although he showed an early interest in architecture, his father opposed him taking up the profession.

=== Training ===
On leaving school, Blacket went to work for his father and then at a linen mill in Stokesley, Yorkshire. This mill was owned by his father in partnership with a Thomas Mease and operated by Edmund's brothers John and James. However, the Blackets ended the partnership with Mease in July 1837 as they were unhappy about certain financial matters, and by March 1838, the issue was in Chancery.

In about 1837, although lacking formal training, Blacket began work for the Stockton and Darlington Railway as a surveyor. This was the period of rapid expansion of the railways and in railway engineering and innovation. As a railway surveyor one of Blacket's jobs would have been the design of railway stations. He continued in Yorkshire until 1841, taking every possible opportunity to draw ancient buildings and their details, which included spending his 23rd birthday surveying Whitby Abbey.

Blacket's diaries indicate that he had become a member of the Church of England and had a great love for the Anglican Liturgy. His brother Henry Blackett (Note: See Note b, above.) became a high church Anglican clergyman. Three of Blacket's sketchbooks from this period of the architectural details of buildings in the United Kingdom (1829-1841) are now held at the University of Sydney Library.

=== Marriage ===
In June 1841, Blacket was at the family home on Brixton Hill, when his father entered him on the census returns as "Draper". During the same year, he worked for the Archbishop of Canterbury in London as Inspector of Schools, and at that time learnt the craft of making stained glass (Note: Blacket's employment as Inspector of Schools may have been brought about by the influence of his uncle James William Freshfield MP.) He spent the year 'in misery', being in love with Sarah Mease, the daughter of his father's former business partner. Their marriage was opposed by the families, and having been in love probably from 1837 or earlier, they were finally wed on 27 April 1842 in the medieval parish church of Wakefield, (which later became Wakefield Cathedral) with neither set of parents present.

== Move to Sydney ==
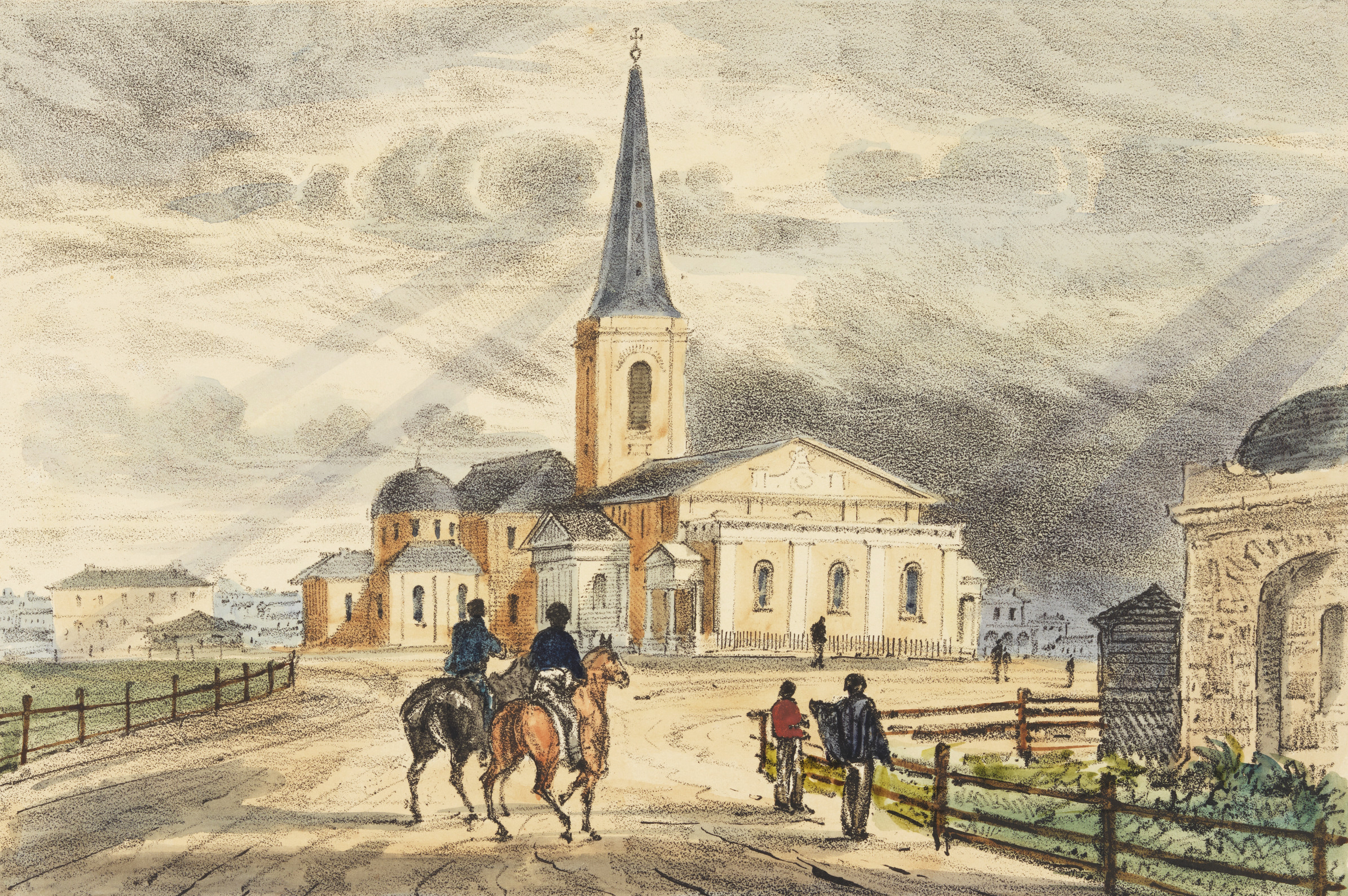
St James' Church, Supreme Court House, Sydney, 1836. Seen from the east.

On 13 June 1842, Blacket (aged 24) and his new wife left England on the passenger vessel Eden, bound for Sydney, but with New Zealand as their intended final destination. Blacket later wrote, "Neither my Father or Mother would bid me good bye, so my old Uncle offered to see us off." He had letters of introduction to prominent residents of Sydney, including Sir Charles Nicholson, Thomas Sutcliffe Mort and a recommendation to Bishop William Grant Broughton from the Archbishop of Canterbury.

Blacket suffered from sea-sickness for the first month, although Sarah did not. After about 55 days the ship called at Bahia in Brazil, where he made sketches of church doors and other items that interested him. He also acquired a marmoset monkey which disturbed his sketching for the rest of the voyage. He spent the rest of the voyage carving a wooden crucifix.

The Eden sailed into Sydney Harbour on 4 November 1842 with Blacket, who kept a shipboard diary, writing that he had never seen such "an exquisite scene". The Blackets were also greatly impressed by the crew of Māori oarsmen in the pilot boat. The first building that Blacket saw in Sydney Town was the simple copper-clad steeple of Francis Greenway's St. James' Church. He went ashore and found lodgings opposite the little Methodist Chapel with its Doric portico in Princes Street. Sarah wrote home that "almost everyone keeps a carriage" and that Sydney Town had just achieved the status of a city, the first mayor having been elected. Blacket was a prepossessing young man, handsome, well-mannered, elegantly dressed and with £600 in capital. He soon found suitable employment and the Blackets relinquished their plans to travel on to New Zealand.

=== Family relationships ===
Blacket was an enthusiastic writer, leaving a shipboard journal in the form of an ordinary school exercise book (Note: The back of the exercise book was later to hold newspaper cuttings recording the architectural successes of Edmund's oldest son, Arthur Blacket.) and sending many letters to his family in England, and to his children, particularly his youngest daughter Hilda, to whom he once sent thirty stamps, as an encouragement to write back.

In 1849 Blacket assisted his cousin Thomas Blacket Stephens in his immigration to Sydney. Thomas went on to be a prominent citizen and politician of Brisbane, Queensland. Blacket's brother Russell, who joined him in Australia in 1858, ran a school in Wollongong and was the father of Wilfred Blacket, barrister, and great-great-great-grandfather of the Australian poet David Musgrave.

All his other brothers and sisters remained in England, and their descendants include his great nephews Patrick, Lord Blackett and Basil Phillott Blackett. The breach with his parents and in-laws apparently healed. After his father's death in 1858 he wrote to his mother-in-law that "there has never been an instance in which I have failed to receive a letter from him, and in addition he has regularly directed and posted to me the Illustrated London News and Punch." The first edition of the former paper was published shortly before he left England, and would have kept him informed of architectural developments in England.

== Architectural influences and development ==
In England, towards the end the 18th century, architecture was dominated by the simple symmetrical Classical forms of Georgian architecture. This style was transported to Sydney along with the first English settlers and the accompanying military regiments. However, among England's elite there was a growing taste for the picturesque Gothic style. This too was introduced to Australia, and Sydney's convict architect, Francis Greenway, employed it in the construction of the Government Stables with battlements and towers. (Note: The Government Stables remain in use, the inner court roofed as a hall, as the Sydney Conservatorium of Music.)

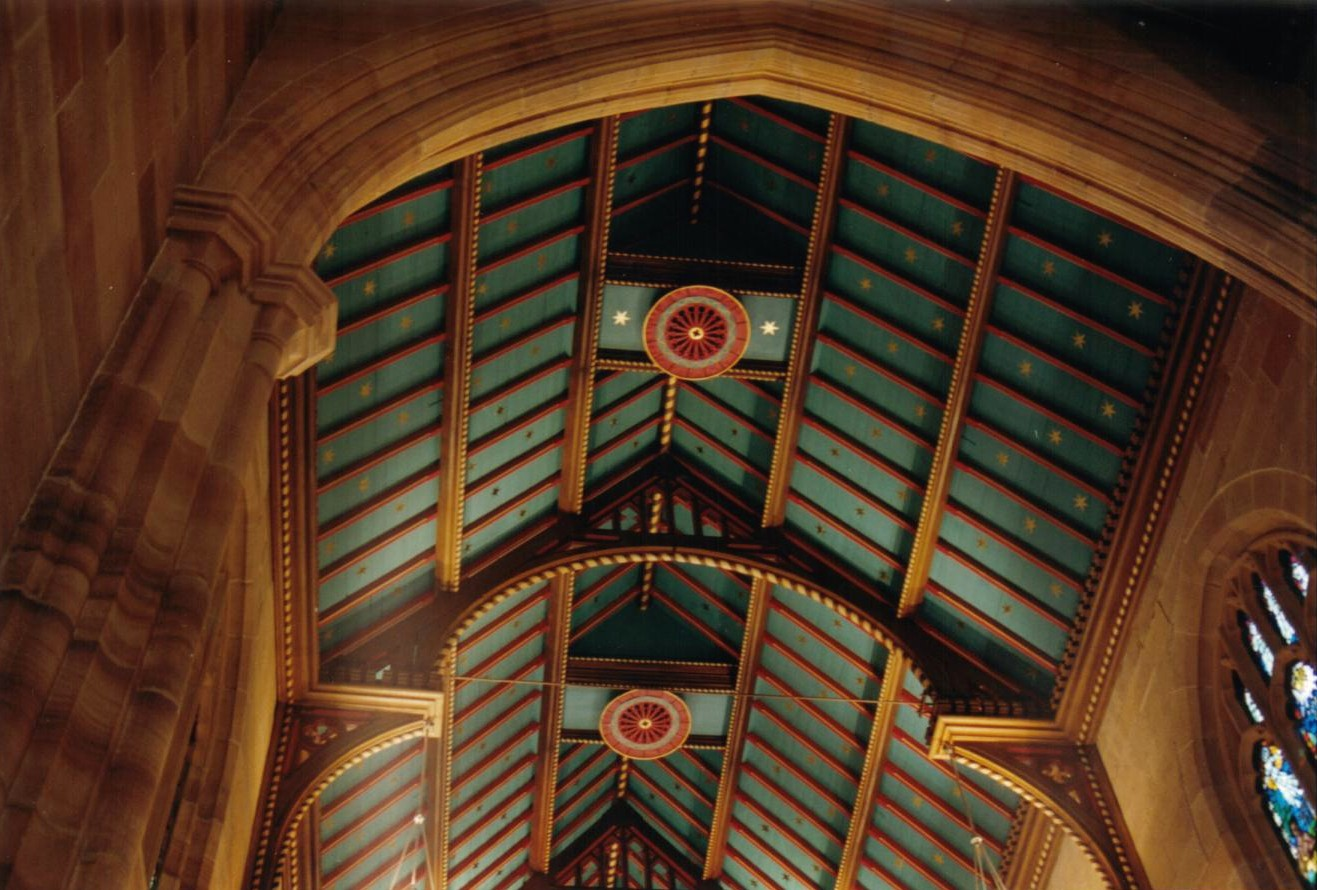
Bright colours such as those on the hammer-beam roof at St Andrew's Cathedral were advocated by Augustus Welby Pugin.

Changes within the Church of England and an academic interest in the historic styles promoted the formation of the Oxford Architectural Society and the Cambridge Camden Society which, though differing in their philosophies, both promoted the medieval styles—Gothic in particular—as being those suitable for church architecture and its correct liturgical function. The purpose of the architect was seen as being to create designs of such archaeological correctness that they reproduced the styles of ecclesiastical architecture prior to the Reformation, as is demonstrated in the work of the renowned Augustus Welby Pugin.

On his arrival in Sydney, Blacket possessed a small library of architectural books, and he kept abreast of the latest trends by subscribing to journals. Although there were a number of buildings with Gothic details in the colony at the time, in particular the existing south transept of the new cathedral, these structures had strongly Classical elements beneath their medieval detailing. Blacket was the first architect in Australia who truly understood the principles of the Gothic style and who could design a church that would satisfy the august societies of Oxford and Cambridge. Since it was the wish of so many colonials, not the least of whom was the Bishop, to assuage their homesickness by at least attending a church that reminded them of one in Cornwall, Yorkshire or East Anglia, Edmund Blacket was to become a very popular man.

Although probably at his best when designing in the Medieval ecclesiastic styles and the Florentine palazzo style which he employed for commercial premises, Blacket followed the trends of Victorian architecture in London through his subscription and library membership. Some of his later churches, particularly those in brick, were to have a robust quality, often with Early French Gothic rose windows with plate tracery or a simple quatrefoil. Blacket quickly adopted the colonial Georgian form of domestic architecture, to which he then applied a variety of details. He was also introduced to the architectural trends in both North America and Scotland by John Horbury Hunt and James Barnet respectively. From the 1870s his commercial and domestic buildings began to acquire eclectic details and incised ornament.

== "Architect and Surveyor" ==
The early 1840s were a time of economic depression in New South Wales brought on by a severe drought in 1839, so Blacket was very fortunate to immediately gain employment from Bishop Broughton as Inspector of the Schools in connection with the Church of England in the Colony. This position involved the design and supervision of the building of schools, churches and parsonages. As the colony rapidly expanded, many school buildings were designed to be multi-purpose, serving as churches on Sunday and sometimes as court houses. Blacket began work on 1 January 1843, and on 18 January delivered to the Bishop the plans for the church of All Saint's, Patrick Plains (now Singleton). He estimated that it could be built for £700. It was eventually completed in 1850 for £713.11s.6d. (Note: All Saint's, Singleton was replaced in 1910.) Other churches that he supervised, designed or extended were St John's Ashfield (1843), St Mary's Balmain (1843), St Paul's Carcoar (1845), the old St Stephen's, Newtown (1845) and Christ Church St Laurence, Sydney.

In May 1843, he put up a brass plaque on his door, advertising himself as "Architect and Surveyor" and writing to his brother Frank in London: "There is nothing to be gained here by hiding ones talent in a bushel." In the same letter he wrote of his aim to "improve the taste of the discerning public upon ecclesiastical architecture". In July of the same year, he began this by giving his first lecture, on Norman architecture, presumably at the Sydney School of Arts. Towards the end of the year, he and Sarah rented a house from Dr Hammett in Stanley Street, off College Street, where he was soon to receive an important architectural commission. Their first child, Edith, was born at Stanley Street the following year.

Christ Church St Laurence was designed by Henry Robertson in 1840. From 1843, Blacket undertook the completion of the interior and then in the 1850s he built the tower and spire. This was to become a highly significant project for Blacket. The Church of England in Sydney had been founded in 1788 by the first Anglican priest in the colony, Richard Johnson. This foundation came at a time of austerity within the Church of England, predating the Oxford Movement. The first churches in Australia, such as St James', King Street, were essentially "preaching boxes" in which the pulpit was placed centrally against one of the long walls and surrounded by tiered seating of box pews, each designated for a family. (Note: While perhaps a dozen churches remain from the Georgian period, and a few which are in a transitional style, being of Georgian form with Gothic details, only one church has retained its box pews, St. Thomas', Port Macquarie.)

Blacket was instrumental in introducing to Christ Church St Laurence all the elaborate High Church details in the style of the great Catholic architect, Augustus Welby Pugin. Sydney Evangelicals were shocked at the furnishing, the liturgy and the robed male choir, seeing it as "scandalous", and "papist". Later, Blacket was to be one of the architects to transform Greenway's St James in keeping with a High Church mode of worship (as it remains today). The Reverend WH Walsh at Christ Church St. Laurence enthusiastically helped Blacket to gain other important commissions. Blacket also had a private practice during this time, one of the most notable of his commercial commissions being the Kent Brewery for Henry Tooth. From 1843 onwards he also began receiving commissions for private houses.

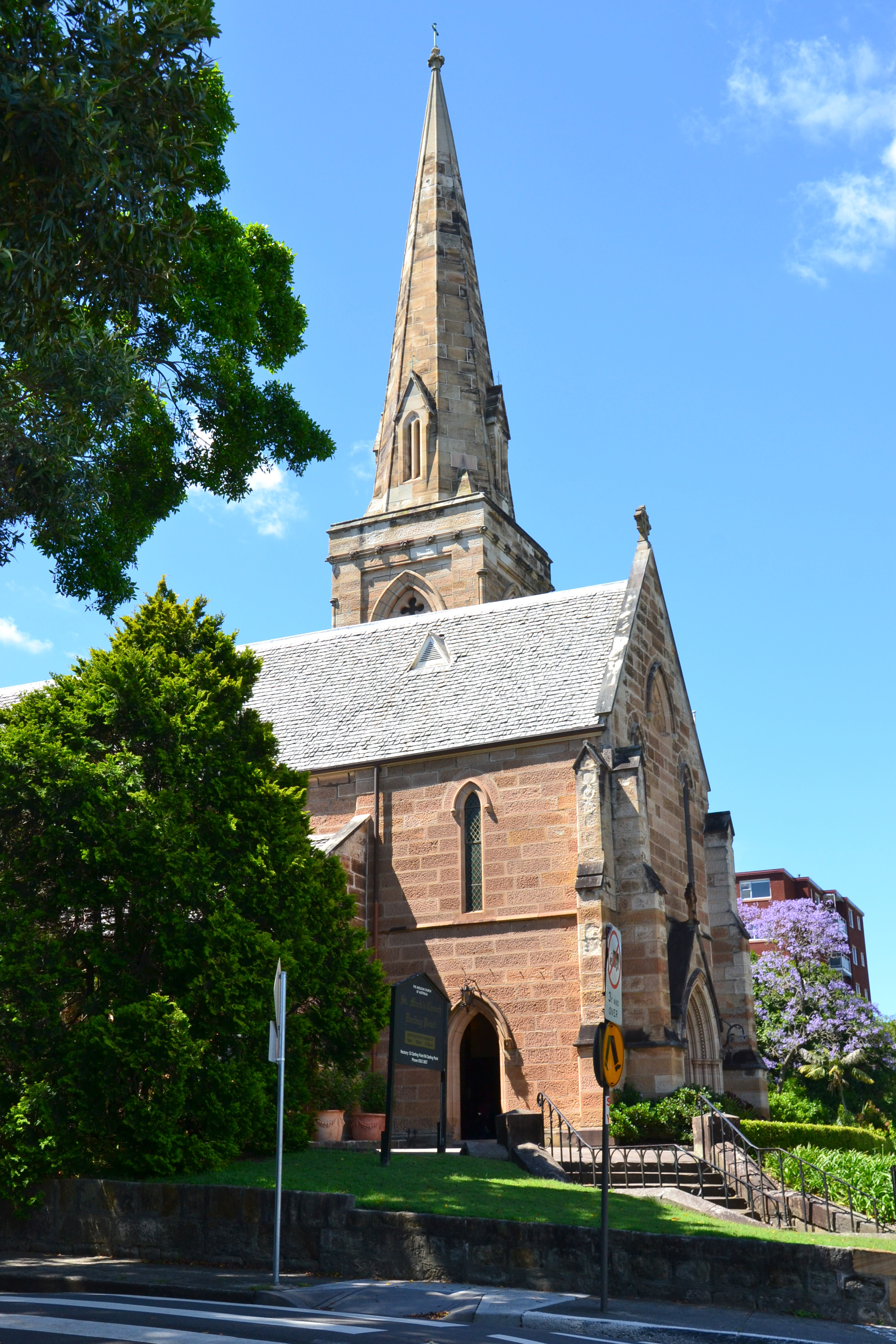
St Mark's Church, Darling Point, (1848-70) is in the Early English Gothic style.

== Diocesan Architect ==
=== St Paul's, St Mark's and St Philip's ===
In 1847 Blacket was officially appointed Diocesan Architect for the Church of England, while still continuing with his private practice. The designs of three of Blacket's most significant churches date from 1847 to 1848. These are St. Paul's, Redfern, St. Mark's, Darling Point and St. Philip's, Church Hill. As Joan Kerr points out, Blacket has used these three buildings as essays on the three main periods of English Gothic architecture: Early English, Decorated and Perpendicular, his motive being perhaps to impress Sydney with his scholarship.

Of these three buildings, St. Paul's is the most derivative of other Victorian models, the arrangement of triple aisles of almost equal height, each with an open timber roof is repeated many times in the work of Pugin and his followers. However, the window traceries, which are of the most complex of the three English styles and for which drawings still exist, display Blacket's mastery of Gothic design. (Note: St Paul's, which rises above the busy railway junction at Redfern, was sold, and has become the Cathedral of the Greek Orthodox Church in Sydney. In consequence, its internal appearance has been much changed by the addition of an iconostasis which blocks the chancel and eastern window.)

For St Mark's, Darling Point, Blacket showed the committee a design based upon an engraving of the church at Horncastle, Lincolnshire. Unlike St. Paul's, St Mark's has a high nave lit by small clerestory windows with trefoil lights above the aisles. The building work was interrupted in 1851 by the departure of men for the Australian gold rushes. The spire, which is a feature of the leafy streetscape of Darling Point Road, was chosen from 14 different versions prepared by the architect, and was paid for privately. (Note: St Mark's, Darling Point, is one of the best known of Blacket's churches, being a popular venue for society weddings, including, in 1984, that of Elton John.)

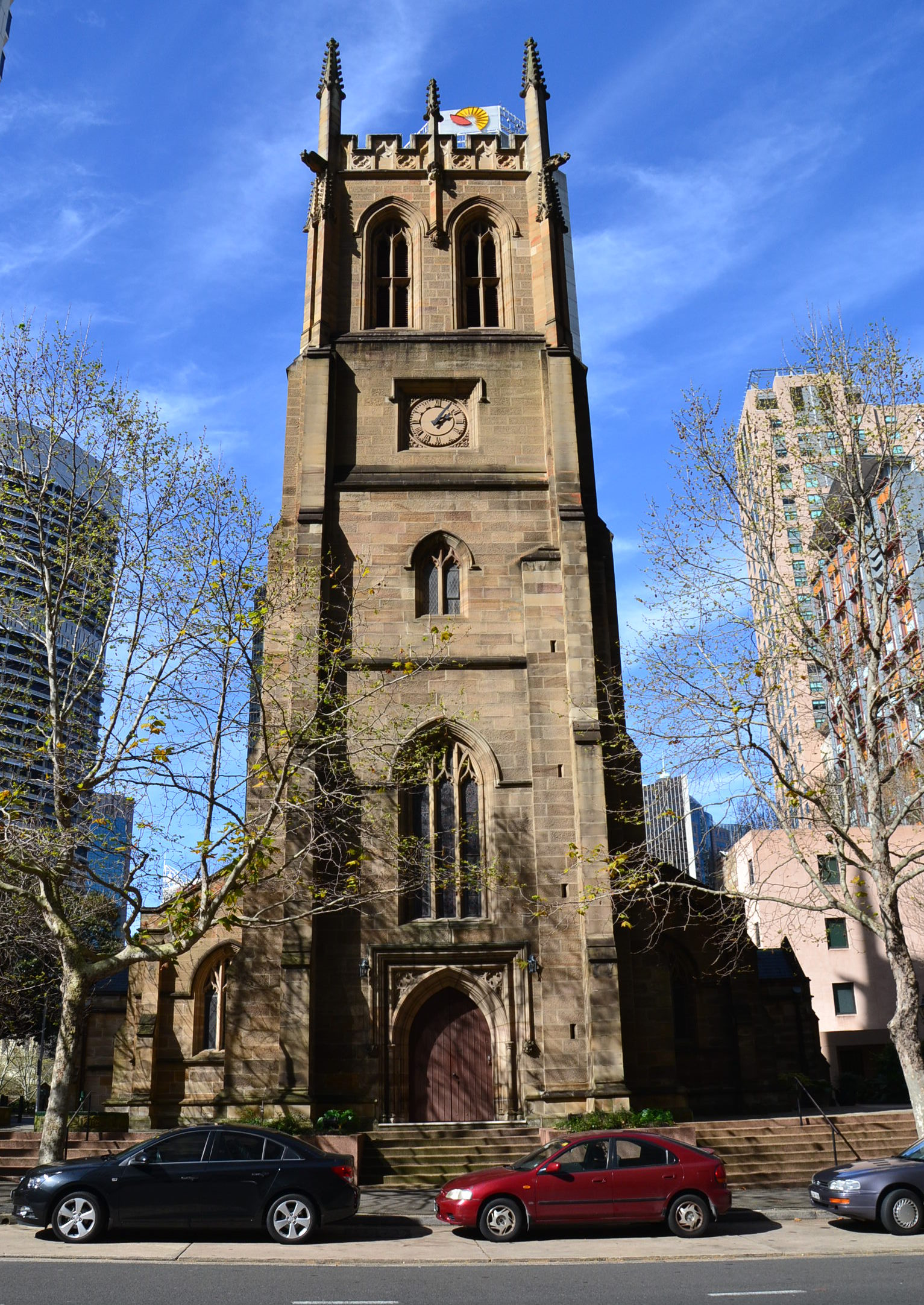
The tower of St Philip's Church, Sydney, (1848-58), was inspired by that of the Bishop's alma mater, Madgdalen College, Oxford.

At St Philip's, Church Hill, Blacket was to replace the church built by Governors Hunter and Bligh and justifiably known as "the ugliest church in Christendom". Bishop Broughton, both here and at St Paul's, wanted the design based on his beloved Magdalen Tower at Oxford. But although Blacket used the paired windows at St Philip's, the design was not a replica. Blacket was masterly at designing in the Perpendicular style and, as with other designs (such as the spire of St Mark's), he produced alternative versions which he slotted into place on the drawing or glued on as flaps, so that the Parish Council could choose. In this case they selected a design with double the usual number of windows in the clerestory level, and also two large windows in the southern side of the chancel as well as the six-light window in the eastern end, so this church, in contrast to St Paul's, Redfern, is unusually light. Unlike the Decorated Gothic tracery at St Paul's, the Perpendicular Gothic tracery is repetitious in its form. The visual effect of the church is one of harmony and elegance of proportion. Because of the Evangelical nature of this church, there is no figurative decoration, but the east window by James Powell and Sons of Whitefriars, "variegated with flowers and interspersed with texts", cost £200 and is one of the finest non-pictorial windows in Sydney.

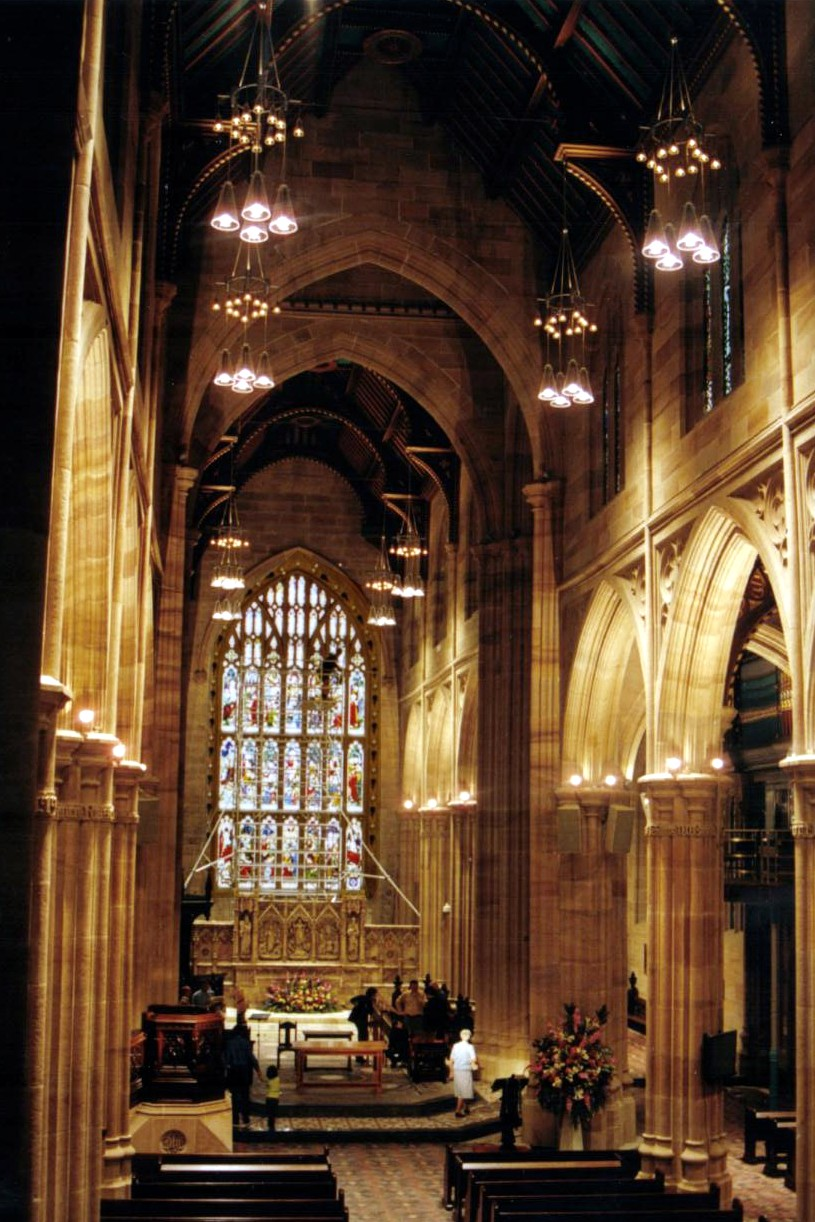
St. Andrew's Cathedral 1837–68, is a very tall building for its width, appearing a cathedral rather than a large parish church. (Note: To compare St Andrew's with England's ancient Cathedrals: The length of the building is only 48 metres (157 feet), making it shorter than Oxford (of which part was demolished making it the smallest of the ancient cathedrals), and one third the length of the iconic Salisbury (which is far from being the biggest). The width of the nave is 7.3 metres (24 feet) and the internal height of the nave is approximately 20 metres (66 feet) giving a ratio of 1:2.7. While this sort of width to height ratio is found in several of the larger Cathedrals (Ely, Norwich, Canterbury and Winchester) it is uncommon, and is hardly ever seen in ancient parish churches.)

=== St. Andrew's Cathedral ===
Blacket's association with St Andrew's, the Anglican Cathedral of Sydney, began in 1846. Grand plans for a square church had been made by Governor Lachlan Macquarie and his architect Francis Greenway, but these had been abandoned after proceeding no further than the laying of the foundation stone in 1819. By the time of Blacket's arrival, St Andrew's was under construction to a design by James Hume. It was to be a Neo Gothic structure of a relatively timid design and scale, cruciform and with narrow transepts. The foundations were laid, the south transept was almost complete, and in places the walls were 15 feet (4.6 m) high. The work had ceased through lack of funds owing to the drought. In 1846 Blacket, who was seen by the committee to have a greater grasp of architectural principles and design than Hume, was appointed to replace him as architect of the cathedral.

While the cathedral was under construction, a temporary wooden cathedral was erected, and one of Blacket's first jobs was to create a stained-glass window for it. Being unable to acquire coloured glass, he painted plain glass and fired it, using part of the crypt beneath St James, King Street, as his studio. This window, which predated commercial stained glass manufacture in Australia, has been lost. Blacket was very pleased with it and wrote to his brother Frank "the folk who come to see it ... can hardly believe it is not stained glass."

Blacket's design for the cathedral was restricted by the foundations that were already in place and the existence of Perpendicular tracery built to Hume's design in two of the aisle windows. The challenge to Blacket was to create a building which worked within the limitations of scale but still had the imposing quality of a cathedral. Once again, Bishop Broughton's aim was to have a replica of the Magdalen College tower, but Bishop Selwyn of New Zealand had laid the foundation stone in 1842, and his recommendation had been for two towers. Blacket initially designed towers that accommodated the wishes of both Bishops, but he also wrote to a relative in Yorkshire asking them to send drawings of the façade of York Minster.

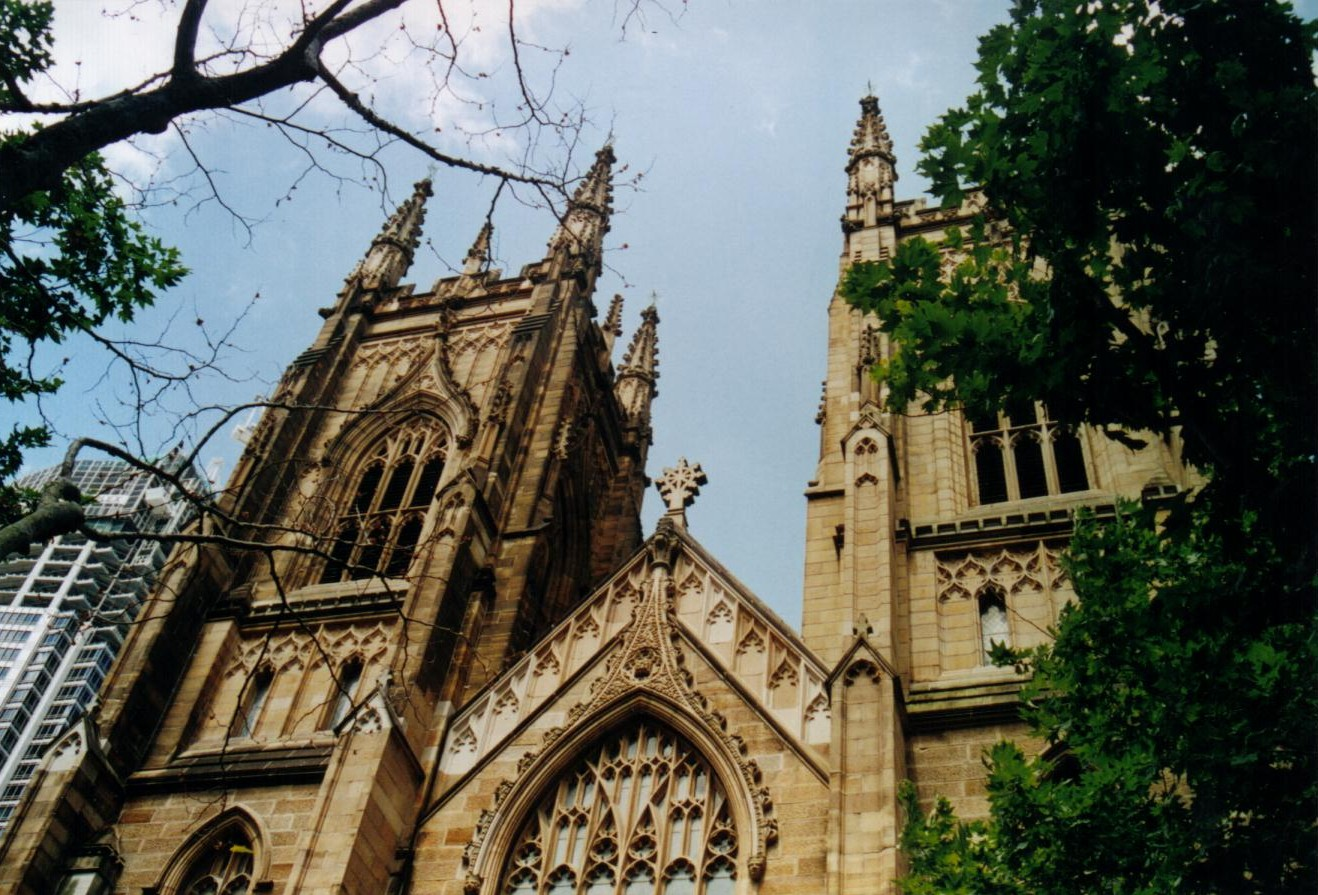
The towers of St. Andrew's Cathedral have been inspired by those of York Minster.

By 1847, all of Blacket's proposed changes, including the elaborate façade and lengthening of the nave had been accepted. (Note: The nave was extended by only two bays, not the three proposed by Blacket.) In order to make sure that his design was truly the best possible solution, he sent copies of his plans to England, to both the Oxford Society and the Cambridge Camden Society for comment. His design was acceptable to both, the Oxford Society in particular waxed lyrical, saying that his design "had realised the idea of a cathedral, as diverse from a parish church". However, Oxford wanted the roof of the aisles to be of steeper pitch, and a decorative moulding (or string course) around the interior walls, while Cambridge wanted more pinnacles and just one large window in the transept ends. Blacket obliged by making such changes as he could, but the string course and the rebuilding of the paired windows in the existent transept were impractical. Blacket had the model-maker J.C. White construct a detailed cardboard model of a scale 1 inch to 8 feet. This pleased the committee and the cathedral was finished much as demonstrated on the model, but with one very significant change: the west front, while retaining its form, had it details redesigned, in the light of the drawings that he received from Yorkshire. (Note: The model is still on display in the cathedral, along with a plan made in the 1930s to greatly extend the building; this never eventuated. Blacket and White's model was displayed at the Exposition Universelle de Paris in 1855 as an example of the finest work of the British Colonies.)

Blacket's modification of the west front is to a much richer and more vertical design. This was achieved by the adoption of several features of the famous façade of York Minster, including abandoning the paired "Magdalen College" windows in the uppermost stage in favour of large mullioned windows framed by a flamboyant arch rising to the level of the ornate parapet.

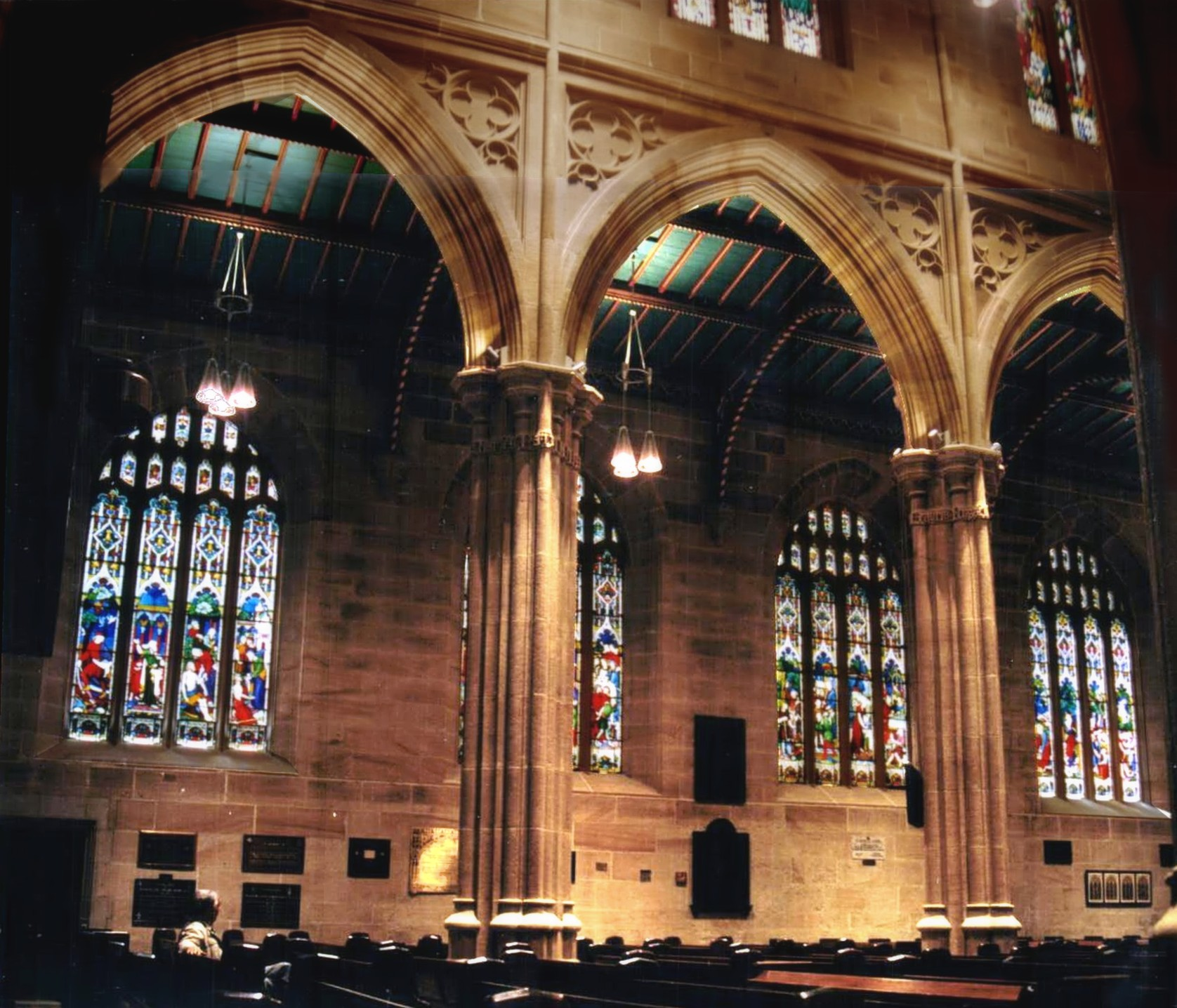
The nave is like those of 15th-century churches in Suffolk.

These are more strongly modelled than at York, and meet the obliquely set pinnacle above them in a continuous upward-sweeping movement. Another such flamboyant moulding rises from the tall central window to overlap the gable in a manner both complex and inventive.

The interior, despite its small scale, and the large size of the piers, (Note: The massive size of the piers is probably due to the fact that Sydney sandstone was untried for that purpose.) has a lofty, spacious and elegant appearance. It was furnished with richly carved furniture designed by Blacket himself and a cycle of 27 windows by John Hardman & Co. of Birmingham depicting the life and teachings of Jesus Christ. The cathedral was opened and consecrated on 30 November 1868 by Broughton's successor, Bishop Frederic Barker.

Joseph Kinsela writes, "Such is Blacket's grasp of English Late Gothic style that the interior could be taken for the product of the fifteenth century. There are no Victorian clichés.... Not many Australians are aware of the architectural status of St. Andrew's Cathedral...[it] is the equal of the best 19th century work in this style." However, not everyone was enthusiastic at the time, one critic writing, "We are compelled to say that seldom has so dull an inanity been produced at so great a cost."

== Colonial Architect ==
On 1 December 1849, while the construction of St Andrew's Cathedral was proceeding, Blacket was appointed Colonial Architect for New South Wales, succeeding Mortimer Lewis. He occupied this position for nearly five years, but there are few buildings remaining in Sydney from this employment with the exception of the small Water Police Office in a robust Classical style. His largest job was the Glebe Island Abattoirs and the Cape Moreton Lighthouse was also a significant undertaking. He spent much of his time in the country, supervising the building of wooden bridges, some of which have survived. When in Sydney, he was called out frequently to look at the leaking roof of Government House, but roof drainage was not one of Blacket's talents. (Note: Many of Blacket's buildings, including St. Andrew's Cathedral, and (notoriously) St. Stephen's, Newtown, have suffered from poor roof drainage.)

In 1851, gold was discovered, both in New South Wales and in Victoria. While trade and commerce thrived, the building industry lost its workforce. While work on many of the ecclesiastical buildings that Blacket had designed and continued to supervise came to a standstill, the Government had a sudden requirement for coach houses, escort stations and lockups, as well as a design for a secure coach to transport gold. Designs for all these were provided by the Colonial Architect, probably closely following plans sent from England.

In 1853, the Blacket family moved to a rented house in Glebe. It was a wild place at that time and Sarah feared for Edmund's safety as he walked home. The family had expanded to six children: Edith, was born in 1844, Alice in 1846, Arthur in 1848, Marian in 1850, Owen in 1851 and Hilda in 1854. The cost of living greatly increased owing to the gold rush and with six children to support and earning £300 a year, Blacket left the Public Service in September 1854, to be succeeded by William Weaver.

== University of Sydney ==
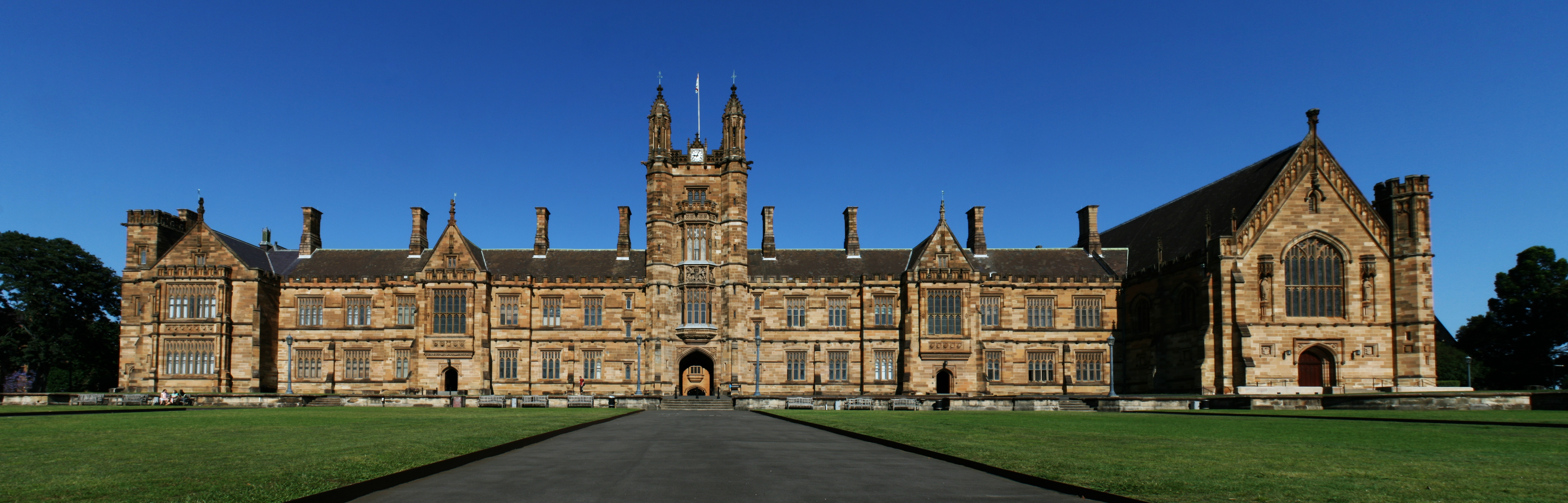
Main Building, University of Sydney

Blacket was involved with the foundation of Sydney University from the outset, and played a role in selecting the site on the Parramatta Road at the top of a rise overlooking Grose Farm (now Victoria Park). He was appointed University Architect on 23 May 1854, several days before he resigned as Colonial Architect, and he continued to supervise building for the Government for some months.

One of his first tasks as University Architect was to persuade the august committee to accept the notion that Perpendicular Gothic really was the only right and appropriate style for the building, because of its association with most colleges of both Oxford and Cambridge. The notes that he made for this speech are still in existence. Blacket was able to show the committee the sort of building that he intended, having to hand J. T. Emmett's design of the Congregational College on Finchley Road, north of London. Blacket asked his friend, the artist Conrad Martens, to create a watercolour drawing from his plans and elevations. Although the plans can not be located, the drawing is owned by the university and was engraved to appear in a newspaper.

The building is in the Perpendicular Gothic style with a front of 410 feet (125 metres) broken at the centre by a tower of 89 ft (27 m), beneath which there is a lofty archway, and surmounted by large pinnacles. The façade is broken by two gabled bays to the left, and one to the right, the right side of the building terminating in the Great Hall. While the whole exterior of the building, with its glowing sandstone, battlemented roofline and array of glinting leadlight windows give an imposing effect on top of the hill, it is the Great Hall that is regarded as the finest part of the design. The interior is loosely based on that of the Great Hall of Westminster, having a magnificent hammer-beam roof and a large mullioned and transommed window at each end. The windows of the long sides are placed high above an ornamented course in order that portraits may be hung beneath them, except at the south western corner where there is a large oriel window. The building has many rich details including the angels, which are carved on every hammer beam. The glass, by the English firm Clayton and Bell, represents men of learning, and is said to be the oldest complete cycle of Victorian stained glass. The Senate is said to have asked Blacket to sign his buildings; the Blacket coat of arms are on a chimney on the south wall of the main wing, and his initials, ETB, are on the façade of the Great Hall. Completed in 1861, the university soon became a tourist attraction; Anthony Trollope wrote home in 1874 that the Hall was "the finest chamber in the colonies", and that he could remember no college of Oxford or Cambridge which possessed a hall "of which the proportions are so good".

J. M. Freeland says of the architectural scene in Sydney in the 1860s, "The real architects of Sydney, in general, liked, respected and helped each other as friends. This peaceful situation was partly due to the overpowering presence of Edmund Blacket. Blacket bestrode the Sydney Architectural scene like a colossus."

During the period of the building of Sydney University, Edmund and Sarah added another two children to the family; Cyril was born in 1857 and Horace in 1860, taking the total to eight. In 1857, Edmund designed and built a home for his family, "Bidura", on Glebe Point Road. Nearby was "Toxteth Park", home of the solicitor, George Allen, a grand house built by the Regency architect, John Verge. The presence of this house seems to have influenced Blacket's design as the house he built for himself is entirely of a Colonial Regency style, with a hip roof and French doors opening onto a veranda with open cast-iron pilasters. In 1859, Blacket received his last letter from his father, who died in November 1858.

== Other buildings ==
=== Schools and institutions ===
At the University of Sydney, Blacket built the Anglican St. Paul's College and supervised the building of the Catholic College of St John's after the resignation of its designer William Wardell. Insofar as the building was completed, he was faithful to Wardell's design, but he omitted several features, such as the western cloister, for lack of funds. In 1881, Blacket designed the Clarke Buildings of Trinity College, a residential college affiliated with the University of Melbourne. These residential buildings were executed in brick, with decorative stone features and carved columns. He later also added a kitchen and staff accommodation block. A design for a chapel at the college was not proceeded with. The Clarke Buildings were extended and completed by Arthur Blacket in 1888.

One of Blacket's best known commissions was the extension of Sydney Grammar School in 1855. The building, occupying a highly visible position fronting onto College Street and overlooking Hyde Park in the City of Sydney, was begun by Edward Hallen in 1832, to a Regency design, but considerably smaller than intended. Because of the structure of the school board, Blacket's plans for the extension had to go before the Legislative Council for approval. He added a wing to either end of the building, respecting the proportion of the original, but with two floors where the earlier stage had one, and with the centre of Hallen's building having a Doric portico. The portico was not constructed until 157 years later, and in the intervening period, the design looked strangely vacant in the middle.

Blacket also designed the Avoca Street front of the Prince of Wales Hospital at Randwick, Mudgee Hospital and the ornate Blind Asylum on the corner of William Street. (Note: At a time when the NSW Builders' Labourers Federation led by Jack Mundey were becoming active in the preservation of Sydney's heritage, a number of Blacket's buildings such that built for The Liverpool and London Insurance Company on Margaret Street, were demolished overnight, which avoided protest, to be replaced by high rise development. Virtually the only mid 19th century palazzo-style building remaining in the Sydney CBD is William Wardell's New South Wales Club. The BLF placed a 15-year green ban the site of the demolished Blind Institute on Liverpool Street, built by Blacket in the Victorian Gothic style.)

=== Banks and commercial premises ===
Many of Blacket's banks date from the 1850s and 60s, as do many of his houses. Whereas churches and associated buildings were generally of the Gothic and occasionally of the Romanesque style, the Classical style was more usual for banks, many of them stylistically based upon the palaces of Renaissance Florence. These included The Bank of Australasia and The English, Scottish and Australian Bank, both on George Street, The Exchange Buildings on Spring and Gresham Streets and The Liverpool and London Insurance Company on Margaret Street. Of the banks and offices that Blacket designed within the Sydney CBD, several survived into the 1970s but were eventually demolished to make way for high-rise development. (Note: After the closure of Balmain Cemetery, the headstone was removed to Camperdown Cemetery.) One bank's neoclassical exterior survives on the corner of George and King Street, but the interior was gutted in 2011 to accommodate Louis Vuitton's flagship Sydney store. As late as 2008, when it housed the Blacket hotel, a few internal fittings – a staircase, and the bank vault among others – remained. Many of his small shops and commercial premises exist in other parts of Sydney such as Redfern and King Street, Newtown, but invariably with the street level façade altered beyond recognition.

Other commercial buildings included Mort's Wool Stores at Circular Quay, which are now demolished, and David Cohen's & Co general store in High St Maitland, which was originally three stories but only the ground floor, occupied by Centrelink, is now remaining after a fire in 1970.

=== Houses ===
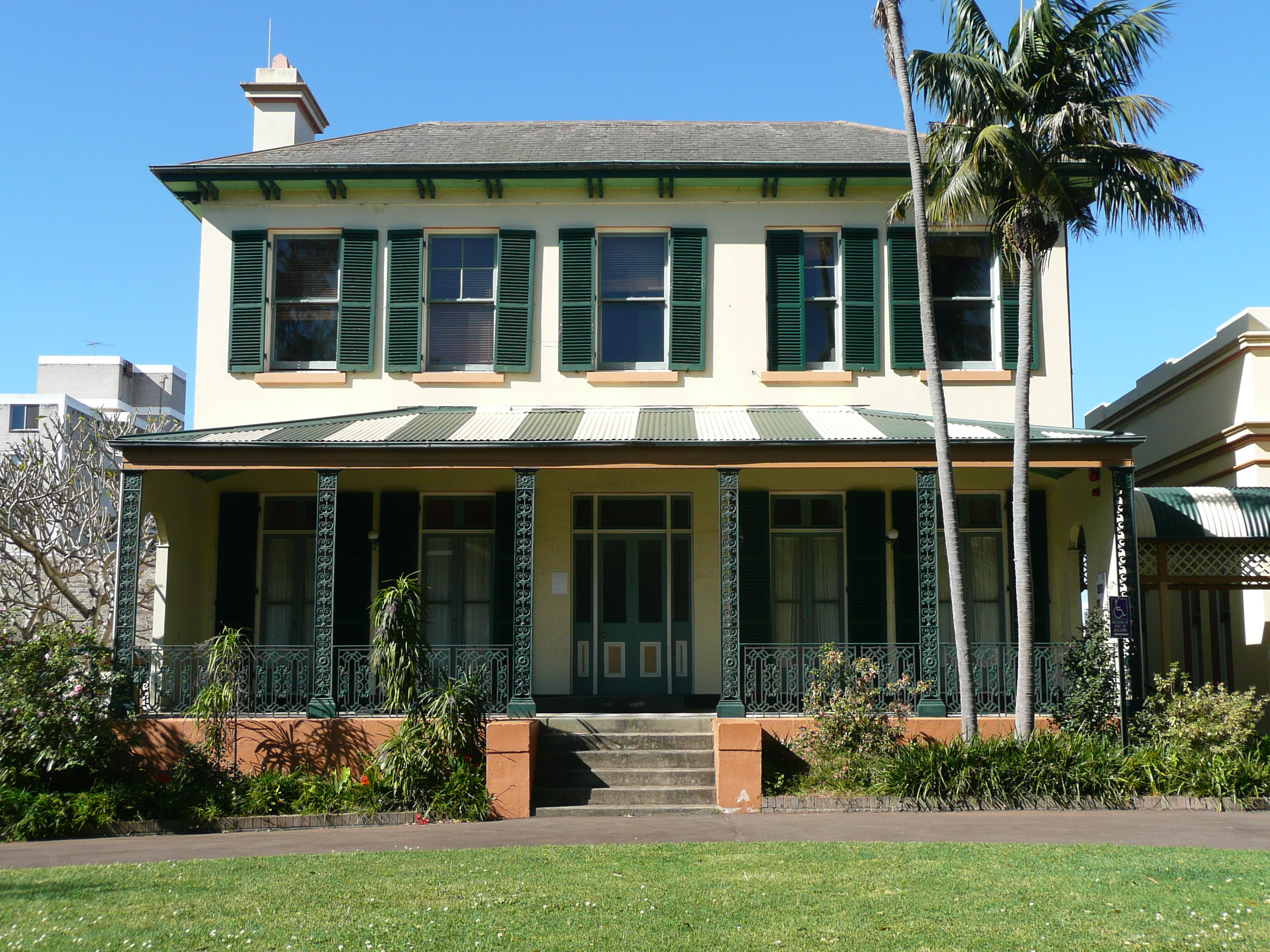
"Bidura", Blacket's home in Glebe

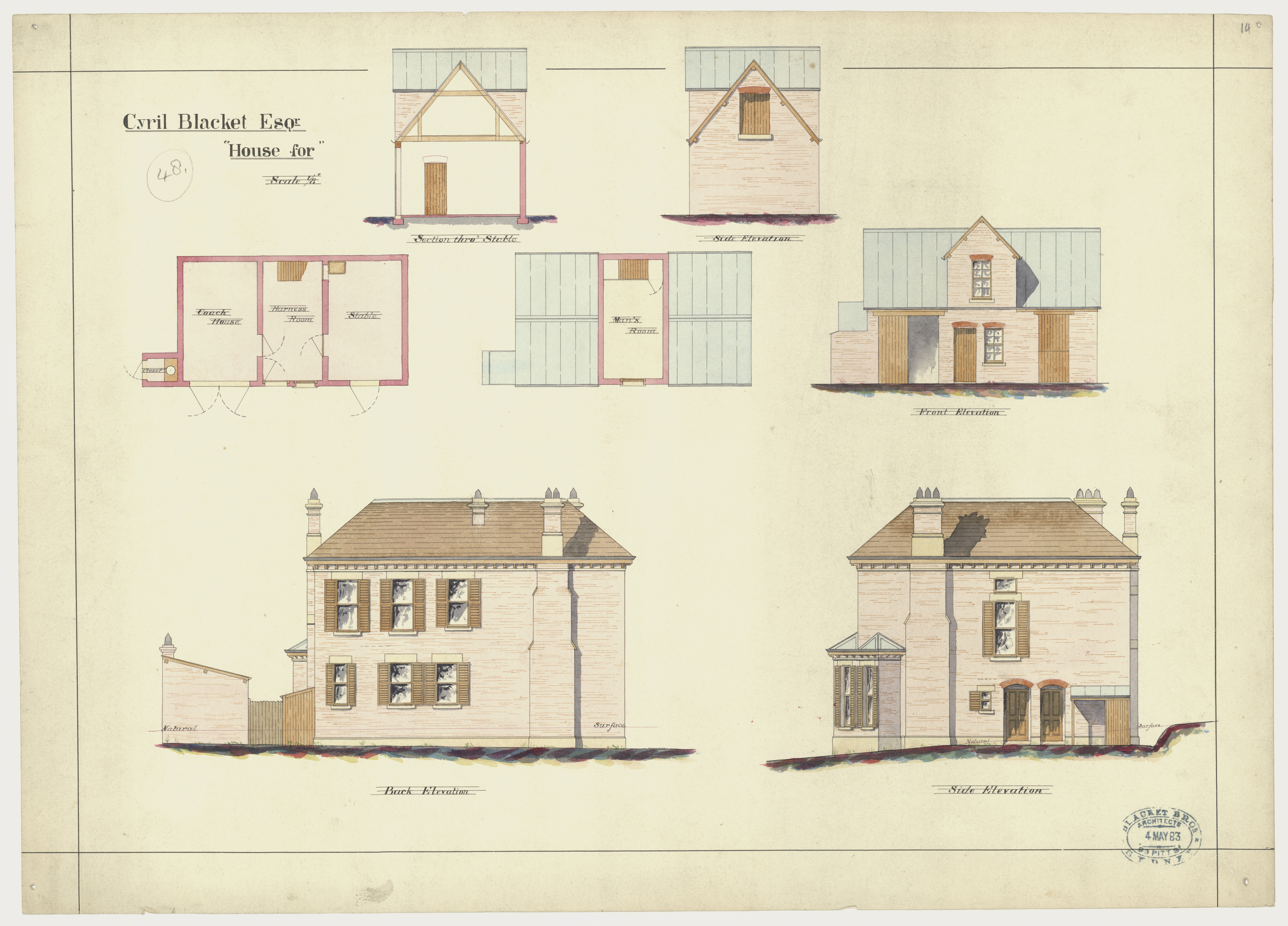
Bidura House. Glebe Point, Sydney, c. 1890, architectural drawing

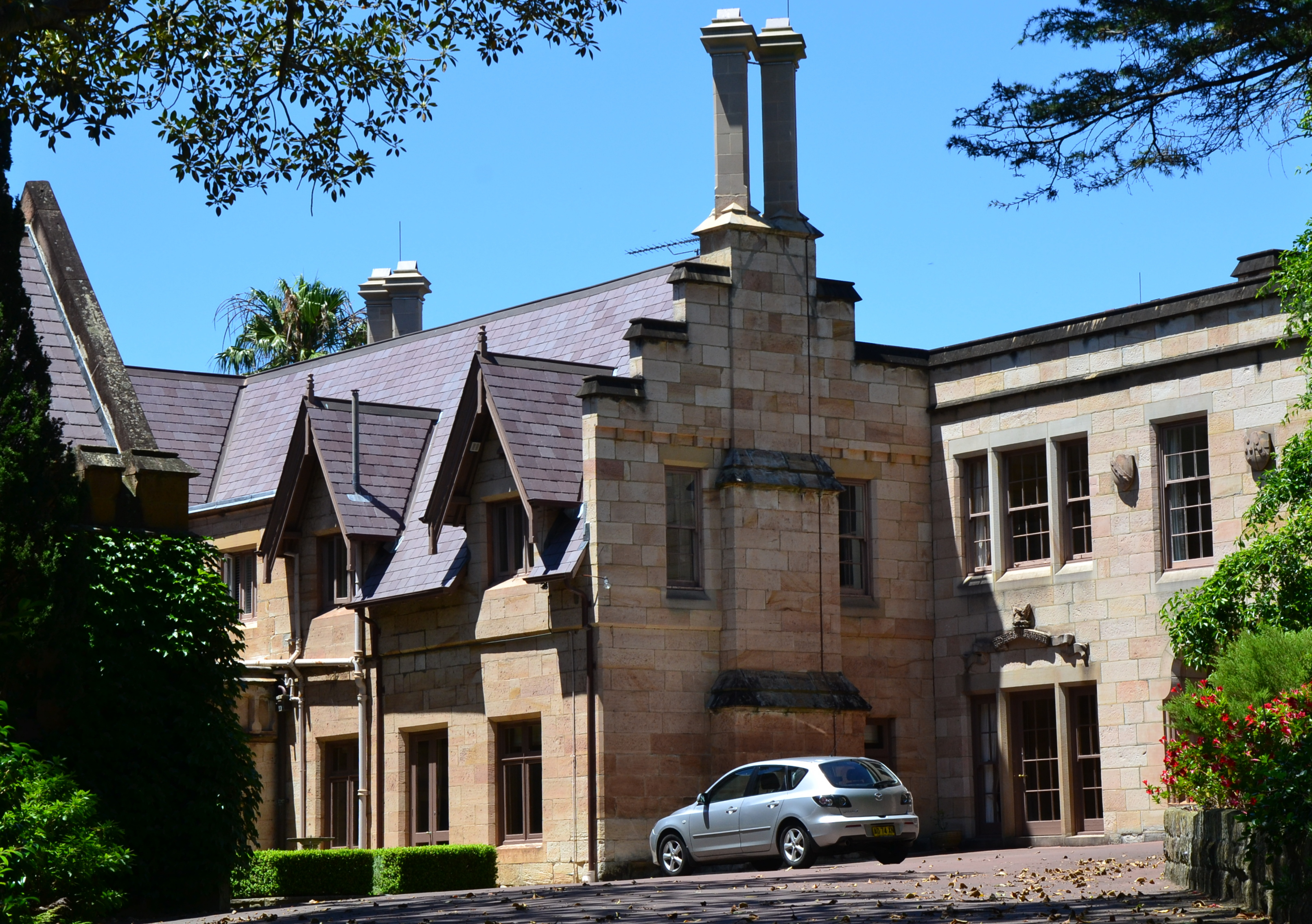
"Greenoaks" (now "Bishopscourt"), Darling Point, built for Thomas Sutcliffe Mort, (1840s-60)

Blacket built houses both great and small. They ranged from a little five-room house for E. O. Heywood on Glebe Point Road to Henry Cary Dangar's castle-like Grantham, formerly on Pott's Point. With its battlements, turrets, grand staircase and magnificent harbour views, Grantham rivalled Government House. Joan Kerr writes, "It was one of the grandest houses in Australia and certainly the grandest of this baronial Gothic type. Its demolition was an appalling loss...." Henry Gilbert Smith, the founder of Manly, was a favourite client whilst Blacket was in private practice, having designed his Georgian house, Fairlight House, two versions of the Style Hotel (both since demolished), and St Matthew's Church (also demolished), all in the Manly area.

Blacket also built several Anglican Church rectories, most of which are in a simple, asymmetrical, Gothic Revival style with gables and some Gothic detailing in the bargeboards and verandas, such as those at Berrima and Bega. He also remodelled Thomas Sutcliffe Mort's house Greenoaks in the Gothic style—it was since renamed Bishopscourt as the residence of the Archbishop of Sydney until its sale to private interests.

A common residential commission late in the practice was for rows of terraces. As three of his four sons, Arthur, Owen and Cyril, joined him, terraces became a major occupation for "Blacket and Sons". A row with decidedly eccentric aesthetic details, for which Cyril was almost certainly responsible, exists in Petersham, and is similar to those designed for W. H. Paling in 1881.

=== Churches ===
As an architect, Blacket is most famous for his churches. The exact number that he designed is unknown but totals more than a hundred, earning him the epithet, "The Wren of Sydney". His country churches, with their steep gables and small bellcotes are so familiar in New South Wales and established such a strong tradition that would be imitated across the land that it became a commonplace sight.

Blacket's churches range from small multi-purpose school-cum-churches to cathedrals. Several of his finest churches are among the most highly valued heritage buildings in Australia.

==== Small churches ====
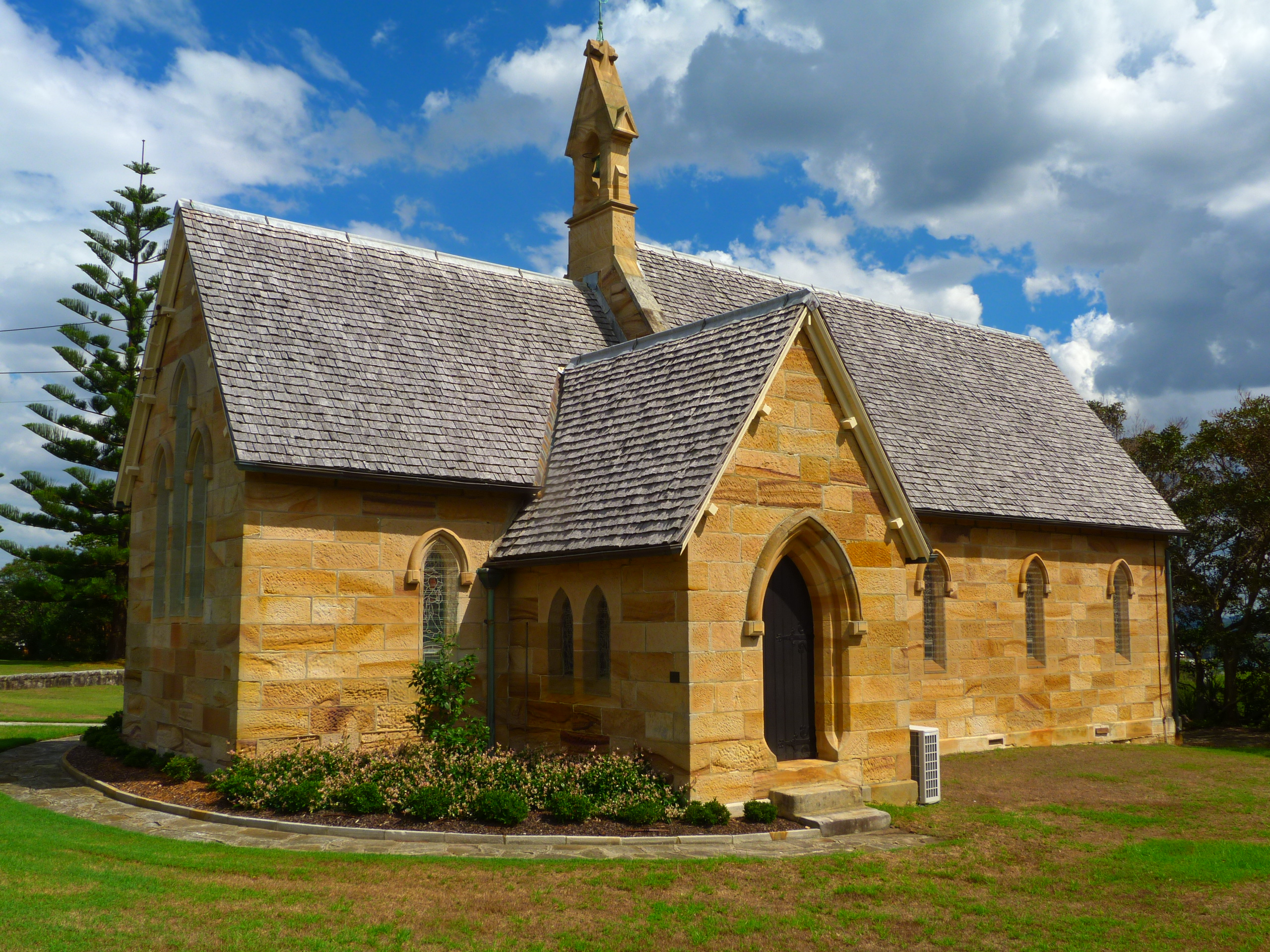
Blacket's small churches, such as St Peter's, Watsons Bay, (1864) are numerous and provided the model for later Australian churches, in stone, brick and weatherboard.

While the general outline of these buildings, with steeply pitched roofs, lower chancels and small bellcotes are easily recognisable, the form varies from tiny buildings like St Mark's Greendale, (1848) to the somewhat larger cruciform St Michael's, Wollongong, (1858). Even at a church as remote as St Mark's, which was surrounded by fields and forest, and had neither village nor full-time priest, the details of the design commanded Blacket's care, the little building having an elegant gable over its fluted doorway, and floral bosses, long since destroyed, at the ends of its drip moulding.

Blacket's small church designs varied in style from Norman at St Silas, Waterloo; to staid Early English Gothic as at St Peter's, Watson's Bay (1864) and St Thomas's, Narellan (1884); to Perpendicular at Holy Trinity, Berrima, (1847) a comparatively wide church spanned by a hammerbeam roof of unusual design.

==== Larger churches ====
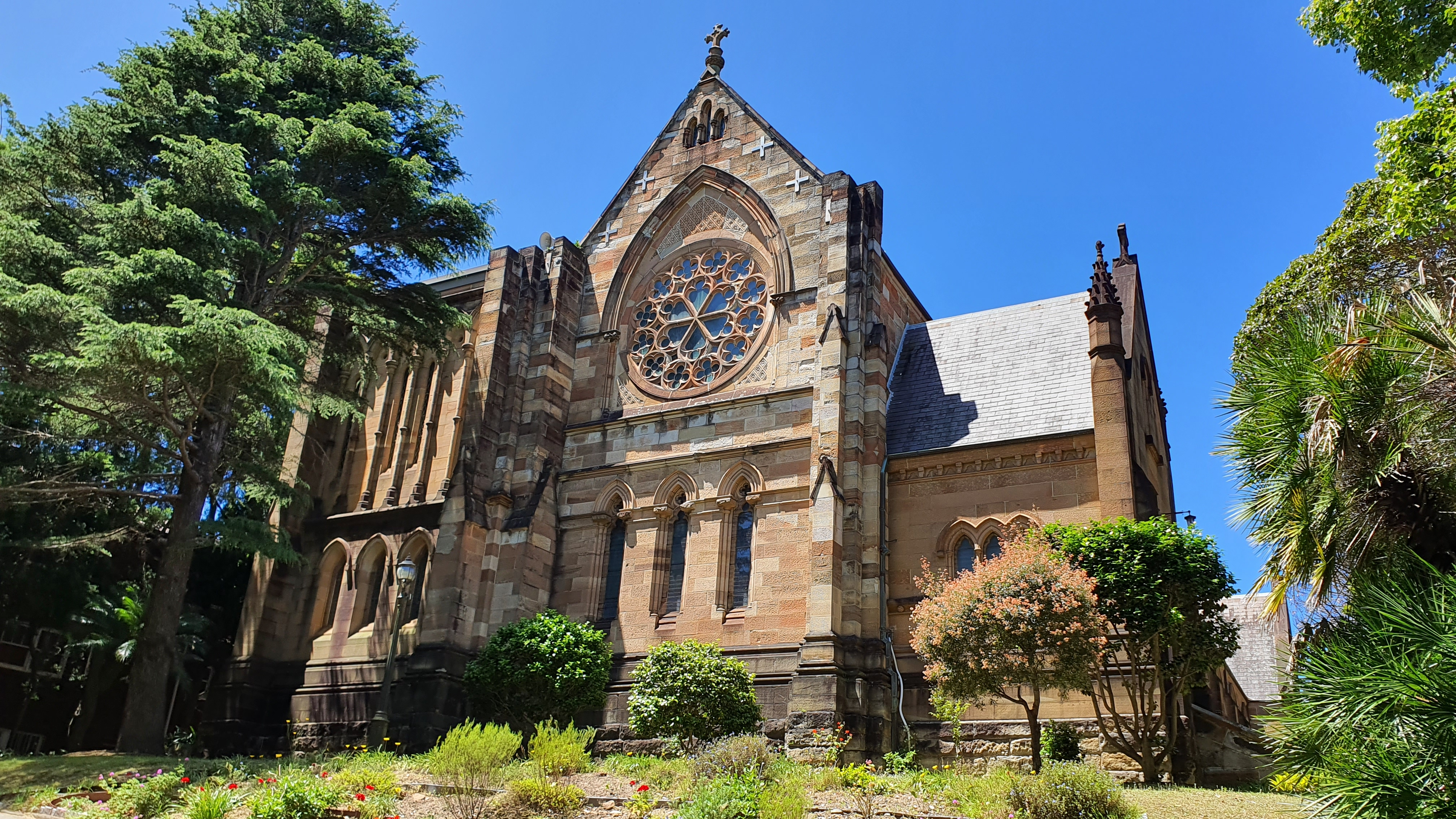
All Saints Church, Woollahra, (1874-82) is Blacket's most ornate design.

Many of his larger churches are among Blacket's best known buildings. The designs are extremely varied; Blacket could work in any of the medieval styles, and built larger churches in all of them, while the forms of the buildings range from the aisleless hall of St Mary's, Waverley; to the aisleless cruciform church of St Paul's, Burwood; to the triple-gabled church of St Paul's, Redfern, the aisled church of St Michael's, Surry Hills and the clerestoried church of St Stephen's, Newtown.

St. John the Evangelist, Glebe, 1868, is Blacket's most famous design in the Norman style, in which rich mouldings and carved capitals form a striking contrast with the plain round arches. Blacket also designed the major furnishings.

St. Thomas', North Sydney (1877–84), is a cathedral-sized building in the Early English style, it is of very robust external appearance, being of rusticated masonry and internally, very spacious. Designed by Blacket near the end of his career, it was built by his sons and grandson who provided the designs for much of the furnishings. Like a number of his later works, it has a rose window of an early French Gothic type. The spire was never completed.

All Saints Church, Bodalla, was designed to commemorate the life of Thomas Sutcliffe Mort, 'father of Australian dairying', and was built between 1880 and 1901 from granite quarried on Mort's estate. While a Blacket design, it is unlikely that he ever saw the site or the church which was overseen by his son Cyril. However, it also features hand-wrought iron hinges and straps said to have been designed by Blacket himself.

St Michael's Anglican Church, Surry Hills was first designed in 1854, but Blacket modified and reduced it, as required, to cut costs. The church plan accepted in 1882 is rare among Blacket's designs in having simple Geometric Gothic tracery in its windows rather than the Flowing Decorated style of which he was a master. All Saints, Woollahra, on the other hand, presents Late Geometric Gothic at its most opulent and ornamental.

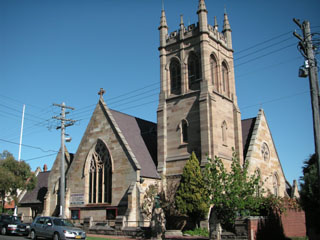
St Paul's Church, Burwood, is an essay in the Flowing Decorated Gothic.

Blacket's preferred style for a medium-to-large church was Flowing Decorated Gothic. Unlike the other historic periods of Gothic architecture, this style permitted him to vary the design of the tracery from window to window. This was far more time-consuming and costly than designing in the Early English or even the Perpendicular style, but it gave free rein to Blacket's creativity and skills as a draughtsman. During his time spent in Yorkshire during his youth, Blacket would have become familiar with two of the most famous of all Flowing Decorated windows in England, the west window of York Minster and the east window of Selby Abbey. The influence of these designs, and that of the equally famous east window of Carlisle Cathedral, can be seen in Blacket's east windows at Goulburn Cathedral; St Stephen's, Newtown; and St Paul's Burwood.

==== Cathedrals ====
Edmund Blacket was to design four cathedrals for the Church of England, All Saints, Bathurst, 1845; St. Andrew's, Sydney, (appointed architect 1846); St. Saviour's, Goulburn, 1874; and St. George's, Perth, 1878.

All Saints Cathedral, Bathurst, was a simple, lofty Norman design in the attractive local red brick of all Bathurst's older buildings. It was greatly enlarged in the late 19th century, and then mostly demolished and replaced because of subsidence.

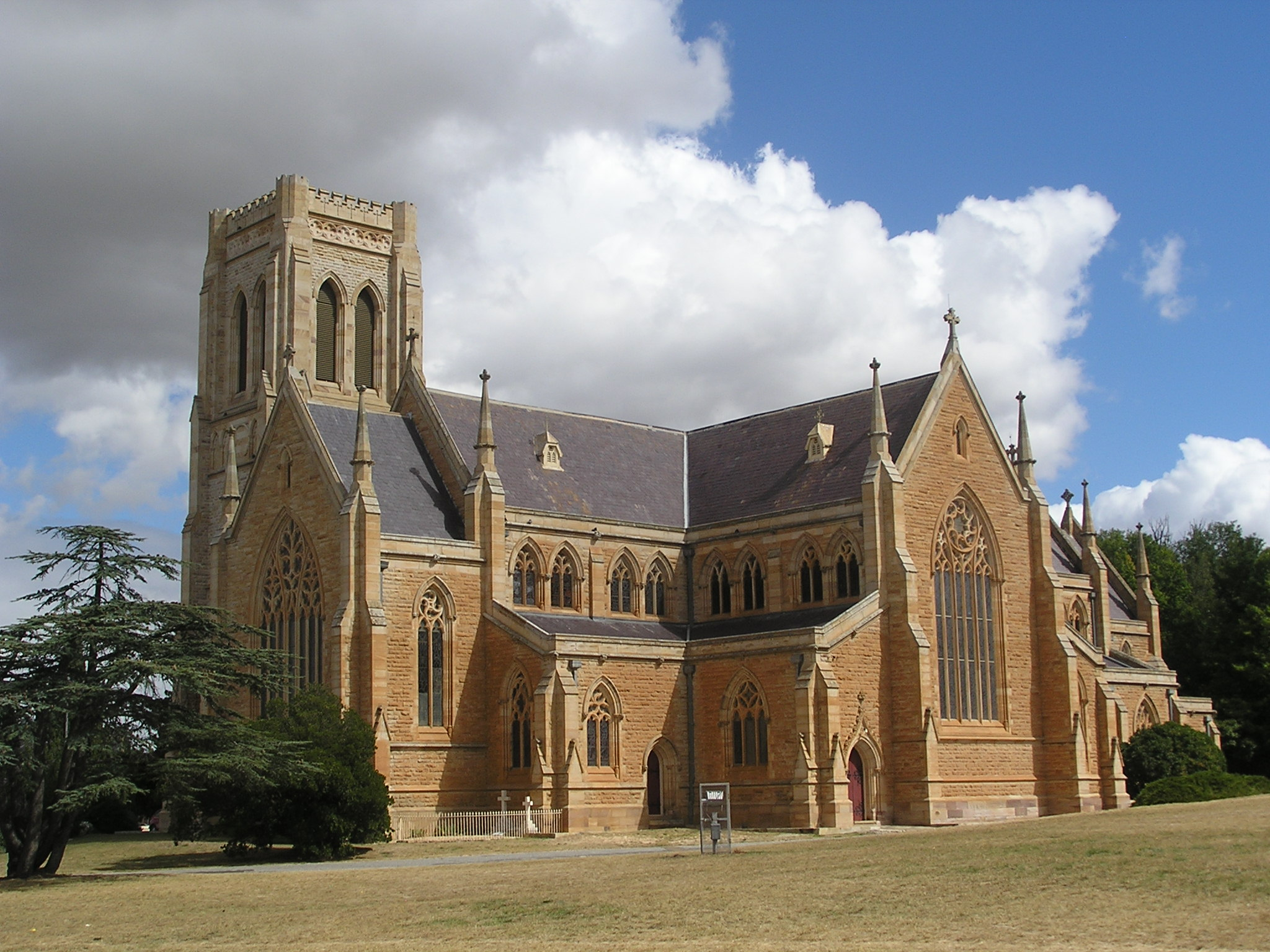
St Saviour's Cathedral, Goulburn, (1874), was intended to have a tall and decorative spire.

St. George's Cathedral, Perth, is also of brick, and the details are of a simple Early English design. Blacket designed a single tower and spire, asymmetrically placed and of majestic proportions. When a tower was eventually built, it was not of Blacket's design. Joan Kerr indicates that St. Saviour's Cathedral, Goulburn was one of Blacket's favourite buildings, as, unlike his cathedrals in Sydney and Perth, he was not hampered either by distance, or a previous architect's foundations. It was here that Blacket was able to really indulge a love of Flowing Decorated ornamentation. There are three very large windows, of seven and six lights in the chancel and transept ends, each with highly elaborate and distinct tracery, inspired by, but not identical to, famous Medieval windows. That in the North transept has a wheel based on the Visconti emblem of a window in Milan Cathedral, but by the judicious placement of two small tracery lights, Blacket has turned it into a sunflower, an emblem frequently used by one of the stained glass firms he employed, Lyon and Cottier. Other decorative features include the foliate carving of the capitals, much of it in the stiff-leaf style of Wells Cathedral; pierced cinquefoil openings in panels above the hammerbeams; and a screen of white New Zealand stone. (Note: In an act that has been described as "parochial vandalism", the interior of pale Marulan stone was painted white in the late 20th century.) The stained glass includes windows by two of England's major firms: John Hardman & Co. and Heaton, Butler and Bayne, and Sydney's two leading firms: Lyon and Cottier and Ashwin and Falconer.

Goulburn occupied much of the last nine years of Blacket's life, and ultimately, his family donated the crucifix which he had carved on his voyage to Sydney. At St. Saviour's, as at St. Georges, Blacket's tower and the ornate crocketed spire was not built in his lifetime. The tower, without the spire and pinnacles, was completed in the late 20th century.

==== Spires ====
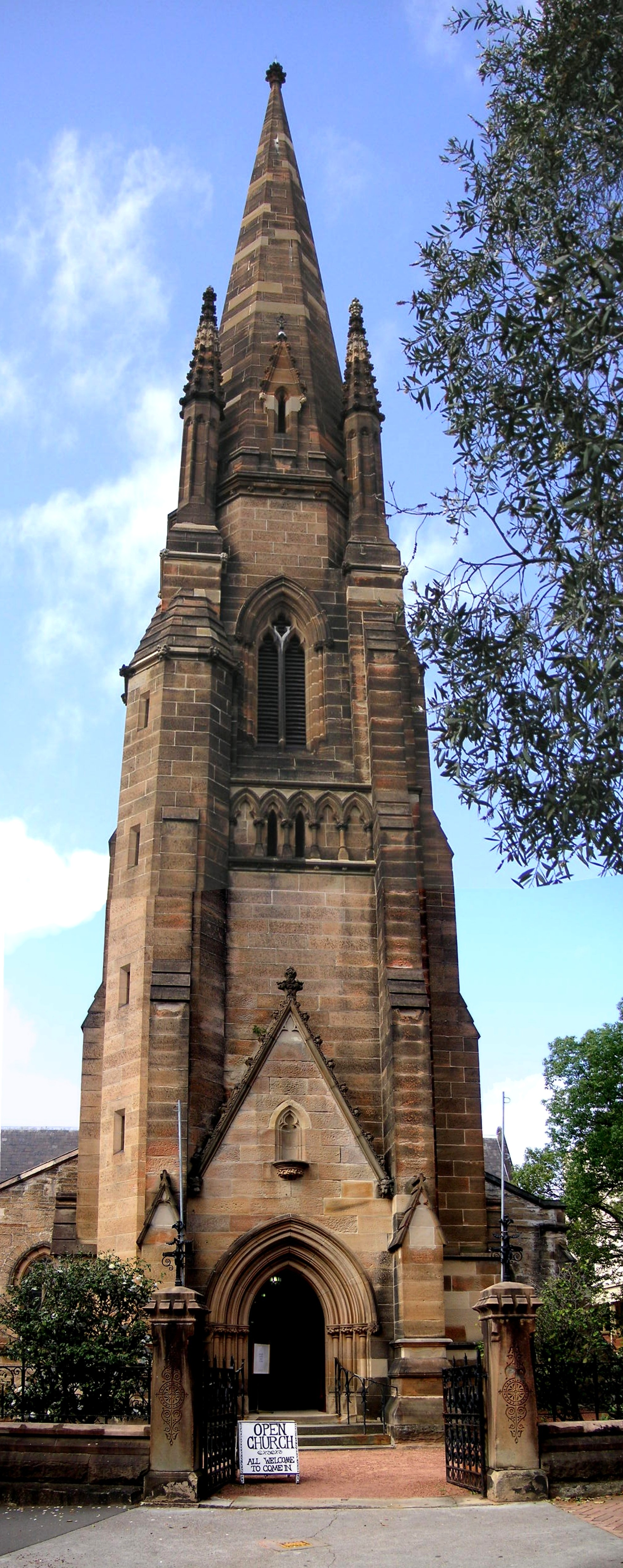
The spire of St. John's, Darlinghurst

The most visible signs of Blacket's career are the spires that he positioned on hilltops around Sydney and in several country towns. Unfortunately, among those proposed but never realised are the spires of three of Blacket's grandest churches, Goulburn Cathedral, St Thomas's, North Sydney and All Saints, Woollahra.

Among those that were completed, two are outstanding, those of St John's Anglican Church, Darlinghurst and St Stephen's, Newtown. As with the design of any spire, the architect faces the challenge of placing a structure of octagonal plan upon one of square plan and both structurally and visually bridging the difference. In both examples Blacket makes it "difficult to determine where the tower ends and the spire begins".

At St Stephen's (1871), the tower has an accompanying stair turret that rises to the level below the tall upper belfry window. At that level, both the tower and the top of the turret are encircled by a battlement, as if the tower itself might well end there, as it does at St Paul's, Redfern. But it does not; it rises, somewhat narrower, and visually reduced by the clever play of overlapping forms. Each of the tall windows on the four sides is set into a slightly projecting plane, with its own gable, very similar in form to that which Blacket often used around doors. These rise like dormers between the broaches, overlapping the meeting of the spire and the tower, so the horizontal definition between the two occurs only at the corners. Unfortunately, in the 1990s the large poppyhead on the top of the spire became unsafe and was removed which has lessened the visual impact.

At St John's the design is even more complex, because, near the top of the upper window, the tower itself suddenly appears to become octagonal in horizontal section, before the spire is reached. The change to the section is masked by the presence of four large pinnacles which rise from the corners at this point, as if they were sitting on the buttresses but are in line with the tower itself. Behind the pinnacles, once again Blacket has placed an encircling battlement which appears to mark the point where the tower ceases to be tower and becomes spire, or vice versa. Harmonious with the four crocketed pinnacles, and on the same level, are little dormer windows.

Morton Herman writes of the spire of St Mark's, Darling Point, that it is a conspicuous landmark for miles around, "contrasting...yet part of the silhouette of the hill, amply demonstrating Blacket's ability to make buildings seem inevitable on their sites." Herman says of the Sydney landscape that "had St Mary's, Waverley, and All Saint's, Woollahra, gained their intended spires the main heights of the whole district would have culminated in Blacket spires and provided impressive sights from all points of view".

== Later life ==
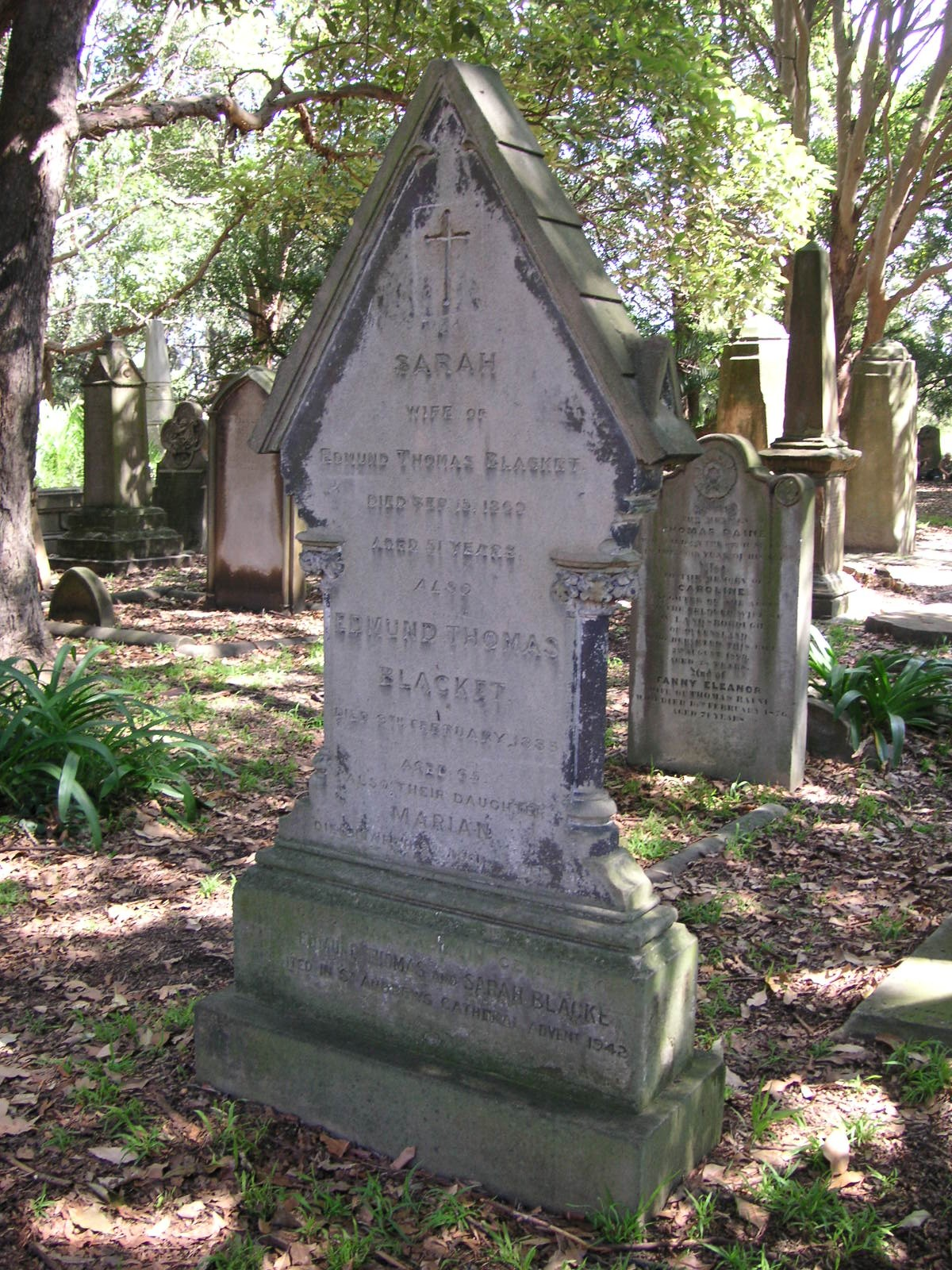
The tombstone Blacket designed for his wife Sarah, relocated from Balmain to Camperdown Cemetery

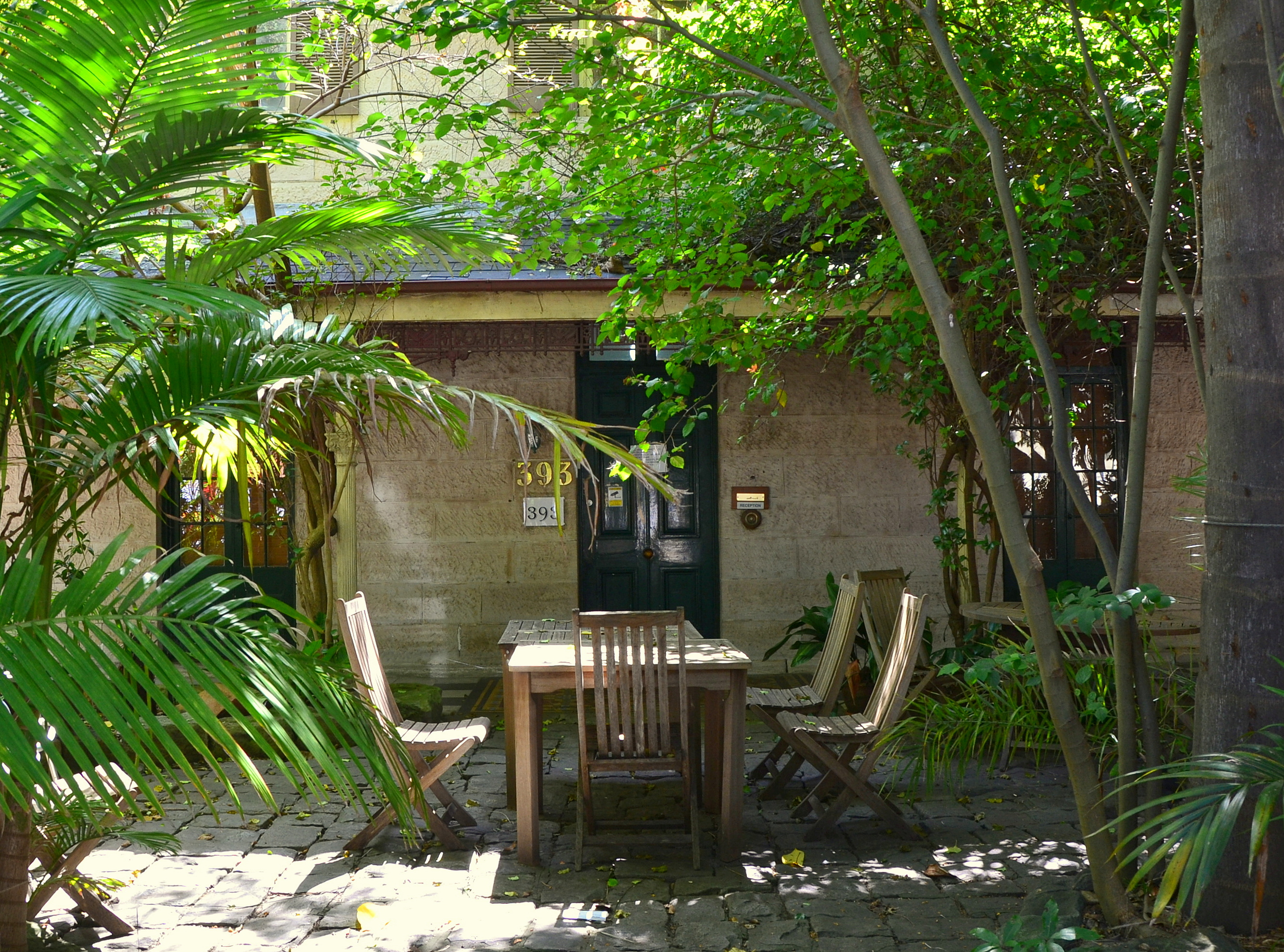
Blacket's home in Balmain, Sydney

On 15 September 1869, Sarah Blacket died, aged 51 years. Cyril and Horace were at this time only 12 and 9 respectively. Marion, the third daughter, was 19. She was to remain unmarried and in her father's household, caring for her four young siblings. Sarah's body was buried in Balmain Cemetery with a simple headstone of a gabled Gothic form. (Note: See Note q. above.) According to Morton Herman, Blacket had "always consulted her about every important matter, before he ever gave a final decision, for as long as she lived".

A year after Sarah's death, Blacket sold "Bidura" and moved to Balmain, living for a time in a house owned by his brother Russell. He was to remain in Balmain until about 1880, despite the fact that it was a notorious place with its own force of six police necessary to keep order. In his last few years he lived in "Roland Villa", Petersham, near the home of his son Cyril and his wife.

=== Death ===
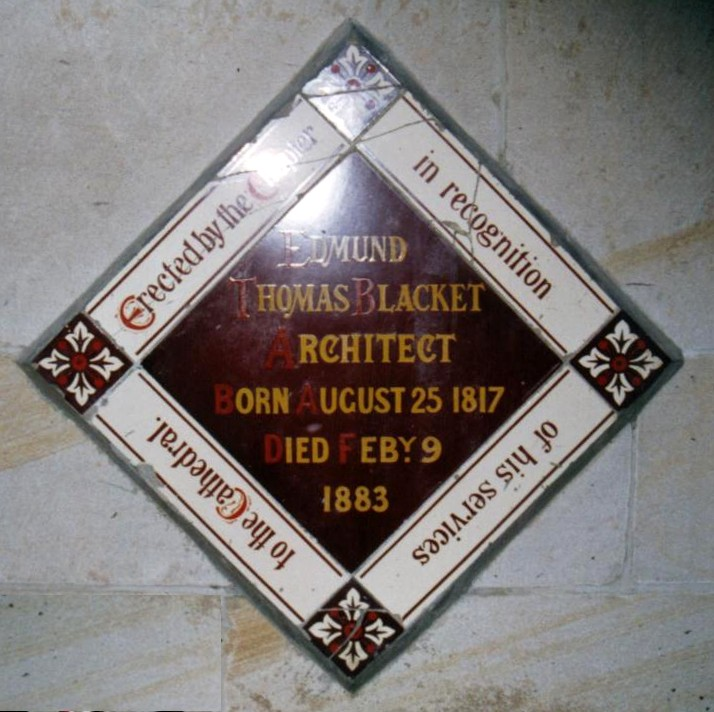
The memorial hatchment to Edmund Blacket in St. Andrew's Cathedral

Edmund Blacket died suddenly from "apoplexy" on Friday 9 February 1883 aged 65 at his home "Roland Villa", Croydon Street, Petersham, Sydney. The daily papers, as far away as Perth, where St. George's Cathedral was under construction, carried obituaries praising him and citing Sydney University as "probably the finest structure in the Australian Colonies". His funeral on Saturday 10 February 1883 was well attended and the coffin bearers included three of Australia's most distinguished architects: William Kemp, John Horbury Hunt, and the Colonial Architect, James Barnet.

Blacket was buried with his wife in Balmain Cemetery, and his name was added to the tombstone that he had designed for her, but at the closure of Balmain Cemetery in 1942, their ashes were removed to St. Andrew's Cathedral, where an enamel hatchment and a small brass plaque mark the place of their interment. Their memorial stone was relocated to Camperdown Cemetery.

As a person, Blacket was held in high esteem, those who knew him recalling his good qualities for later historians; H. G. Woffenden wrote in the 1960s: "Edmund Blacket was an upright God-fearing man who shunned controversy, professional publicity and social acclaim. An exemplary husband and father, he had been churchwarden and alderman, and was widely respected and admired for honesty, diligence, accuracy, fortitude and propriety."

== Influence ==
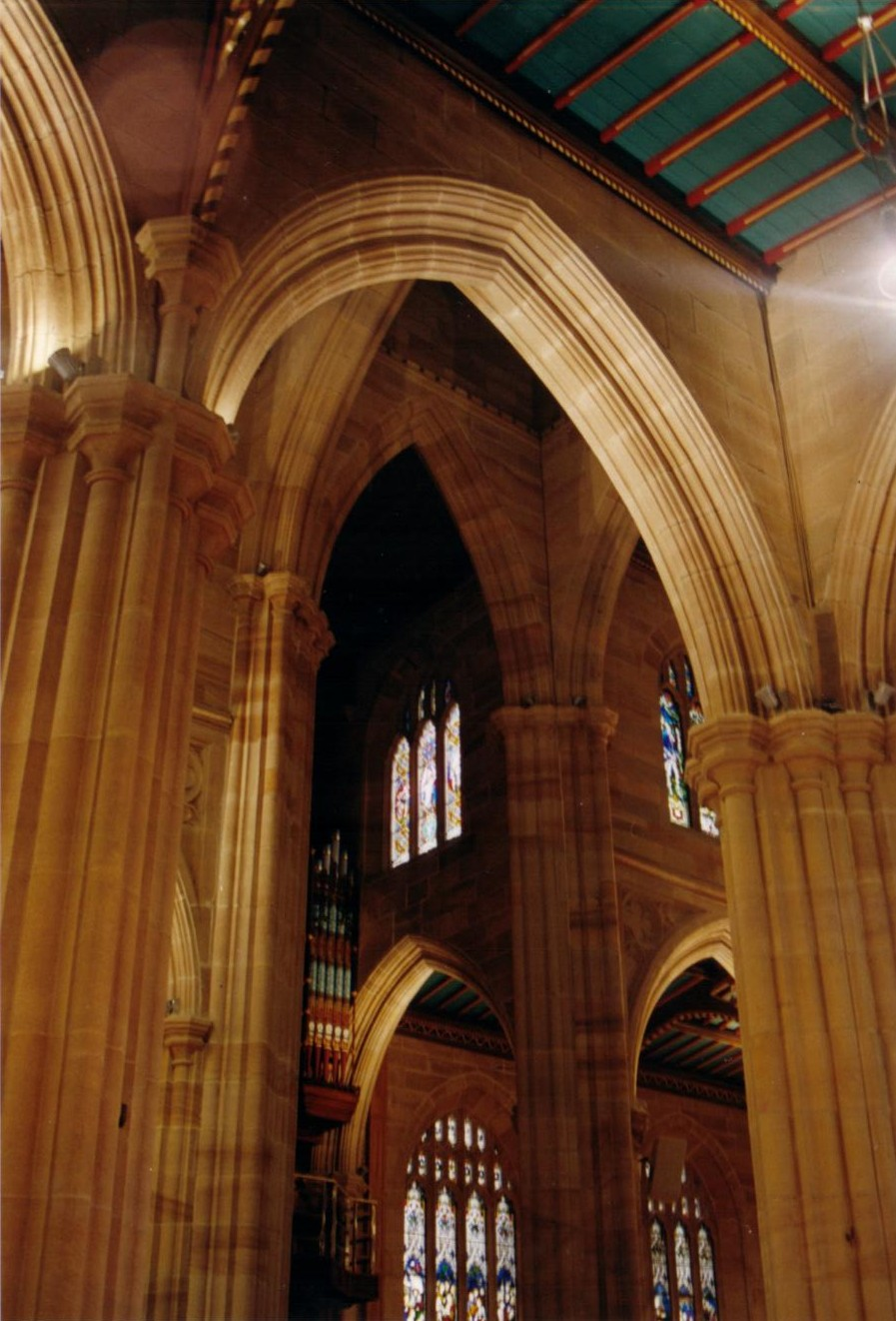
The view across the transept of St. Andrew's Cathedral, Sydney, shows Blacket's mastery of the Late Gothic idiom.

Blacket's architectural practice was to be one of the most influential in Australia's history. His first articled pupil was William Kemp whose apprenticeship was interrupted when Blacket became Colonial Architect. During the 1860s, Blacket's son Owen began training, followed by Cyril in 1872 and the older son, Arthur, who worked in the "Blacket and Sons" business in the 1880s.

In 1880, Cyril travelled to England where he took his examination at the Royal Institute of British Architects, returning to Australia to put up his plate as "Cyril Blacket A.R.I.B.A.". In 1903, he was elected president of the New South Wales Institute of Architects. After Edmund's death, Cyril and Arthur worked for a time as "Blacket Brothers", the most famous building of this period being the Hunter Baillie Memorial Presbyterian Church (1886) which from its position on the ridge pays homage across the suburbs of Annandale and Camperdown to their father's spire of St Stephen's, Newtown, on the parallel ridge. (Note: The spire of Hunter Baillie Memorial Church, at about 60 metres (200 ft), was the tallest in New South Wales until the completion of the spires on St Mary's Cathedral in 2000 at 74.6 metres (245 feet)) Cyril's other well-known work is the chapter-house for St. Andrew's Cathedral. Two later Blackets, Cyril's son Pendril and Harold Wilfred Blacket were to follow the family tradition as architects.

During the 1850s, Blacket employed James Barnet, who had emigrated from Scotland, having studied architecture under C.J. Richardson. He worked for Blacket as Clerk of Works for Sydney University, and it has been suggested that the massive hammer-beam roof of the Great Hall may have been his design. Barnet was to become the most successful of the Colonial Architects, with many of his public buildings still serving their original purposes.

Of all the architects associated with Blacket, the one who would become most famous was John Horbury Hunt, who worked with him from 1863 to 1868. It was at this time, that Blacket's architecture developed bolder forms, based upon Norman, Transitional and Early French Gothic architecture, rather than the more refined Gothic. This is particularly noticeable in the presence of simple round windows divided by four circles of tracery in the gables of several churches of this time. Blacket permitted his staff to enter competitions, and it was while at Blacket's office that Horbury Hunt won the commission for Newcastle Cathedral, to be executed in his preferred material of brick. The brick church at Tumut, consecrated in 1873, is ascribed to Blacket, but appears to owe much to Hunt. Hunt, who lived most of his early life in North America, had previously worked under Edward Clarke Cabot. One of the innovations that he introduced to Australian architecture while working for Blacket was the saw-tooth roof for industrial building, which was employed at Mort's Woolstore. Hunt appears to have been influenced by the Arts and Crafts Movement, particularly Philip Webb, and ultimately he created buildings of great originality such as the Anglican Cathedrals of Grafton and Armidale.

=== Critique ===
Not all critiqued Blacket's contribution favourably, with Woffenden opining in his 1967 biography drawn from his thesis that Blacket "... put tradition before innovation... [and] as a consequence stylistic development was severely restricted; quality declined as other less dedicated practitioners exploited popular taste by substituting burlesque plagiarism for scholarly eclecticism."

== Partial list of works ==
While Edmund Blacket's university buildings have been maintained and continue in use, few of Blacket's commercial buildings have survived, with none of his Sydney banks remaining. Residential buildings are better represented, and include cottages, terrace houses and mansions.

Of Blacket's more than 100 designs for churches, 84 can be identified as having been built to his plans, with a number of others being detailed or substantially designed by his sons Arthur and Cyril. In addition he supervised the building of several other churches and made major contributions to a dozen more, such as the towers and spires at St John's, Darlinghurst and Christ Church St. Laurence, the chancel of St John's, Camden and the roof of St. Judes, Randwick.

== See also ==
- Architecture of Australia
- Francis Greenway
- John Horbury Hunt
- John H. Buckeridge
- Burcham Clamp
- Blacket Prize

== Bibliography ==
- Freeland, J. M. Architect Extraordinary, the Life and Work of John Horbury Hunt: 1838–1904, (1970) Cassell Australia, ISBN 0-304-93990-0
- Freeland, J. M. Architecture in Australia, (1972) Pelican, ISBN 0-14-021152-7
- Herman, Morton. The Blackets, an Era of Australian Architecture, (1963) Angus and Robertson, ISBN 0-207-13454-5
- Kerr, Joan. Our Great Victorian Architect, Edmund Thomas Blacket, (1817–1883), (1983) The National Trust of Australia, ISBN 0-909723-17-6
- Kinsela, Joseph. St Andrew's Cathedral, Pictorial History & Guide, (1986) Argyle Press Goulburn, ISBN 0-909625-95-6
- Kinsela, Joseph. Goulburn Cathedral, (1984) Argyle Press, ISBN 0-9591339-0-9
- Kirtley, Allan; Longbottom, Patricia; Blackett, Martin (2013). A History of the Blacketts. The Blacketts. ISBN 978-0-9575675-0-4.
