= List of Edmund Blacket buildings =

This is a list of buildings designed in part or full by Edmund Blacket. Blacket was an Australian architect, best known for his designs for the University of Sydney, St. Andrew's Cathedral, Sydney and St Saviour's Cathedral, Goulburn.

While Edmund Blacket's university buildings have been maintained and continue in use, few of Blacket's commercial buildings have survived, with none of his Sydney banks remaining. Residential buildings are better represented, and include cottages, terrace houses and mansions.

Of Blacket's more than 100 designs for churches, 84 can be identified as having been built to his plans, with a number of others being detailed or substantially designed by his sons Arthur and Cyril. In addition, he supervised the building of several other churches and made major contributions to a dozen more, such as the towers and spires at St John's Anglican Church, Darlinghurst and Christ Church St Laurence, the chancel of St John's Church and the roof of St Jude's Church, Randwick. Of these churches, 80 are known to remain substantially intact. Of the churches and cathedral listed below, all are Anglican (formerly the Church of England in Australia), unless otherwise stated.

== Buildings ==
Work	Suburb/city	Type	Style	Completed	Involvement	Image	Notes
All Saints' Church	Condobolin	Church		1879	Architect (attributed)		
All Saints' Church	Tumut	Church	Norman-influenced Gothic Revival	April 1888	Architect		
All Saints' Church	Woollahra	Church	French Geometric Gothic Revival	1882	Architect		
Aston Lodge (subsequently named: Loreto Sisters' School, Mount St. Joseph, Little Sisters of the Poor Novitiate, International Grammar School, and now Emanuel School)	Randwick	Initially private home; now school	Victorian Italianate	1864	Architect		
Bidura	Glebe	Private home	Victorian Regency	c. 1860s	Architect; Principal residence		
Bishopscourt, formerly known as Greenoaks	Darling Point	Private home, formerly a presbytery, and initially a private home	Gothic picturesque	1849	Architect		
Christ Church	Geelong	Church		c. 1847	Architect		
Christ Church	Jugiong	Church		1873	Architect		
Christ Church St Laurence	Haymarket	Church			Spire only		
Christ Church, Rouse Hill	Rouse Hill	Church		1862	The only example of Blacket's work still surviving in The Hills Shire		
Church of Holy Trinity	Berrima	Church	Gothic Revival	1849	Architect		
Church of the Holy Innocents	Rossmore	Church	Gothic Revival	1850	Architects: Richard Cromwell Carpenter; Edumund Blacket		
Clarke's Building, Trinity College, Melbourne	Parkville, Melbourne	Residential college		1887	Architect		
Craigholme	Darling Point	Private home		1859	Architect		
Fairlight House	Fairlight	Private home	Victorian Georgian	May 1860	Architect		since demolished
Garrison Church	Millers Point	Church	Gothic Revival	1878	Co-architect with Henry Ginn		
Goat Island Queen's Magazine	Sydney Harbour	Military garrison		1850	Co-architect with Mortimer Lewis and Alexander Dawson		
Graythwaite	North Sydney	Private residence; now part of Sydney Church of England Grammar School	Victorian Italianate	1885	Co-architect with Goold and Hilling		
Holy Trinity Church	Kelso	Church rectory	Gothic Revival	1877	Architect		
Hunter Baillie Memorial Presbyterian Church	Annandale	Presbyterian Church	Gothic Revival	1889	Designed by Blacket's sons, Cyril and Arthur Blacket		
Jenner House (subsequent use as Fleet Club, Stramshall, Jenner Private Hospital, Kurragheen, Lugano)	Potts Point	Private residence	Regency Revival; Victorian Italianate	1871	Architect with John Horbury Hunt; Thomas Rowe: second floor		
Liverpool Hospital (former)	Liverpool	Hospital		1874	Second architect; Design of buildings A & F		
Maitland banks: Bank of New South Wales (now Westpac); Commercial Banking Company of Sydney (now NAB)	Maitland	Banks		1860; 1864	Architect		
Northwood House	Northwood	Private residence		1878	Architect		
Prince of Wales Hospital	Randwick	Hospital					
St Alban's Anglican Church	Muswellbrook	Church	English, Victorian Gothic Revival	1869	Builder; supervised by John Horbury Hunt		
Holy Trinity Dubbo	Dubbo	church	Gothic				
St Andrew's Cathedral and Chapter House	Sydney CBD	Cathedral	Perpendicular Gothic	1868	Architect		
St George's Cathedral	Perth	Cathedral	Victorian Academic	1888	Co-architect with Thomas Whitney		
St James' Church	Morpeth	Church	Old Colonial Gothic Picturesque	1840; 1862; 1875	Architects: Edward Charles Close (attrib.); Blacket; John Horbury Hunt		
St John's Church	Ashfield	Church		1843; 1875	Second architect; Design of transept and chancel		
St John's Church (also known as St John the Evangelist Anglican Church)	Camden	Church	Gothic Revival	1849	Architects: John Cunningham; Sir George Gilbert Scott; Blacket		
St John's Church (also known as St John's Anglican Church Newcastle; Church of St John the Evangelist; and St John's Cooks Hill)	Cooks Hill, Newcastle	Church	Old Colonial Greek Revival	1860	Architect		
St John's Church	Darlinghurst	Church	Gothic Revival	1875	Transept; Spire		
St John's Church	Wilberforce	Church	Victorian Gothic	1859	Architect		
St John the Evangelist Church	Glebe	Church	Victorian Romanesque	1870	Co-architect with John Horbury Hunt; Tower designed by Cyril Blacket		
St John the Evangelist Church	Wallerawang	Church	Victorian Gothic	1881	Architect		
St John the Evangelist Church	Wollombi	Church	Old Colonial Gothic Picturesque	c. 1846	Original architect; Design and supervision of extensions		
St John's College	University of Sydney	Residential college of the Catholic Church	Gothic Revival	1862	Co-architect with William Wardell		
St Jude's Church	Randwick	Church	Victorian Gothic	1865	Attributed architects: Blacket, or; Simeon Pearce		
St Mark's Anglican	Greendale	Church; Rectory	Victorian Gothic Revival	1848			
St Mark's Church	Darling Point	Church; Rectory	Academic? Gothic Revival	1854; 1879	Architect: (spires completed post-mortem)		
St Mary's the Virgin Church	Maitland	Church	Victorian Gothic	1867	Architect		
St Mary's Church	Waverley	Church	Ecclesiastical Gothic Revival	1864	Architect		
St Matthew's Church	Manly	Church	Victorian Gothic	1865	Architect		demolished in 1928
St Michael's Cathedral	Wollongong	Cathedral	Victorian Gothic	1859	Architect		
St Michael's Church	Surry Hills	Church	Gothic Revival	1854	Architect		
St Michael's Church	Vaucluse	Church					
St Nicholas Anglican Church	Goulburn	Church	Semi Norman	1880	Architect		
St Paul's College	University of Sydney	Residential college	Gothic Revival	1858; 1859; 1864	Radford and Blacket Wing; West Blacket Wing; Three bays of cloisters		
St Paul's Church	Burwood	Church	Gothic Revival	1871	Architect		
St Paul's Church and former Rectory (Rectory repurposed as a private residence)	Carcoar	Church; Rectory	Gothic Revival	1849	Architect		
St Paul's Church (now the Cathedral of the Annunciation of Our Lady)	Redfern	Church now a Greek Orthodox cathedral	Colonial Decorated Gothic	1855	Architect		
St Peter's Church	Richmond	Church	Victorian Rustic Gothic	1863	Second architect; Rectory additions		
St Peter's Church (also known as St Peter's Church, Cooks River)	St Peters	Church	Old Colonial Gothick Picturesque	1839	Architects: Thomas Bird; Edmund Blacket; George Allen Mansfield; Professor Leslie Wilkinson		
St Peter's Church	Watsons Bay	Church		1864	Architect		
St Philip's Church	Sydney CBD	Church	Victorian Gothic with English Perpendicular detail	1856	Architect		
St. Saviour's Cathedral	Goulburn	Cathedral	Victorian Gothic	1884	Pro-Cathedral; Cathedral; (spires completed post-mortem)		
St Simon's and St Jude's Church	Bowral	Church		1874	Architect		since demolished and replaced
St Stephen's Church	Newtown	Church	Victorian Rustic Gothic	1874	Architect		
St Stephen's Church	Willoughby	Church	Gothic Revival	1884	Architects: Edmund Blacket; Arthur Blacket		
St Thomas' Church	North Sydney	Church	Victorian Gothic	1883	Architects: Edmund Blacket; Cyril Blacket		
Skellatar House	Maitland	Private home		1883	Architect		
Steyne Hotel	Manly	Public hotel		1859; 1864	Architect		since demolished with a newer structure
Sydney Grammar School	Sydney CBD	School		1857	North and South Blacket rooms		
Tocal Homestead	Tocal	Homestead	Late Georgian/ Regency Revival	1922	Architects: William Moir; Edmund Blacket		
Water Police Court (currently used as the Justice and Police Museum)	Phillip Street, Sydney CBD	Court house	Australian classic revival	1855	Architect; subsequent developments by: Alexander Dawson; James Barnet		
Yaralla Estate (also known as Dame Eadith Walker Estate and Dame Eadith Walker Hospital)	Concord	Private home; subsequently converted to a hospital	Victorian Italianate	1864	Architect		

St Clements Anglican Church, Yass NSW St James Anglican Church, Townsville QLD Trinity College University of Melbourne VIC Holy Trinity Church, Kameruka NSW (built by Charles Galli)

== See also ==
- Architecture of Australia
