= St John's Anglican Church Precinct =

St John's Anglican Church
- St John's the Evangelist Anglican Church
- St John's Anglican Church Precinct
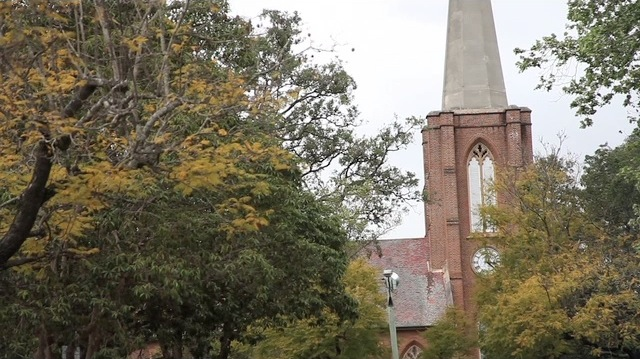
- St John's Church, pictured in 2010

- Location in greater metropolitan Sydney
- 34°03′24″S 150°41′49″E
- Location: 6-22 Menangle Road, Camden, Camden Council, New South Wales
- Country: Australia
- Denomination: Anglican
- Website: www.sjcamden.church

History
- Status: Church
- Dedication: Saint John the Evangelist
- Consecrated: 7 June 1849 by Bishop William Broughton

Architecture
- Functional status: Active
- Architects: John Cunningham; Sir George Gilbert Scott; Edmund Blacket
- Architectural type: Church
- Style: Gothic Revival
- Years built: 1840–1849
- Completed: 1842

Specifications
- Materials: Brick, stone, slate, stained glass

Administration
- Diocese: Anglican Diocese of Sydney
- Parish: St John's, Camden

New South Wales Heritage Register
- Official name: St John's Anglican Church Precinct; St John's the Evangelist Anglican Church
- Type: State heritage (complex / group)
- Designated: 24 August 2018
- Reference no.: 2006
- Type: Church
- Category: Religion
- Builders: Richard Basden; John Le Fevre (brick spire and framing); J Bates & Son, London (organ)

St John's Anglican Church Precinct, also known as St John's Camden, is a heritage-listed Anglican church and associated precinct at 6–22 Menangle Road, Camden, Camden Council, New South Wales, Australia. The precinct comprises the church, rectory, cemetery, two church halls and grounds that provide a rural landscaped environment to the group. The dominant feature of the precinct is the historic St John's the Evangelist Anglican Church. Its architects are unknown, and could be the cumulative work of Mortimer Lewis, John Cunningham and Edmund Blacket. It was built from 1840 to 1849 with Richard Basden responsible for the nave and John Le Fevre adding the spire. 1874 saw the addition of the chancel and vestry, their builder is unknown and the design is likely the work of Sir George Gilbert Scott and Blacket. A feature of the church is an organ manufactured by J. Bates & Son, London. The Anglican Church Property Trust of the Diocese of Sydney holds the property in trust, under the Anglican Church of Australia Trust Property Act 1917 (NSW). The precinct was added to the New South Wales State Heritage Register on 24 August 2018.

St John's Anglican Church and its precinct are one of the most complete parish church groups in New South Wales. All the land and a lot of the buildings were gifted by the Macarthur family or their family company. The present day boundaries are at least 8 hectares (20 acres) less than their maximum extent. In early 2016, the rectory was first leased and in 2018 it was reported that the local Anglican parish council sought to sell around 60 percent of the current precinct for development as an aged care facility to fund the construction of a new worship centre near the existing St John's Church.

== History ==
=== Traditional custodians ===
Few records exists of the people who inhabited the area before the arrival of the British, there is little doubt the Camden area saw extensive use. The Camden district sits on the boundaries of three groups. The Gandangara were the people of the Camden town and the areas to the west and south, the Dharawal/Tharawal to the south and east and the Darug to the north. The naming and grouping of the people is complex and uncertain. The plight of the traditional owners is poorly documented as contemporary accounts record the events from the settler's perspective. There are reports of 70% mortality due to a smallpox epidemic. The cemetery contains graves of a number of indigenous people and some plots were provided by the Macarthur family.

=== British settlement of Camden ===
The first recorded trip by the colonists to the area was in August 1790, when Marine Captain-Lieutenant Watkin Tench, William Dawes and George Bouchier Worgan undertook a seven-day expedition to the south-west of Rose Hill (renamed Parramatta in June 1791) travelling until they reached Mt Prudhoe on the Razorback Ridge. Except for the discovery of a river, they reported nothing very interesting.

First hints of the potential of the district surfaced in 1795 when rumours of the existence of the missing first fleet cattle reach the colonists. So Governor Hunter dispatched Henry Hacking to confirm the reports. Hacking's report was so satisfactory that on 18 November 1795 Hunter set out to the district. On 20 November, Hunter in company with Captain Waterhouse, George Bass, David Collins and others crossed the Nepean and found a herd of over forty cattle. The next morning, they sighted the full herd of over 60 head and conclusively determined the herd were descendants of the missing cattle. The party reported "The country where they were found grazing was remarkably pleasant to the eye; every where the foot trod on thick and luxuriant grass; the trees were thinly scattered, and free from underwood, except in particular spots; several beautiful flats presented large ponds, covered with ducks and the black swan, the margins of which were fringed with shrubs of the most delightful tints, and the ground rose from these levels into hills of easy ascent."

Hunter decided it was best to leave the herd undisturbed for future consumption and export and resolved to guard the herd against any attempt to destroy it. unter's successors continued the policy of protection. However, by 1819 the preservation became too troublesome and Governor Macquarie decided to incorporate as many as possible into tame Government herds and open the whole area for settlement. In 1826, Governor Brisbane gave the order to slaughter the remnants.

On a 1796 sketch of the area, Hunter labeled the district as ‘Cow Pasture Plains’. Good reports of the area continued, following a visit by Governor King and his wife in December 1803, the area was described as ‘Exclusive of the very fine pasturage, the soil appears equally well calculated for tillage as are the Banks of the Hawkesbury’. The area first attracted tourists as early as 1804.

In 1789 John Macarthur joined the New South Wales Corps as a lieutenant with "every reasonable expectation of reaping the most material advantages". On 28 June 1790, Macarthur arrived in the colony on the Scarborough. He was accompanied by this wife Elizabeth (née Veale) and infant son, Edward. A daughter born on the voyage did not survive, Edward and John barely survived. Macarthur was the only officer to bring his family to the colony. The family focused on improving their situation and in 1800 Macarthur valued their holdings of more than 526 hectares (1,300 acres) acres at £4,000. Macarthur's family consisted of his wife Elizabeth, sons Edward (now at school in England), John, James and William and daughters Elizabeth and Mary. Another son, James, passed in 1794.

In 1801, Governor King sent Macarthur to England to face a court-martial for wounding Lieutenant-Colonel Paterson in a duel. Macarthur arrived in England in December 1802 with his son John and his daughter Elizabeth. Britain was at war and short of good quality wool. Macarthur seized the opportunity. He promoted his ability to solve the wool problem, resigned his commission, gained the patronage of the British Government and backing from Lord Camden. He returned to the colony in his ship, the Argo, on 5 June 1805 with merino sheep from the King's flock and documents requiring Governor King to grant him 2,023 hectares (5,000 acres) in Cowpastures and convict labour. The choice of this land likely the result of correspondence with Captain Waterhouse.

On 16 January 1806 Macarthur wrote to Governor King acknowledging receipt of the grant and the creation of what was to become known as Camden Park Estate.

=== Camden Park and the Macarthur Family ===
Working together, the family continued ‘improving their situation’. Macarthur estates at Camden reached their maximum extent of ten separate grants totalling some 11,209 hectares (27,698 acres) acres in 1837 and were valued at £200,000 in early 1840s. The Macarthur family's other land holdings were extensive that extended beyond Camden Park including interests in all Nineteen Counties such as 7,284 hectares (18,000 acres) at Taralga and 24 hectares (60 acres) freehold in Sydney. The Precinct and the township of Camden are part of 2,185 hectares (5,400 acres) purchased by John Macarthur on 5 October 1825 for an annual rent of £135 for 20 years.

In 1831, the family turned their attention to the construction of house for the estate. The design is a sequence of commissions and abandoned designs, traced through a series of unbuilt schemes and houses at Camden, Parramatta and Pyrmont by Henry Kitchen and Henry Cooper, James Smith and John Verge, the cottages orné Belgenny and Hambledon, and the design of Elizabeth Farm at Parramatta, to the final Palladian architecture house. John Macarthur took an active interest in the construction which finished in 1835, shortly after his death in 1834. His sons James and William Macarthur took up occupancy in the new house, while their mother Elizabeth continue to reside at Elizabeth Farm in Parramatta. The house remains in the hands of a direct descendant of John Macarthur. On John Macarthur's death in April 1834, his Camden estate passed to William and James as tenants in common, Elizabeth Farm was retained by Elizabeth, and Edward inherited the rest of the Macarthur estates. Elizabeth and her unmarried daughters (Emmeline and Elizabeth) were to receive annuities paid by their brothers. Around this time, the security of the Macarthur estates from public access diminished. The main route between the County of Cumberland and the southern counties passed through the Macarthur estates. In April 1833 James Macarthur complained of the damage done to fencing, by fire and trespass and the infection of his valuable flocks by scabby sheep passing through the property.

The property division on John's death, the considerable expenses of the construction of the homestead, security, the cessation of the assignment of convicts to private service, drought, and poor economic conditions caused a significant upheaval in operation and financing of the estate. James and William responded by bringing free labourers out to the Colony using Governor Bourke's bounty system. With the introduction of these immigrants, the demographic structure of the Camden Park workforce changed dramatically from an almost exclusively male domain to one with families. The model of management turned to estate tenants on small farms of about 12–16 hectares (30–40 acres) with incentives and opportunities for individuals to improve their situation. James and William established a model of paternalistic benevolence and management typical of English gentry. Their superior wealth and social standing enable him to dominate their community, a system entirely at odds with the entrepreneurial spirit of the Colony.

In 1836 a plan for the private town of Camden went to the Surveyor-General's office. The project provided for the erection of a church, "the situation of which will be highly picturesque and commanding." The position of the Church was deliberate with clear sight lines to the main house.

James and William were intelligent and capable men and their interests and morals were to characterise the development of the Camden Park Estate. Of the many things which they were fond of, such as theatre and history, they had a special interest in a well-made or picturesque landscape that could encapsulate and frame the works and lives of men and women. Consequently, during the early development of the estate they spent much time and money on developing the beauty of its landscape, which in time incorporated the township of Camden. James and William saw to the construction of three well-made and purposefully placed structures, St John's Anglican Church, Camden Park House, and the monument on John Macarthur's grave, that helped to form a triangular arrangement of subtle and elegant picturesque vistas. This was especially when they were contrasted with the intrinsic beauty of the surrounding "natural" landscape. Form the earliest trespasses of Europeans into this region they had considered the Camden landscape to be beautiful, almost a work of art, and satisfactory to the aesthetic notions of the time that valued the combination of the natural and the artificial (the works of man - anthropogenic). Adapting or improving this original canvas with the works of men could only add to its beauty in the minds of the Macarthurs and their contemporaries.

=== The establishment of the Township of Camden ===
The construction of the Great South Road with a river crossing over the Nepean River along the north boundary of the Camden Park Estate in the early 1820s ultimately served as the goad for the establishment of a Township in the area. In 1826 this crossing was replaced by a bridge which more effectively opened up the land to the south for settlement and the mere existence of the bridge encouraged the development of a settlement. The fact that there were no major settlements along the Great South Road for considerable distances each way from the Cowpastures also encouraged the establishment of a police lock-up at Camden that could patrol the road and protect settlers against bushrangers.

Consequently, in December 1830 a group of local residents petitioned Governor Darling for the establishment of settlement, comprising a police station, court-house, goal, and church, near the Cowpastures Bridge. Darling liked this idea and began arranging for the establishment of a 130-hectare (320-acre) township to serve as a local administrative centre. However, due to most of the land along the Nepean being a flood plain and nearly all of it also having been granted away the NSW Government had no existing Crown Land on which to establish a township. The Surveyor-General Thomas Mitchell recommended the land on the south bank of the Nepean on a rise close to the river being the most ideal choice, but this location was part of the Camden Park Estate. As John Macarthur had not signed the petition and was not amenable to the idea of giving away any of his Estate for this purpose, the plan was shelved at this time.

James and William Macarthur were of the same opinion as their neighbours that a township would be to the benefit of the district, but they were unable to change their father's mind. Following John's death and their establishment as the official heads of the Estate they were able to re-commence the plans for a township. In the interval the government had chosen Campbelltown as the main administration centre in the southern districts, but this allowed James and William to develop their own private township in accordance with their own ideals. They were keen to promote public order (along with a keen social order) that reflected a spiritual one that could encourage and regulate the minds and souls of the people. To this end an Anglican church was to form the imposing and commanding centrepiece of their new township.

The Macarthur brothers had the 8-hectare (20-acre) area for their township cleared during the winter of 1835. On this foundation they desired that the first building to be constructed should be a church. To this end they appealed to their neighbours and employees for assistance and subscriptions to fulfil this goal. James was the main force behind this scheme. He was more religious than William and convinced that religious progress was beneficial, but that it should not be forced on the lower classes by the gentry, but rather be the result of the combined effort and initiative of all classes. This was to encourage a collective and mutual dependence among the population that was in keeping with Christian teachings and tenets. In this way, James pictured this church as growing from the land from the combined effort of the people so that it could be a focus of their moral behaviour and a symbol of the inter-reliance of society for its common good. However, he still demanded that it be an Anglican church, in accordance with its status as the Established Faith, despite the fact that people of a number of different denominations resided in the area.

James and William had amassed A£644 in subscriptions by September 1835 for the construction of an Anglican church. Of this total they had promised A£500, while their employees had offered A£43, and their neighbours the remainder. This allowed them to write to the government outlining their plans for a township and offering a copy of the subscription list as evidence of the commitment of the local population. They envisioned that the town would include reserves for a police station and lock-up, courthouse, post-office, and for churches of the several denominations: Anglican, Catholic, and Presbyterian, that flourished in the area.

The Government approved these plans and the Surveyor-General Thomas Mitchell began the process of town planning in consultation with the Macarthur brothers in January 1836. In accordance with his ideals, Mitchell designed Camden as being a rectangle with two crossing main streets near its centre: the one running east–west was to be the highway and the other (John Street) running north–south being a vista to the town's Anglican church. This church was to crown a hilltop overlooking the town and, specifically gaze down into the centre of rectangle and the commercial district. In this way, Mitchell designed the church to be a focus for the town, while also being above and beyond it. Mitchell characteristically liked towns to have axes, squares, and meeting places and he often used the natural landscapes of places, such as hills and valleys, to emphasize these features. Camden was a more simple example of this type, but this does not prevent it from being a successful and highly picturesque and commanding one.

Despite this beginning it was not until July 1841 that the town allotments were offered for sale at auction. At this time the population of the Camden Park Estate was around 200-300 and there were eight households and a post office in the township. There was also regular traffic along the Great South Road through the township. These inducements encouraged the sale of half of the 44 one-half-acre (0.20 ha) township blocks but up for sale for high prices and the beginning of increased settlement.

=== The construction of St John's the Evangelist, Camden ===
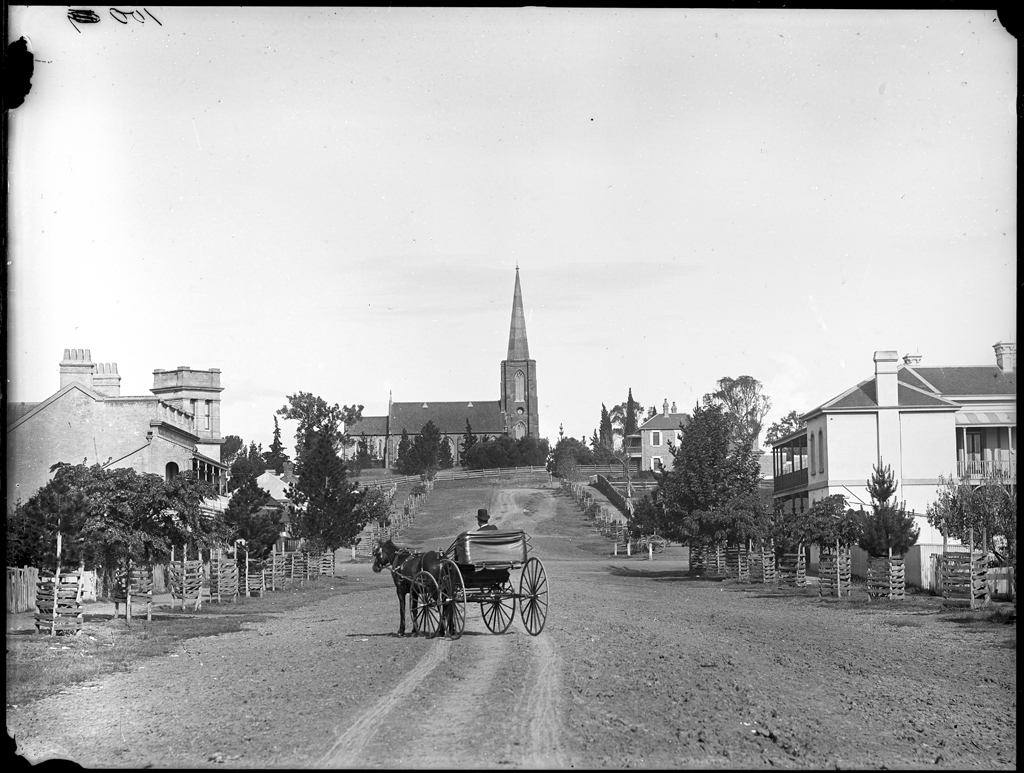
The church set in the streetscape, pictured c. 1900.

During the early days of settlement of the Cowpastures, particularly after the 1820s when the landholders began to live in the area, religious services were undertaken through the employees and members of each estate coming together for prayers. Early in their residency at Camden Park it appears William and James organised these events with William at least occasionally conducting readings. By 1826 the Reverend Thomas Reddall, chaplain of St Peter's, Campbelltown began conducting services at Kirkham on the north bank of the Nepean. In March 1827 Thomas Hassall was appointed Chaplain of the Cowpastures and settled at Denbigh near Cobbitty and he soon began his regular circuit of the properties and settlements within his parish, which included Camden Park.

The Macarthur's plans for Camden and it crowning jewel - its Anglican Church - in late 1835 lucky coincided with the introduction of Governor Burke's Church Act the following year. This Act was designed to promote the buildings of churches and chapels and provide for the maintenance of Ministers of Religion. This Act offered pound for pound subsidies for the construction of churches of all the major denominations. In this manner it removed the de facto "established church" status the Church of England had enjoyed in the colony to this point by providing equal access to state funding for the major denominations. The subsidies were available for churches and rectories costing between A£600 and A£2,000. These building had to be designed by a competent architect and be approved by the Colonial Architect to be eligible for the subsidy. A subsidy of A£1,000, towards the total cost of A£2,500 of the church, was provided to the Macarthurs under this Act. The Reverend Hassall, Charles Cowper of Wivenhoe, James and William Macarthur, and George Macleay were appointed trustees of the church.

While the 1836 Church Act provided substantial funds for church construction Bishop William Broughton and the Anglican Church were hamstrung by the lack of competent architects in the colony to realise their dreams and ideals. Consequently, Broughton was initially forced to rely on James Hume to design the church. He commissioned Hume to design the church in the classical style in 1837. This design was initially accepted by Broughton, and assumedly the Macarthurs, but it was abandoned by late 1839 at the request of Emily Macarthur, James' new wife, who objected to the classical design and preferred something in the Gothic Revival style which was the current new vogue in England.

James Macarthur had travelled to England in 1836 and whilst there met Emily Stone (1806-1880) in 1838. Stone was the daughter of Henry and Mary Stone. Henry was a civil servant (and later banker or their family had banking connections) and Mary was the daughter of Dr William Roxburgh, a botanist with the East India Company. Emily Stone was born in India and she travelled to England in 1811. Macarthur and Stone married in 1838 and travelled to the Colony, arriving in March 1839. Emily became the first lady of the new Camden House, completed in 1834–35.

==== Architectural influences ====
During the mid-late 1830s in England, the Gothic Revival or Medieval style of architecture became the new trend in ecclesiological architecture due to the works of the Tractarian movement and the Cambridge Camden Society.

The Oxford or Tractarian movement, named after their publication Tracts for the Times, was formed at Oxford in 1833 as a new school of churchmanship. Initially, it was an academic theological and historical movement focussed on ascertaining the rightful position and nature of the Church of England within contemporary society. It had been formed as a protest against the State and liberal pressure being directed against the Church of England at the time and was part of the Church taking stock of its purpose and mission. However, as it rapidly grew and was influenced by the Romantic Movement it morphed into a widespread affirmation of the spiritual and historical integrity and apostolic character of the Church of England. To this end it focussed on and insisted that the sacramental character of the Church be given proper reverence. The movement argued for the reinstatement of some older Christian traditions of faith and their inclusion into Anglican liturgy and theology. Overall, Tractarianism focussed on the Catholic heritage of the church and the apostolic succession, espoused that the liturgical emphasis should be on the sacraments, and was strongly opposed to any segregation in church based on social differentiation. At this time the liturgical emphasis of the Church of England was on the spoken word with the pulpit being the focus of attention and there was commonly social segregation through the use of rented pews for the wealthy and open galleries for the poor.

Tractarianism was, overall, a divisive movement, as among its supporters it generated much excitement, but at the same time it brought about resolute and firm opposition among its, often Evangelical, opponents. The nature of the movement to look towards the medieval past for inspiration led its liberal critics to label it as retrogressive and its Evangelical opponents as pro-Roman Catholic and a threat to the Protestant Church. Several of the movement's leaders seceded to the Roman Catholic Church.

The Cambridge Camden Society, later the Ecclesiological Society, was originally established to study the design and execution of ecclesiastical ornaments and buildings. This organisation was closely allied with the Tractarian movement as their goal was to provide structural expression for the liturgical and doctrinal ideals they developed. In this manner they were attempting to reintroduce structural sacramentalism to the Church of England. They eventually settled on Gothic architecture as being the most fitting for church construction and promoted these designs in Britain and across her colonies. In accordance with their goals they had very stringent standards and design requirements for church architecture and church designs they approved. The society advocated an architectural form known as "symbolic sacramentality" which was a system where the material fabric of the structure was designed to symbolise or embody some abstract meaning and through which an expression of liturgy could be articulated structurally. In essence the society aimed to develop a style that could best embody "both liturgical and architectural beauty without striving for effect".

This society aimed to implement the reformations of the Tractarian Movement through igniting a change in ecclesiological architecture in England. The favoured design or icon of the society ultimately came to be an idealised version of the 14th Century English country parish church and particularly the designs modelled after this type by its favoured architects in the 1830s and 1840s. This design stressed the proper definition and separation of the nave and chancel; the allocation of the chancel with fair proportions; the placement of the font at the entrance to the church; the addition of an exterior porch; the provision of aisles with the subsequent threefold division of the nave symbolising the holy trinity; the provision of an un-galleried nave furnished with open benches; the establishment of the chancel, sanctuary, and altar as the focus of the congregation through their elevation with steps (ideally three each); the sub-division of the chancel into a chorus cantorum and sacrarium; and the alignment of the church so that it faced east. Church design should also encourage the exclusion of the congregation from the chancel, which was only acceptable when receiving communion. A tower was not considered an essential element, but if provided should be at the west end or at the crossing of the church if it featured transepts. The most ideal Gothic style was the Decorated, dating to between 1260 and 1360 (13th-14th Centuries), and stone building materials, or less so flints, with bricks only being used as an alternative when neither was available. In this manner a church should emphasise auditory and hierarchal values in its architecture. This design was in contrast to the traditional early nineteenth century style that featured high box pews, triple-decker pulpit, and a western gallery containing harmonium and choir.

Emily Macarthur must have been fashionably up-to-date with the nascent Gothic Revival in England prompting her to ensure that the new Anglican church at Camden was constructed in the Gothic Revival style. However, due to the lack of competent architects in the colony that could design buildings in this style (Edmund Blacket arrived in the colony until 1843), Emily and James Macarthur decided to have a British architect design the church. They chose the Scottish architect John Cunningham (1799-1873) who had a connection with Emily's family or the Macarthurs. Cunningham had been trained in the Edinburgh City Works Department, but after he established his own practice he mostly worked in the Liverpool area. During his career Cunningham designed a number of churches in Gothic and Romanesque revival styles.

It is unclear at what point the decision was made to change the style of the Camden church from Classical to Gothic. It seems most likely that the decision occurred prior to the beginning of construction of the church. After their arrival back in Camden in mid-1839, Emily and James Macarthur likely convinced the other church trustees to change the style. They must have been successful by late 1839 when Hume was dropped as the architect, allowing them to send away for plans at this time. They waited until the winter of 1840 before clearing the site and constructing the bedrock foundations for the church and they must have had the plans in hand by September when construction began in earnest. When the Macarthurs sent to England for plans they must have specified that they be the same dimensions as Hume's original plans, perhaps to ensure that the budget for the church was still applicable to the Gothic Revival design. This would explain the similarity in the designs of the foundations of the two plans noted by many modern authors.

==== Construction phase ====
The construction work commenced on the church during the winter of 1840 with the levelling of the site occurring over two months. Construction of the brickwork commenced in September allowing Bishop Broughton to lay the foundation stone on 3 November 1840. During these works the Colonial Architect, Mortimer William Lewis served as supervisory architect. This was likely a result of the connection of the Macarthur family rather than Lewis fulfilling the terms of the Church Act requirements on the design and construction. Richard Basden was the local builder employed to construct the church. He supplied the 386,000 bricks used in its erection from his brickyard located on the southwest corner of the intersection of Argyle and Oxley streets. John Le Ferve acted as the carpenter and he constructed the brick spire, framing, and other timberwork. The ironbark that was used to construct the roof framing was provided by the Macarthur brothers who organised for it to be cut from the forest at Mount Hunter. The stone for the construction was sourced from Denbigh and the lime from quarries near Goulburn.

With these arrangements construction continued apace during 1841 and by April 1842 the roof, tower, and spire (including its plastering) had been completed. Unfortunately, the depression now intruded on the construction work with a lack of funds preventing the final stages of construction, such as the installation of the stained glass windows and the furnishing and flooring of the interior. This was apparently due to the folding of the bank that held the funds for the church construction. With the loss of these funds the church could not be completed until replacement funding could be found and this was difficult due to the financial straits of the Colony and the Macarthurs. It is also possible that the depression caused the delay of the promised funding from the government under the Church Act.

By the time the shell of the church had been constructed in 1842 its authentic Gothic Revival design was a new innovation in the colony and just ahead of the fashionable wave of the Gothic Revival that was to wash over the community from the mid-1840s. In particular, the decorated Gothic stone tracery of the windows and the open cusped hammer-beam roof of the church were entirely new features that subsequently became standard for Gothic Revival churches in the colony.

While construction had been underway the 2.39-hectare (5.9-acre) land grant for St John's Church had been formally granted to the Anglican Church through Bishop Broughton in May 1841 by James and William Macarthur. This land was reserved strictly for "the erection of a church or chapel for the performance of divine worship according to the rites of the United Church of England and Ireland (and) for the erection of a residence for a clergyman in holy orders, and for a burial ground according to the use of the said United Church." The grant was triangular and positioned on the south side of the town with Broughton Street forming its north boundary, the road from Broughton Street to Camden House its west boundary, and the road from Elizabeth Street to Camden House its east and south boundary. Also as part of this deed 51 square metres (550 sq ft) of land on the Camden Park Estate to the west of Camden House and south of Belgenny Farm was granted to the Church of England as the Macarthur family burial vault. Soon after the granting of this land the first burial of Thomas Budd of Narellan occurred in the cemetery in March 1843. The cemetery continued to grow from this period. No records are available about burials or grave locations for the first forty years of its existence.

During the halt in construction work, Camden continued to develop at a fast pace with it expanding to 45 households by around 1846. This development was undertaken in the shadow of the incomplete shell of St John's that promised picturesque beauty if it could be completed. Some effort appeared to have been undertaken in 1846 to completed the construction of the church when James Macarthur was reported to have ordered the stained glass windows from England. To ensure that they were of the correct size zinc templates were sent of the unique design with its tiny stained glass diamonds. Two of these windows (plus more in the tower) are still extant in the church today.

Further work to complete the church occurred by 1848 when it was suggested in the local press that the flooring had been laid and even perhaps the windows installed leaving just the interior furnishings, pulpit, seats, and chancel fittings, to be finalised. From early 1848 the church was used for marriages, according to the parish register. Temporary measures to supply furnishings and fittings appear to have been taken prior to June 1849 to allow the consecration of the church to finally be carried out. The consecration of St John's the Evangelist Anglican Church was performed by Bishop Broughton on 7 June 1849. The ceremony was attended by a congregation of around 500 people, including the Macarthur brothers, and the service was assisted by the incumbent Reverend Edward Rodgers and the clergy of the surrounding parishes (Rev. George F. Macarthur).

An account eloquently describes the church on its completion:

St John's consists of a nave, chancel and western tower and spire, all including the spire, being of brick, and at some future time to be covered with plaster. The spire is already stuccoed. The windows, which are of the "decorated " period, are exceedingly well wrought in the stone procured from the neighbourhood, which is of greyer colour and closer grain, though softer in the cutting, than the sandstone around Sydney. The flagging of the interior is the very best piece of work of the kind in the country. The roof is open, with tie-beams and spandrels. The windows are filled with fancy patterns of octagon and square glass, the former being ground, the latter coloured set in copper frames. The altar rail is carved with cinquefoil arches, on small shafts, with caps, bases and bands, in the style of the Church, and is of very effect. There is a want of porch and vestry, and the chancel is far too short.

At the time of its completion St John's was considered to be large for the population of Camden and the surrounding estates. Its size was part of the Macarthur's vision, and providing for the future, for a large and thriving settlement at Camden that honoured Anglican morals and traditions.

The original road that ran along the south border of the church lot was used extensively by the Macarthur family travelling from the town and the main south road to Camden Park House. It was closed around the time St John's was completed and consecrated.

=== The operation of St John's Camden ===
==== Clergy ====
The Anglican Parish of Camden is thought to date from the period of the enactment of the Church Act in 1836-1837 and the early plans of James and William Macarthur to establish a church at Camden. With the Macarthur family acting as patrons for the new church and endowing the stipend of the clergyman, they had the right of nomination of presentation of a parish under the provisions of the Sydney Diocesan Ordinance. However, an arrangement was made at Camden that the appointment of a minister was alternatively the decision of the Macarthur family and the Bishop. The first incumbent of the parish of Camden (in conjunction with the parish of Narellan) was the Rev. Robert Forrest who was appointed in 1843. Forrest was the first headmaster of The King's School, Parramatta from 1832 and the minister of the parish of Campbelltown from 1839 to April 1843. Forrest resided at his property Elderslie and officiated at services at the Camden Park school-room and the Narellan school-church during this period. He returned to The King's School in January 1848.

Forrest's replacement was the Rev. Edward Rogers who was appointed in early 1848 and was subsequently the minister at the time of St John's consecration in June 1849. Rogers oversaw the first registered marriage in St John's on 24 February 1848 between Robert Boyd of Camden and Augusta Sheather of Camden Park and the first marriage, following its consecration, in June 1849 between Thomas Dunk and Maria New of Camden. Rogers remained at St John's until 1858 when he was appointed to the Holy Trinity Church, in Millers Point. The first churchwardens of St John's who worked alongside Rogers were James Macarthur, William Macarthur, and George Macleay. Over the following years they were replaced by both the main tradesmen who had been involved in the church construction: John Le Ferve in 1854 and Richard Basden in 1856.

The Rev. Henry Tingcombe replaced Rogers in August 1858. He had previously been the minister of Armidale from 1846. When the rectory was completed in 1859, Tingcombe was its first resident and he remained in the parish until his resignation in October 1872. At the time of Tingcombe's resignation the arrangements for the endowment of the stipend for the parish were altered. The Macarthur family continued to contribute A£100 per annum to the stipend and provided the rectory on a nominal rent, but the local parishioners were now asked to contribute the remaining part of the stipend. With this arrangement the Bishop of Sydney granted his right of alternate nomination of the minister to the parish.

The ministers appointed from this time were:

- Rev John Fleming Moran, 1872–1891
- Rev Cecil John King, 1891–1927
- Rev Thomas Giles Paul, 1927–1943
- Rev Alfred Henry Kirk, 1944–1968
- Rev James Barry Burgess, 1968–1975
- Rev Alan Reginald Patrick, 1976–1988
- Rev Trevor William Edwards, 1989–1996
- Rev Steven John Davis, 1996–2000
- Rev Anthony Victor Galea, 2001–2021
- Rev Matthew James Stedman, 2022–present

==== Modifications ====
A critique of the completed St John's at the time of its consecration was that its chancel was too short for the preferred liturgy of the day as encouraged by the Tractarian movement. This movement required long chancels that could accommodate a choir and in which the raised altar was the focus of the congregation. This lack must have been felt by the congregation over the early years of the church's operation as in 1857 Sir William Macarthur decided to acquire plans for a chancel extension and vestry. Consequently, during his visit to Europe between 1855 and 1857 as commissioner of the NSW contingent to the Paris International Exhibition he commissioned the famous English Gothic Revival architect, Sir George Gilbert Scott to provide a design. It apparently took some time for Scott to supply these plans and it appears that in the meantime Edmund Blacket was also commissioned to provide a design. No action seems to have been taken to implement either of these designs over the following years until the death of James Macarthur in April 1867 that led to a desire by the congregation to install a fitting memorial in the church for the life of the gentleman who had been instrumental in its establishment and early management. The congregation, organised by Rev. Tingcombe, resolved to erect a memorial window, enlarge the chancel, and complete the church in honour of James Macarthur. They organised a subscription fund, "the Macarthur Memorial Fund", in which the friends and Macarthur relatives could contribute funds towards this memorial. Later in 1867, a grand stained-glass window was commissioned from Clayton and Bell. However, when it became time to implement the chancel enlargement, William and the rector, Rev. Tingcombe disagreed about which plan to use. William preferred Scott's and Tingcombe preferred Blacket's. This disagreement continued to at least 1872 before a compromise was reached and a mix of Scott's and Blacket's work was used. The separate vestry design that was implemented is thought to be Blacket's work.

Construction work on the chancel extension and vestry commenced post-1872 with the bricks being sourced from the demolition of Thompson's former steam flour mill and store that was constructed, c. 1843. Work on the extension was completed in 1874, and on 13 June 1875 the chancel extension with its window memorial to James Macarthur was finally opened by the Lord Bishop of Sydney.

Soon after the completion of St John's the need was identified for improved educational facilities in the budding township of Camden. Consequently, in 1850 a denominational school was founded on the eastern corner of the church lot, adjacent the intersection of Hill and Broughton streets. Funding was granted from the Denominational School Board for the school and the trustees of the local board, George Macleay, Rev. Edward Rodgers, and John Oxley sought about seeing to its construction. The foundation stone was laid by Bishop Broughton on 1 July 1850, and tenders for the construction were called in February 1851. The neat brick school remained in use until it was closed in 1879 after the establishment of the Camden Public School. The building was retained by the church for the next 25 years before its worsening condition prompted the parish to sell it and 0.43 hectares (1.1 acres) of surrounding land in December 1906. Both the condition of the building and the need to raise funds to construct a new Church Hall appear to have played a part in prompting the sale of this corner of the original 1841 land grant for the church.

The need for a rectory at St John's was alleviated in 1859 with the construction of a brick rectory with stables and coach house. James and William Macarthur donated the A£1,000 for the construction of these building on lands belonging to the Camden Park Estate. As Rev. Tingcombe was the Rector of the church at this time and he became the first occupant of the new rectory it has been speculated that Blacket was the architect for this building. This is because these gentlemen are known to have been associates and in later times were involved in the design of the chancel extension. The rectory consisted of a substantial Georgian style two-storey brick building with six-pane windows and shutters, as well as a front verandah. The Macarthurs appear to have seen to the upkeep of the rectory throughout the remainder of the nineteenth century and continued to manage the surrounding land as part of the estate. It appears that they permitted some of the surrounding land to be used for glebe purposes by the rectors.

In 1861 a new organ, specially constructed by Bates and Sons of Ludgate Hill, London, was presented to the church on the behalf of Emily Macarthur (who was in London at the time) to replace an older harmonium that was not of the best quality. Theodore Charles Bates was a well-known London builder of small finger and barrel organs. He operated from about 1812 to 1864 on his own, in partnership with others, and in partnerships with his son. A new gallery was constructed at the west end of St John's in 1861 to accommodate this new organ. This gallery was designed by Blacket and the organ was fitted by 21 July 1861.

Elizabeth Macarthur (1840–1911), the only daughter of James and Emily Macarthur, married Commander R. N. Arthur Onslow (1833–1882) at St John's on 21 January 1867. Elizabeth, and to a lesser degree her husband, were strong patrons of the church throughout her life and she donated many fixtures to improve the church facilities. The early 1880s witnessed the dying of several older members of the Macarthur family. Emily died in 1880 and Arthur Onslow in early 1882 leaving Elizabeth to raise their six surviving children. William Macarthur died on 29 October 1882 and his funeral service was held at St John's before he was interred at the family vault on the Camden Park Estate. As he had never married he left the estate to his niece Elizabeth Macarthur-Onslow. Elizabeth had been managing the estate since the late 1870s due to William's failing health. Throughout the remainder of the nineteenth century and into the next Elizabeth Macarthur-Onslow and her children were strong friends and patrons of the church and its parish. In 1897 Elizabeth Elizabeth Macarthur-Onslow donated the turret clock and peal of eight ringing bells for the church tower to commemorate Queen Victoria's diamond Jubilee. The bells were dedicated to different members of the Macarthur family.

By the late nineteenth century the church cemetery was nearing capacity and a new general cemetery at Cawdor was dedicated in 1898 to serve the community. The church cemetery was soon closed except for those who had purchased the right to burial or family vaults.

Plans to construct the first Church Hall were underway in 1905 to provide the parish with improved facilities after the deterioration of the old denominational school building. This hall was designed by Sulman and Power in the Federation Gothic style and the plans were approved by the Diocesan Building Surveyor, Cyril Blacket (a son of Edmund Blacket) in February 1906. Sir John Sulman is renown as an important late-nineteenth and early twentieth century Australian architect. The design consisted of a 15-by-9-metre (50 by 30 ft) hall with platform and two 5-by-8-metre (15 by 25 ft) retiring rooms at the south end and 3-by-3-metre (10 by 9 ft) porch at the front. The Bishop of Goulburn laid the foundation stone for the hall on 29 July and construction commenced soon after. Funding came from three main sources: the Church Loan Fund, the Camden Park Estate, and other subscriptions and donations. The funds from the sale of the denomination school when it proceeded after 1906 was reportedly used to pay back the loan for the construction.

An Ordinance of August 1906 approved the sale of 0.43 hectares (1.1 acres) of the original 1841 grant to the Anglican Church for the establishment of St John's. This reduced the grant area to the 1.95 hectares (4.8 acres) which is extant today. The rationale for the sale of this land was the area was surplus to the needs of the church and the funds from the sale were necessary for the funding of the new hall which was already under construction. Elizabeth Macarthur-Onslow consented to the sale and the auction took place in December 1906 and the land was sold for A£300 to Mr F. C. Whiteman. The land was sold again in 1925, and in 1926, and a Masonic Lodge was built on the site, currently extant.

In the early 20th century when the Parish was in some financial trouble due to a decrease in the congregation and the changing nature of the surrounding area (from agriculture to dairy farming) the Macarthur-Onslow family came to its assistance through the granting of additional land. In May 1905, George Macleay Macarthur-Onslow, a church warden and active member of the congregation, donated the rectory to the Camden Parish on behalf of the Directors of the Camden Park Estate Limited, at the annual vestry meeting of St John's parish. The parish now had its own proper rectory, however, it required that the parish outlay funds for the upkeep of the property. It seemed that prior to this date, Camden Park Estate Limited paid for repairs, renovations, and other maintenance. Consequently, in November 1905 a 1.42-hectare (3.5-acre) property encompassing the rectory was transferred from the Camden Park Estate to the Anglican Church Property Trust.

In August 1910 the Camden Park Estate donated a further two pieces of land to the Parish: a 5.16-hectare (12.8-acre) lot equal in width to the rectory and lot and extending from its south side to the Nepean River, and a 1.07-hectare (2.6-acre) lot, the modern-day horse paddock between the rectory and church lots. The Camden Park Estate also offered for purchase the strip of land between the rectory and Mr Furner's paddock for A£200. It appears that the parish didn't accept this offer at the time. In September 1911, the two parcels of donated land were transferred from the Camden Park Estate to the Church of England Property Trust.

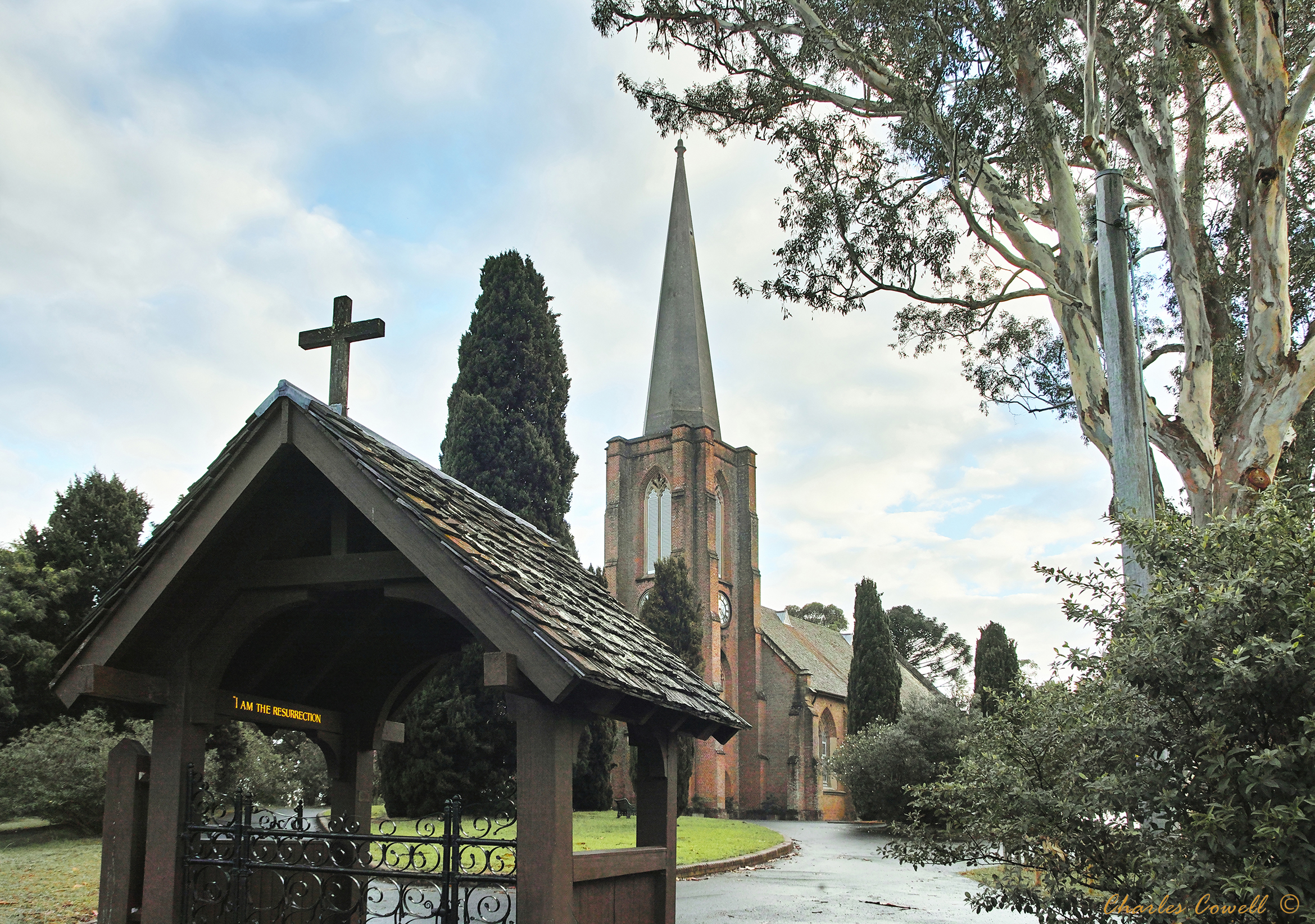
The main entrance to the church taken from Menangle Road with the lych gate in the foreground, pictured in 2017.

Elizabeth Macarthur-Onslow died while in England in August 1911. The following year, a memorial lych gate, currently extant, was installed in her honour on the church grounds. The Camden Park Estate had been formed into a company a few years previously and her sons and daughters had been strongly associated with its running since they reached their majorities. Rosa Sibella (1871-1943), who had cared for her mother for some time, took over Camden Park House and the headship of the family. She was a good friend and patron of St John's over her lifetime and a leader in church and charity affairs. Captain George Onslow was strongly connected with civic and social life in Camden in this period and was a treasurer of the parish council for some time, strongly connected with the Parish and St John's throughout his life. Upon his death in 1937 a memorial window depicting war and peace was installed in the nave.

In July 1929, a 3.08-hectare (7.6-acre) strip of land to the south of the rectory from Menangle Road to the Nepean River was transferred from the Camden Park Estate to the Church of England Property Trust. This lot may encompass the land that the Camden Park Estate had previously offered to the Parish for A£200 in 1910. The land the Parish now owned facing Menangle Road to the south of the rectory was subdivided into building blocks and sold in 1932.

In 1968 the remaining 8 hectares (20 acres) of glebe land located between the rectory and the Nepean River, as well as an additional 2 hectares (5 acres) purchased by the parish, was subdivided and sold as a residential estate. This comprised 54 buildings lots around Forrest Crescent and Tingcombe Place, and Paul Place - streets named after the early ministers of the parish. Part of the original rectory lot was also subdivided at this time. The 5 hectares (12 acres) of flood prone land closest to the Nepean River was donated to Camden Council and became the Kings Bush reserve. Today it is known as the Chellaston Street Reserve. The funds raised through this land sale were used to meet the operation costs of the parish and to fund the construction of a new church hall.

The final building constructed in the church precinct was the second Church Hall. It was designed by the architects Martin and King and originally also included a kindergarten that has never been constructed due to a lack of funding. The foundation stone for this hall was set by Brigadier Richard Quentin Macarthur-Stanham (1921-2008) of Camden Park House on 24 September 1972. It was opened and dedicated on 25 March 1973 by the Archbishop of Sydney Most Rev. Marcus Loane.

== Description ==
The following description has been sourced and summarised primarily from the Conservation Management Plan prepared for St John's Anglican Church Precinct, that provides a comprehensive physical description of the precinct's major elements and its wider landscape context.

=== St John's Anglican Church Precinct ===
The St John's Anglican Church Precinct comprises the church, rectory, cemetery, two church halls and grounds that provide a rural landscaped environment to the group. The precinct is situated on St John's Hill, which is 134 metres above sea level and overlooks the township of Camden. St John's Anglican Church and its precinct was created to be the picturesque focus of the Camden region and today, it is one of the most complete parish church groups in NSW.

The precinct comprises three modern lots: the church lot comprising the remainder of the original 1841 land grant from the Macarthur family; the rectory lot comprising the remainder of the land donated to the parish from the Camden Park Estate in 1906; and the horse paddock lot that was donated to the parish from the Camden Park Estate in 1911. It is bordered on its east side by Menangle Road, by Broughton Street on its north side, Forrest Crescent on its south side, and the Alpha Road (Warner Estate) residential development on its west side.

The church lot features St John's Church, the two church halls, the cemetery, and churchyard. The rectory lot comprises the rectory, its associated stables, and grounds. The horse paddock lot between them is a rolling grassed open space that was formerly glebe land for the rector. It forms an important setting that accentuates the rural and nineteenth century characters of the church and churchyard and rectory and grounds.

=== St John's Anglican Church ===
St John's Anglican Church is a town church featuring a large nave, chancel (extended in 1872–1874), vestry (added 1872–1874), and west tower with brick spire. It is considered to be the first archaeologically correct Gothic Revival church constructed in the Colony of NSW since it was mostly complete by 1843. It considerably differs from earlier churches in its competent and authentic decorated gothic design and its internal layout with the pulpit and prayer desk in the east end and the table in the chancel. This was considerably different from the previous centralised plans used in the colony (box-like). The hammer beam roof trusses with their carved tracery and mullioned windows with their stone tracery were authentic English decorated style detailing that were new to the Colony at the time. The spire and its features, engaged buttresses, correct moulding, and finial, were correct to new Victorian Gothic Revival and likewise new features to the Colony. At the time of its completion the building was of a superior quality with a high standard of craftsmanship in its fittings. Its font communion rail, windows, and the enormous stone flagged floor of the nave are all of particularly fine craftsmanship.

Today the church remains complete with its tower, spire, stained glass, and all its furniture all being in a good condition. The bare brick finish of the building imparts it with a rustic charm that, to the modern eye, intensifies its romantic qualities.

==== Church exterior ====
- Roof: Terracotta shingles (c. 1929); copper gutters and downpipes (1972). The roof was originally split timber shingles which were replaced in 1872 and again in 1901. The present terracotta shingle roof was installed in 1929. A series of four gablets (two per side of the gable) were also constructed, likely during one of these re-roofing exercises. There was originally a stone cross atop of the channel arch gable which was dislodged in a severe storm in 1972.
- Spire: Render on brick. The spire was rendered from the time of the completion of the church. This render was removed in 1973 and a new render applied. A ventilation opening to the south was made near the top of the spire in 1995.
- Tower: Brick, buttressed with brick copings, stone coping at top - original. The brick tower has never been rendered. Historical photographs show wooden louvres fitted to the upper windows of the tower.
- Walls: brick, presented as face. The bricks were burnt locally and a quality in the Camden clay resulted in a multiplicity of colours (National Trust visit, 23/10/01 – notes by Lucas, C.). The lower courses of the brick walls are currently suffering from rising damp which will require maintenance works in the near future.
- Sills: Cement, re-rendered to approximately original detail c. 1995.
- Windows: Stone frames and mullions – original. Rendered reveals c. 1973. The sandstone for the frames and mullions was procured locally and is greyer, closer in grain and softer in cutting than Sydney sandstone. Early photographs indicate that the window reveals were rendered. This render was removed in 1973 and new render applied. To improve ventilation through the church, strips were cut in the base of the timber window frames in 1899.
- Base: brick – original.
- Doors: Timber Gothic style, original cedar; finish: painted external; wood grained oak painted internal.

===== Clock and bells =====
Early photographs indicate that the openings for insertion of a clock face in the tower were part of the original building. The extant turret clock and peal of eight ringing bells were erected in June 1897 (Queen Victoria's Diamond Jubilee). They were ordered from England in 1896 by Mrs Elizabeth Macarthur-Onslow. The clock is by Gillett and Johnson of Croydon, London, and the bells are by Meares and Stainbanks of Whitechapel, London. Installation of the clock was undertaken by F. W. Syer of North Sydney, and the bells were hung by J. D. Rankin of Camden, all under the supervision of Sulman and Power, architects. The clock was officially started by J. K. Chisholm on 21 June 1897. In c. 1950, electric motors replaced the manual winding mechanism for the striking of the bells. The original church bell was installed in 1859. It was relocated to St James' Menangle at the time of the installation of the present peal of bells.

The clock mechanism consists of three chains of wheels (one drives the clock, the others the striking and chiming apparatus) driven by three weights. The three dials are 6 feet (2 m) in diameter. The chimes are of the "Westminster" pattern. Of the eight bells, six are inscribed with the names of members of Mrs Elizabeth Macarthur-Onslow's family in the ascending order of weight:

1. John and Elizabeth Macarthur, at 253 kilograms (558 lb)
2. Children of John and Elizabeth Macarthur, at 269 kilograms (593 lb)
3. James and Emily Macarthur, at 300 kilograms (660 lb)
4. Arthur Pooley and Rosa Onslow, at 361 kilograms (796 lb)
5. Arthur Onslow, at 408 kilograms (899 lb)
6. Children of Arthur and Elizabeth Onslow, at 432 kilograms (952 lb)
7. 539 kilograms (1,188 lb)
8. 710 kilograms (1,570 lb)

The tenor bell is inscribed with the doxology.

The clock and striking mechanism, bell hammers and clappers were restored c. 2004. They have been regularly serviced over the recent past, but are today in need of minor works as they are off time.

==== Church interior ====
===== Nave =====
- Ceiling: Original beaded sarking boards, beaded rafters, timber hammer beam truss and truss purlins and timber work to four roof vents in a quatrefoil pattern
- Cornice: Original moulded timbe
- Walls: Original lime plaster, painted and grained paintwork to window mullions. Existing colour scheme in plain cream dates from the 1970s. The church interior was painted in 2010.
- Skirting:
  - North – No skirting except for 4 metres (13 ft) approximately at east end
  - East – Rendered skirting 410 millimetres (16 in) high
  - South – At the east end approximately 4 metres (13 ft), 410 millimetres (16 in), rendered
  - West – 300-millimetre (12 in) rendered, original
- Floor: Stone 460-by-460-millimetre (18 in × 18 in) slabs laid on the diagonal. Margin of 305 millimetres (12.0 in) at the east end. Three stone steps with chamfered nosings lead into the chancel. The diagonal paving gives way to two squared areas on either side of a central aisle, possibly related to the font. Fixing points are evident for fixtures at the east end. William Buchan laid the original floor flagging (and similarly the window tracery and font).

====== Nave fittings ======
- Pews and choir stalls: The polished cedar pews and stalls are of three generations. The first pews were provided by Bishop Broughton. The replacement (extant) seats were obtained at various times. Removable seat and back upholstery added to the main central block of pews in 2000.
- Pulpit: Cedar pulpit, raised on five steps – original. The pulpit was a bequest from Dr Anderson in 1858. It was made by Mr Poulton, to a design by W. Voss.
- Prayer desk: Cedar – Edwardian. The prayer or reader's desk was presented in 1905 by the ladies of the parish.
- Lectern: Carved Burmese teak wood, date of manufacture unknown. The eagle bible lectern was purchased in London in 1894 by Mrs Macarthur-Onslow.
- Font: Stone – original; timber front cover – "In memory of Amy Pinkerton" (c. 1973). The font was completed by William Buchan by the time of the consecration. The stone was quarried at the Rev. Thomas Hassall's Denbigh estate. The location of the font has changed over time, being placed centrally under the organ gallery in 1895 and in 2003 placed next to the chancel arch.

====== Windows ======
- South side, first (and second) windows: Examples of the original coloured glass windows (another is in the tower), specially ordered in 1846 by James Macarthur who had sent zinc templates to England.
- South side, third window: A memorial to the fifth rector of the church, Rev C. J. King, and his twin brother, and noted pioneer New Guinea missionary, Rev. Copland King. The windows were installed in c. 1930 and were made by Alfred Handel of Sydney. The windows depict Jesus and the disciples and Jesus with children of all nations.
- South side, fourth window: This is a memorial commemorating the Great War of 1914-1918 given by the local parishioners. Alfred Handel of Sydney made the window, which depicts St Mark and St George.
- South side, fifth window: Situated near the pulpit, this is a memorial by public subscription to the third rector of the church, Rev. Henry Tingcombe (d.1879). The English-made window depicts St James (the traveller) and St John (the healer).
- North side, sixth window: This is a memorial by public subscription to the Hon. Captain Arthur Onslow, R.N. MLC (d.1882). The Whitefriars London-made window depicts Jesus with his disciples on the sea of Galilee.
- North side, seventh window: This is a memorial to Elizabeth Macarthur-Onslow (d. 1911) given in 1912 by her family. The English-made window depicts Jesus with his disciples and mothers with their children.
- North side, eighth window: This is a memorial to Brigadier-General George Macleay Macarthur-Onslow, given in 1931 by his family. The window depicts a soldier dedicating his life to Jesus and spiritual triumphs.
- North side, ninth window: This is a memorial to John William and Alice Wilson Clinton given c. 1970 and made by Stephen Moor of Sydney. The window depicts the miracle of Jesus feeding the five thousand.
- North side, tenth window: This is a memorial to Bertha Victoria Brien, an organist and Sunday school teacher with 30 years' service to the church, given in 1961 by her husband and made by Stephen Little of Sydney. The window depicts St Cecilia with an organ and St Mary with the infant Jesus.
- Organ: A three manual Johannus electric organ was installed in 1987 at the north side of the channel/nave with loud speakers located high at gable level on each side of the chancel arch.
- Artificial lighting: Eight large pendant light fittings at the hammer beam (c. 1932).

The original interior lighting of the church was by candles placed along the top rail of the pew backs. In 1859, 34 kerosene lamps were installed. In c.1910 an acetylene gas system was installed, which was subsequently connected to a town gas supply. In 1932 mains supply electricity was installed in the town with connections made to the church.

Other: Eight wall mounted infrared electric radiators (1990).

Chancel interior

- Ceiling: Original timber beaded sarking boards; chamfered purlins, raised knee trusses supported on sandstone bosses
- Walls: Render, unset, lined out in ashlar c. 1870s. The church interior was painted in 2010
- Skirting: Rendered – original
- Floor: Cement, lined out in 500 sq. diagonal lines with margin, date unknown. Two steps to the table, both covered by carpet. A marble margin can be seen on the north and south side.

Chancel fittings

- Table: In 1917 the present cedar table replaced the original 1848 altar table (location now unknown). A front piece was added to commemorate 25 years in charge of St John's Parish by Rev C. J. King in March 1916. The panel at the bottom in the middle of the front is a recent plywood addition
- Reredos: The original 1848 reredos was remodelled by architects Wilson Neave & Berry and presented by the parishioners in 1916, marking 25 years of Rev. C. J. King's ministry. The eastern end is cedar panelled; given c.1970 in memory of Warwick Frank Hands, replacing earlier heavy curtains
- Communion rail: Cedar - original. The communion rails with carved Gothic arches were partly funded by Bishop Broughton and were installed shortly after the consecration
- President's Chairs: Pair of chairs, Gothic style, Australia made, cedar - original. Installed at time of chancel extension in 1874
- Credence stand: Cedar with grapevines - date unknown
- Hall chairs: Pair; cedar, mid-Victorian

Windows

- East window: The stone frame of this window, the largest in the church, dates from the completion of the church in the 1840s. It was re-installed in 1874 when the chancel was extended. The present stained glass was commissioned and installed in 1869 (or 1872–4) as a memorial to James Macarthur (d. 1867) by parishioners and friends, and was made by Clayton and Bell of England. The window depicts the Transformation.
- Four lancet windows: A gift of Sir George Macleay of Brownlow Hill, and installed at the time of the completion of the chancel in 1874. The windows depict the Evangelists and their symbols - St Matthew with the casket; St Mark with the lion; St Luke with the bull; and St John with the eagle.

Vestry interior

- Ceiling: Timber beaded sarking boards – original
- Rafters: Timber beaded – original
- Windows: Cedar framed with small frosted glass panes – some original
- External door: Cedar replacement (c. 1995); copy of damaged original
- Walls: Cement, lined out in ashlar – original
- Floor: Cement, date unknown

Vestry fittings

- None original

===== Tablets and memorial fittings =====
The tablets in the church commemorate:

- 1874: Brass Plate Sir George Macleay lancet windows (chancel)
- 1877: Marble Plate Oliver Hinde, his wife and children (nave)
- 1897: Brass Plate James & Emily Macarthur, Sir William Macarthur, Arthur Alexander Walton Onslow RN. Peal of bells and clock (entrance)
- 1907: Brass Plate Reggie Gardener, Chorister (vestry)
- 1915: Brass Plate Lance Corporal Eric Lyndon Lowe (WWI) (chancel)
- 1932: Bronze Plaque Brigadier-General George Macleay Macarthur-Onslow (nave)
- 1932: Brass Plate Electric Lighting (entrance)
- 1940's: Chromium Plate: Edward Palmer, died 1875 (chancel)
- 1940's: Chromium Plate: Edward Palmer, his son (no date) (chancel)
- 1949: Copper Plate: Emma Rapley. Electric winding of clock chimes (entrance)
- 1969: Bronze Plate: Lawrence Arthur Rideout. Pipe Organ restoration (nave)
- 1988: Bronze Plaque: Bicentennial window restoration (entrance)
- 1999: Bronze Plaque 150th Anniversary of Consecration (entrance)
- 2001: Bronze Plaque Clock & bells restoration (entrance)

===== Organ loft and choir gallery – interior =====
Organ loft: Installed in 1861. The organ loft and choir gallery were constructed at the west end of the nave. The design for this alteration was prepared by Edmund T. Blacket. The builder was John Le Fevre (a former church warden). The cost was met by public subscription. Stair to loft: Tasmanian oak stairs (1995). Originally access to the gallery was by stairs situated in the entrance area under the tower. This arrangement was removed in 1995 and new access stairs were installed within the nave to the design of architect R. Y. Stringer. Screen doors: Entry to nave; pair of Tasmanian oak glass panelled doors (1995).

Organ loft – fittings

Organ: The organ is labelled "Bates and Son, organ builders Ludgate Hill London". The organ is housed in a timber case in the Gothic style, of gabled towers with pinnacles, and contains 17 false gilded pipes arranged 5–7–5. It has eight ranks to the manual and one rank to the foot pedals.

The original harmonium was installed in 1850 on a platform which also accommodated the choir; located at the west end of the nave. The extant pipe organ was either built or rebuilt (Rev C. J. King in 1919 stated that it was second hand) by the London firm of T.C. Bates & Son, Organ Builders, 6 Ludgate Hill, London. The organ was selected by Dr E. J. Hopkins, organist of Temple Church, London, for Emily Macarthur. The purchase price was A£300. Theodore Charles Bates was a builder of small finger and barrel organs from 1812 through to 1864. In alterations, possibly undertaken early in this century, the Bourdon pipes were added for the pedals and the range reduced. This work was by organ builder, Charles Richardson. Further alterations were made in 1969 by the organ builder Arthur Jones.

Extensive restoration was commenced in 2000. Between 2002 and 2007 the organ was completely rebuilt by M. Da Costa master organ builder of Sydney who extended the keyboard compass back to the original G below bottom C with additional pipes.

=== Rectory and stables ===
The rectory of St John's, dating from c. 1859, is a thorough architectural essay in strict Georgian symmetry and discipline. Its plan form is four square about a wide hall. This is repeated for the first floor. The window and door openings are set out to give symmetrical elevations and internally doors face each other across the halls. The elevations are executed in fine face brick laid in true English bond. Large double-hung windows with divided sashes and shutters are identical throughout the house. The windows are original, with double-hung sashes, each divided into a six panes, in a timber-box frame with a pair of louvred timber shutters. The quality and details of the house are refined but simple. All except two of the chimney pieces have been removed. The surviving joinery, cornices and staircase are well built and finely executed examples of their period.

The original verandah on the front of the building (its east side) was removed in the mid-1970s and replaced with a smaller portico. This portico was later removed and the verandah recreated in 2003. A family room was added to the rectory sometime between 2004 and 2010.

Internally, the rectory consists of a main and rear hall, sitting room, study, dining room, bedroom, sunroom, passage, service room, kitchen, laundry and lavatory on the first floor, and stair hall, four further bedrooms and a dressing room.

The stables are constructed in brick and originally provided for horse stabling, carriage and harness storage with feed loft. The building was reduced in length to enable access to church land subdivision in 1968 and for the creation of Forrest Crescent.

=== Church hall (1906) ===
The Federation Gothic church hall is entirely as built in 1906 except for a partition one bay east of the original stage proscenium. The roof is asbestos cement shingles with a perforated terracotta roof ridging and weatherboarding to the gable ends. The bell and its associated detail is intact. The hall has timber-framed doors and windows; the walls are face brick; the interior walls are painted print; the floors are timber and the ceiling is timber planked with exposed compound steel and timber trusses.

Drainage works were undertaken to overcome structural cracking as some point between 2004 and 2010.

The site also contains a modern second church hall, dating from 1973, which was deemed not to be of heritage significance.

=== Church Precinct Grounds ===
==== Plantings ====
There are a group of exotic and native trees planted to the east and south of the church and within the terraced platforms of the cemetery. These trees are visible in photographs from the 1860s onwards:

- Mature kurrajongs (Brachychiton populenus) planted to the west of the 1973 church hall.
- Clusters of conifers (Cupressus funebris and Cupressus sempervirens) planted throughout the grounds, also visible in photographs from the 1860s.
- Mature bunyas (Acaucaria bidwilii) planted throughout the grounds providing a reference point within the surrounding landscape. Particularly large and locally prominent examples are situated to the east of the rectory.
- Two large palms (Jubaca chilensis) planted to the east of the rectory. Many of the now mature specimens probably came from William Macarthur's nursery at Camden Park.

Other mature trees immediately around the church include Mediterranean cypress (Cupressus sempervirens), forest red gum (Eucalyptus tereticornis), kurrajong (Brachychiton populneum), Chinese juniper (Juniperus chinensis), oleanders (Nerium oleander cv.s), funeral cypresses (Chamaecyparis funebris), Photinia glabra, Chinese elm (Ulmus chinensis), and brown pine (Podocarpus elatus).

==== Memorials ====
There are several memorials to benefactors within the precinct:

- Lych gate: The lych gate at the entry to the church grounds from Menangle Road was erected in 1912 as a memorial to Mrs Elizabeth Macarthur-Onslow and restored in 2003.
- John Street entry: The flight of brick built steps and iron railings leading up from John Street were erected in 1935. The cost of this work was donated by General James William Macarthur-Onslow. The electric light and copper fitting here is a memorial to Mr and Mrs James Waterworth.
- Boundary fencing: Boundary fencing of pipe railing and other gates were erected in 1935. The cost of this work was donated by Mrs Faithful Anderson.
- Sundial: The sundial was donated in 1953 by Mrs Violet Macarthur-Onslow, the wife of George Macleay Macarthur-Onslow. The sundial had been at the Riley's Glenmore estate at Mulgoa since 1861, and at her property, Murrandah, Camden, since 1922. It was restored in 1996.
- Columbarium: The Memorial Garden / Columbarium was erected in 1964 as a memorial to William Angilley. The Columbarium walls were further extended in 1986 in memory of Mark Kernahan and again in 1994.

==== Other features ====
The major features, other than buildings, within the precinct are:

- Road formation: Situated to the east and south of the cemetery are the remains of a road formation, which is likely to be the road shown in nineteenth century maps of the area and photographs of the church. The road evidently provided an early route to Camden Park House.
- Horse paddock: The sloping areas of land situated between the rectory and church is shown in nineteenth century photographs as cleared and open. It was separated from the church and cemetery by a substantial four rail fence. It was purchased by or donated to the church in 1911.
- Tennis courts platform: Located to the west of the 1906 church hall is a platform which evidently is the remains of former tennis courts. This photograph is visible on 1940s photographs of the precinct.
- Undulating topography: The church grounds possess an undulating topography framed by the three hills upon which the rectory, church and Masonic hall (site of former school) are sited.
- Old path from the church hall to the church: The formation of the old path from the church hall of 1906 (and presumably before that from the old school) to the church is evident in a number of nineteenth-century photographs and cl940 aerial photograph.
- Road from the lych gate to the church: The present-day road from the lych gate to the church closely approximates the same shown in early twentieth century photographs although the surface treatment is different.
- Road from front of the rectory and leading to the stables: There are a number of old road formations and gates associated with the rectory and associated stables. The timber gate posts to the stables are comparable in detail to a gate to the church on Broughton Street shown in an early twentieth-century photograph.
- Horse paddock and Cemetery gate: These are four nineteenth-century timber gate posts with cast irons caps.

=== Cemetery ===
The modern cemetery covers an area of around zero point four zero hectares (one acre) across approximately six terraces ranged across the southern slopes of the church lot. It holds approximately 1600 grave sites and is scattered with and surrounding by various tree plantings. Since 1977 there has been an ongoing program of maintenance which ensures that the sites is not overgrown by vegetation. Between 1977 and 1987 a survey of the cemetery was undertaken that recorded all the grave sites. Further work has been undertaken in 1995 by a Land Environment Action Program team and in 1999 by a work for the dole program. Today sections of the cemetery are in poor condition and require maintenance, rebuilding, and interpretation.

=== Regional landscape context ===
St John's Anglican Church Precinct is an exemplary demonstration of the regional use of landscape design. St John's Anglican Church, with its tower and spire, dominates and commands the Camden landscape on its high prominence (St John's Hill) in the middle of what is a low-lying flood plain. Its tower and spire symbolically reach for heaven and point the way for the minds and souls of the local community. The church tower and spire, as well as other elements of the church precinct such as the rectory, are visible from many locations in the local landscape from Cobbitty to the north, Narellan in the east, Cawdor in the south, and Grasmere and Bickley Vale to the west. More distant views are also available of the church in the greater region as well. This effect on the local landscape is the result of a deliberate landscape design by the Macarthur family that was aimed both at creating picturesque vistas that reminded them of an English countryside, and reinforcing the social order the Macarthurs, as part of the ruling class, wished to uphold. St John's extraordinary command of the regional landscape ensures that it is visible from all the major roads, high points, and the seats of several of the major local estates. This command is expressed through 16 significant views and vistas in the regional landscape that is identified in the conservation management plan.

The most important of these many vistas are the two deliberately planned by the Macarthur family with the assistance of Sir Thomas Mitchell:

1. The vista from the front carriageway loop of Camden Park House to St John's in the distance. Today the garden and plantings around the front of the house have been purposefully managed and arranged so that a break exists in the surrounding tree line (across the croquet lawn) which captures the picturesque vista to St John's across the landscape of the former estate. In this vista, St John's spire sits in front of the Blue Mountains range between the two distinctive peaks of Mount Hay and Mount Banks. This vista has earned the church the local quip "built to the glory of God and to improve the views of the Macarthurs". It is complemented by one of Camden Park House from the southern main entrance of St John's (however, this is no longer visible due to tree growth near the church). Further evidence of the deliberate planning of this vista is the fact that it aligns with the cross-axis of the township of Camden.
2. The vista of St John's looking south and upwards along John's Street in Camden. This vista was deliberately planned by Sir Thomas Mitchell in his design for the township to demonstrate the moral authority and commanding presence of God, and the Anglican Church, over the hearts and souls of the community.

=== Condition ===
As at 20 September 2017, St John's the Evanglist Anglican church was in good condition and retains all its original fabric. It is well maintained by the Camden Parish and features only small sympathetic modifications to assist in the modern running of the building. Some elements of the building require conservation and maintenance works such as the clock and bells, roof, and walls (rising damp). The churchyard and grounds are well maintained and in good condition. The cemetery is well maintained but requires some conservation works to its older portions to prevent further subsidence of some graves and memorials. The rectory is in a fair-good condition but requires some maintenance works, especially to its roof. The church hall is in fair condition, but has some issues with structural cracking due to subsidence. The church precinct has good integrity and intactness.

Organ: The pipes and mechanical action have been modified in places and added to over time, however the organ remains a substantially intact instrumental and is played regularly.

== Heritage listing ==
As at 6 November 2007, St John's Anglican Church Precinct was of state heritage significance as a group of ecclesiastical buildings set in a beautiful landscape setting consisting of mature and exotic tree plantings and open grassed slopes. The precinct's centre and focal point is St John's the Evangelist Anglican Church which is of state heritage significance as the first Gothic Revival church constructed in NSW that was correct in its medieval detail ('archaeologically correct'). This status, along with its strong connection to the 1836 Church Act, renders it an important early forerunner of the Gothic Revival movement which was to dominate ecclesiastical architecture in the Colony throughout the remainder of the nineteenth century. The church, and especially its tower and spire, is aesthetically significant to NSW as part of the regional Camden landscape created by the Macarthur family. St John's as an important regional landmark is a significant element in the picturesque landscape planning used to create the Camden Park Estate, the seat of the Macarthur family. As part of a triumvirate of significant points in the landscape, along with Camden Park House and the township of Camden, it also expresses the power structures the Macarthur family wished to instil in the local community they were creating in the early nineteenth century. This regional landscape design is of state heritage significance as an important example of early-mid nineteenth century landscape planning.

The entire church precinct has an important historical association with the Macarthur family of Camden. Each of the precinct allotments was donated to the Anglican Church by the Macarthurs and the family funded the construction of most of the buildings and patronised the operation of the church throughout the nineteenth and early twentieth centuries. Ultimately, St John's Anglican church precinct is a remarkable, picturesquely located, and historic place of Anglican worship in a state context.

St John's Anglican Church Precinct was listed on the New South Wales State Heritage Register on 24 August 2018 having satisfied the following criteria.

The place is important in demonstrating the course, or pattern, of cultural or natural history in New South Wales.

St John the Evangelist Anglican Church has historical significance at a state level as the first archaeologically correct Gothic Revival Church constructed in the colony of NSW and Australia as the Gothic Revival movement gained momentum in the early 1840s. The church thus has an important place in this movement that was to dominate ecclesiastical architecture in the colony throughout the remainder of the nineteenth century. The Gothic Revival movement was reflective of deep-running change in the Anglican Church during this period. St John's Anglican Church demonstrates the spread of these ideas to the Colony, following the trends of ecclesiastical architecture in Britain.

St John's Anglican Church is of historical significance at a state level due to its strong connection with the 1836 Church Act. This piece of legislation confirmed the colony as a religiously plural society and ushered in an unprecedented period of church building. St John's is one of the earliest extant churches built under this act. It is an important member of this group of early Church Act churches due to its Gothic Revival design, fine construction, picturesque location, and prominent part in wider regional landscape planning that renders it a remarkable place of worship.

The place has a strong or special association with a person, or group of persons, of importance of cultural or natural history of New South Wales's history.

St John's Anglican Church Precinct has an association of state significance with the Macarthur family. The Macarthurs have played significant roles in politics, social life, philanthropy, military life, and the development of wool growing, agriculture, horticulture, viticulture, and dairying in the colony of NSW. They are especially well remembered as the gentry that developed the Camden area as it is today with its wide open rural landscape and proud historic nature. The Macarthur family are directly responsible for the establishment of St John's and its associated church precinct as they donated the land on which it sits and provided much of the funding that saw the church, rectory, and many of the other features constructed. Many elements of the church precinct and furnishings of the church were also donated by, or are memorials to, members of the Macarthur family. In this manner, the church precinct and its regional landscape setting is a fitting memorial to the achievements of the Macarthur family in the development of the Camden region and the Colony of NSW.

Among the generations of the Macarthur family that have been custodians of the Camden Park Estate there are several members who were closely involved with the establishment and running of the church precinct. The successful pastoralist and conservative politician James (1798–1867); his wife Emily (1806–1880); and the prominent pastoralist, horticulturalist, vintner, and benefactor of public institutions Sir William Macarthur (1800–82) were intimately involved in the establishment and construction of St John's and the early portions of its precinct during the mid-nineteenth century. Their successors to the Camden Park Estate, the philanthropist and dairy farmer Elizabeth (1840–1911) and naval officer and politician Commander R. N. Arthur Macarthur-Onslow (1833–1882), were also strongly involved in the further running and development of the church and precinct during the late nineteenth and early twentieth century. Their children the charity and church worker Rosa Sibella (1871–1943) and the soldier and grazier Brigadier-General George Macleay (1875–1931) were also involved in the same manner during the early to mid-twentieth century. The association between the family and the church precinct continued until at least 1972 when Brigadier Richard Quentin Macarthur-Stanham (1921–2008) laid the foundation stone for the new Church Hall. In this manner, almost all the diverse elements of the church precinct have some form of connection with members of the Macarthur family.

The place is important in demonstrating aesthetic characteristics and/or a high degree of creative or technical achievement in New South Wales.

St John's Anglican Church Precinct has aesthetic significance at a State level as a fine group of ecclesiastic buildings with a cemetery located in an open rural landscape resplendent with mature native and exotic trees, rolling grassed slopes, fence lines, paths, and memorials. This open setting creates important interconnecting views and vistas between different elements of the church precinct, such as that between the church and rectory, that allows for their proper appreciation. On a broader scale this open setting complements St John Anglican Church, and particular its tower and spire, by opening it to a wider catchment of views and vistas across the regional landscape. This allows the church to be the focus of the great picturesque character of the region which is the result of the landscape design implement by the Macarthurs in their development of Camden. In the landscape design St John's is the pinnacle of the township and the apex of many important vistas. As such, it has an all-encompassing relationship with its landscape and has important inter-relationships with the Camden Park Estate, Camden Park House, and the township of Camden that expresses the power structures between these places.

St John's plays a key role in the picturesque landscape planning of the Camden Park Estate and particularly, Camden Park House. This is demonstrated by a picturesque vista of St John's available from the front carriageway loop of Camden Park House. It was part of the early design of the mansion and its surrounding countryside and it has been cultivated into the surrounding garden to the present by the Macarthur family. This vista features St John's tower and spire framed by the peaks of Mount Hay and Banks of the Blue Mountains range in the distance as its focal point. Its exemplary picturesque design is evident in the intricate details and variety in contains that are expressed in its contrasting textures created by the juxtaposition between nature and man-made structures and landscapes. This vista was deliberately planned to delight and interest the eye and mind of early nineteenth century observers and the medieval inspired design of St John's was a fitting centrepiece according to the dictates of the picturesque. This vista is reciprocated by a view of Camden Park House from the front steps of St John's Anglican Church.

St John's is an important part in the framework of power dynamics the Macarthurs embedded in their regional landscape design to reinforce the social structures they wished to perpetuate. This featured the Macarthurs as the ruling upper gentry; the Anglican church, patronised and guided by the Macarthurs, as the moral compass of the community; and the middle and working classes as the lowest social strata. This social structure is expressed firstly through the distant vista of St John's from Camden Park House as described above which demonstrates the relationship the Macarthur family wished to cultivate with the Anglican Church in Camden; one of patronage and firm guidance. It is secondly expressed in the relationship of St John's Anglican Church with the township design of Camden as envisioned by James and William Macarthur and put into effect by Sir Thomas Mitchell. In this design, St John's is purposely situated on top of a hill over the town that ensures that it dominates the local landscape. This design ensures that the church, and particularly its tower and spire, was a reminder to the community of the watchful presence of God and the Anglican Church. This effect was further accentuated by the commanding vista of St John's along John Street that was purposefully planned into the town design by Mitchell.

St John's Anglican Church has technical significance at a State level as the earliest, and one of the finest, examples of archaeologically correct Gothic Revival architecture in the state (and possibly nationally). This church embodies the aims of the early development of the Gothic Revival movement in the Colony. As such, it is a successful early example that was likely used as a precedent in the local Gothic Revival movement throughout the remainder of the nineteenth century. The church's fine construction, completeness, and good condition further enhance its significance against this criterion.

The place has potential to yield information that will contribute to an understanding of the cultural or natural history of New South Wales.

St John's Anglican Church has research potential in a state context as the first archaeologically correct Gothic Revival church constructed in the colony. The church's fine construction and completeness, with its tower, spire, clock, bells, stained glass, organ, and furniture all being intact add to its significance against this criterion. St John's Anglican Church retains many elements of its original built fabric, which makes it a unique repository for the future study of nineteenth century technology and artisan's crafts. These aspects of the church make it an important research resource for the study of Gothic Revival architecture in the state context (and perhaps nationally).

The Bates & Son pipe organ (c.1860) in St John's Anglican Church is the only known extant example constructed by this maker in NSW. This makes it an important research resource in the state context.

The place possesses uncommon, rare or endangered aspects of the cultural or natural history of New South Wales.

St John's Anglican Church is rare in a state context as the first archaeologically correct Gothic Revival church constructed in the colony. The church's fine construction and completeness, with its tower, spire, clock, bells, stained glass, organ, and furniture all being intact add to its significance against this criterion.

The Bates & Son pipe organ (c.1860) is rare in a state context as the only known extant example produced by these manufactures.

St John's Anglican Church Precinct is rare in a state context as a complete ensemble of parish church buildings (church, rectory, cemetery, and grounds). It is one of the most complete church groups achieved in the colony in the nineteenth century.

The place is important in demonstrating the principal characteristics of a class of cultural or natural places/environments in New South Wales.

St John's Anglican Church is of state significance as a representative example of early architecturally correct Gothic Revival architecture in the colony. The church's fine construction and completeness, with its tower, spire, clock, bells, stained glass, organ, and furniture all being intact add to its significance against this criterion.

St John's Anglican Church Precinct is of state significance as a representative example of a complete ensemble of parish church buildings dating to the nineteenth century.

== See also ==
- List of Anglican churches in New South Wales
- List of Edmund Blacket buildings
