= St Peter's Anglican Church, Richmond =

Church in New South Wales, Australia (ty for the article whoever did it)

St Peter's Anglican Church
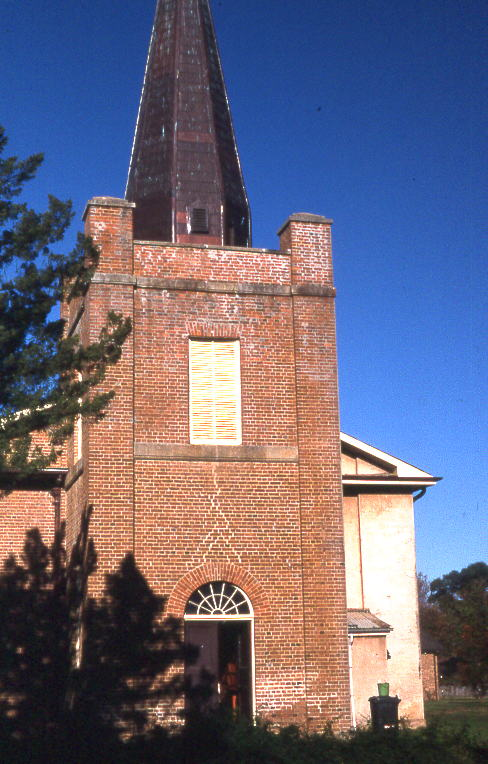
- St Peter's Church, pictured in 2009

- Location in greater metropolitan Sydney
- 33°35′38″S 150°44′39″E
- Location: 384 Windsor Street, Richmond, City of Hawkesbury, New South Wales
- Country: Australia
- Denomination: Anglican
- Website: richmondanglican.com.au

History
- Status: Church
- Consecrated: 15 July 1841 by Bishop William Broughton

Architecture
- Functional status: Active
- Architects: Francis Clarke (church and rectory); Edmund Blacket (rectory additions - 1863)
- Architectural type: Old Colonial Georgian
- Years built: 1836–1841

Administration
- Province: New South Wales
- Diocese: Sydney
- Parish: Richmond

Clergy
- Rector: Rev. Rick Hall

New South Wales Heritage Register
- Official name: St Peter's Anglican Church Group; St Peter's Church Group; Church; Rectory; Church Yard; Cemetery; Stables
- Type: State heritage (complex / group)
- Designated: 16 August 2019
- Reference no.: 2028
- Type: Church
- Category: Religion
- Builders: James Atkinson (church)

New South Wales Heritage Database (Local Government Register)
- Official name: St Peter's Anglican Church Hall and Cemetery; St Peter's Church Group; Church, Cemetery, Rectory and Sunday School Hall
- Type: Local government heritage (complex / group)
- Designated: 12 September 2012
- Reference no.: I129
- Type: Church
- Category: Religion

St Peter's Anglican Church is a heritage-listed Anglican church and associated Sunday school, rectory, and cemetery at 384 Windsor Street, Richmond, City of Hawkesbury, New South Wales, Australia. It was designed by Francis Clarke (church and rectory) and Edmund Blacket (rectory additions in 1863) and built from 1836 to 1841 by James Atkinson (church). It is also known as St Peter's Anglican Church Group, St Peter's Church Group, Church, Rectory, Church Yard, Cemetery and Stables. It was added to the New South Wales State Heritage Register on 16 August 2019; and on the City of Hawkesbury local government heritage register, and listed on the New South Wales Heritage Database on 12 September 2012.

== History ==
The site of St Peter's Church was nominated in Governor Lachlan Macquarie's planned layout for Richmond. He intended to have the church, schoolhouse and burial ground on a very beautiful elevated block immediately above Pugh's Lagoon, a fine basin of fresh water. The burial ground, then one hectare (2.5 acres), was surveyed by James Meehan and consecrated by the Reverend Samuel Marsden and fenced by William Cox. The first burial was George Rouse and contains the headstones of many early Hawkesbury settlers The first school/church opened in 1810. It played an important part in the early life of Richmond. It was situated in Francis Street near the northern corner of the cemetery. The lower floor was the residence of the schoolmaster whilst the upper room was used for school and church purposes.

This building soon became too small to meet the ever increasing congregation and at a meeting chaired by the Reverend Samuel Marsden on 26 November 1835 the inhabitants of Richmond resolved to erect a church for the celebration of divine worship. A notice calling for tenders to erect the church appeared in The Australian on 18 October 1836. The committee formed to forward the project included Mr Cox, Senior (Fairfield), Mr Cox, Jnr (Hobartville), Mr Bell (Belmont), Mr George Bowman, Mr William Bowman, Mr Faithful, Rev H. T. Styles, Mr Martin, Snr., Mr G. Palmer, Mr Digit, Mr C. Powell, Mr Parnell and Mr C. P. Wood. By 1833 A£570 had been subscribed and A£200 had been donated by the English Church Society. Tenders were called for the erection of the church in The Australian in October 1836.

Built as a result of the establishment of the Church Act of 1840 St Peter's Church was one of four churches consecrated in 1841. The church was built on a site overlooking Ham Common and the Hawkesbury River flats. It was agreed 162 hectares (400 acres) of the common would be given as Glebe land for the church. It was opened by Bishop William Broughton on 15 July and designed by Francis Clark and built by James Atkinson who also built St Bartholomew's, Prospect and St Thomas, Mulgoa at the same time. It was designed in the Old Colonial Georgian style in contrast to most of the other churches, except St Batholomew's, which have Gothic style detailing. Clarke was responsible for a number of Sydney houses and the church of St Mary Magdalene at St Marys. A simple rectangular building with a square tower topped with a timber spire the original layout of the pews was to face inwards to the centre of the church. In 1850 a porch designed by Edmund Blackett was added to the northern side and not long after, in 1857, a chancel was added. Once the chancel had been added the internal pew layout was altered to face the chancel. William Woolls, a prominent late nineteenth century writer on the botany and flora of Australia was incumbent at St Peter's from 1873 and from 1877 to 1883, the Rural Dean of Richmond.

In the churchyard a small obelisk was built of bricks from the old school church building.

The cemetery is older than the church and contains the graves of many early pioneers including John Bowman, Thomas Matcham Pitt and Lt Thomas Hobby of the NSW Corps, the Chief Officer at Hawkesbury in 1800 and a supporter of Macquarie. It was the second cemetery dedicated in the Hawkesbury district, around 1814, four years after St Matthews.

The rectory was designed by Clarke and completed in 1847 and is said to have been a copy of an English rectory known to Bishop Broughton in the mid 19th century vogue for picturesque rectories. It was added to in 1863 by Blacket. Later alterations have changed its quality.

== Description ==
=== Setting ===
The complex is located on the western edge of Richmond. The site falls away steeply to the west with buildings and burial ground on the higher level ground overlooking the surrounding lowlands. The site stretches over the north and south sides of Windsor Street and is bounded on the south side by Kurrajong Road. The church is on a prominent isolated site, high at the end of the ridge on which the town of Richmond had been positioned in 1810. It bears a strong relationship (in typical English fashion) between church, cemetery, rectory, stables and township.

=== Church ===
An Old Colonial Georgian style church three bays long with a parapeted tower with a metal spire at the west end and a gabled chancel at the east end. A gabled porch entry is centred on the north side of the church. The church has a simple gabled roof with wide boxed eaves. The gables form pediments at each end. The windows to the body of the church are arched multipane sashes with coloured glass sashes being installed to 5 of the windows in 1874. The tower has multipane square headed windows to the first and second floor. The walls are constructed in locally made bricks with a sandstone plinth, string courses and window sills. Openings are finished with tuckpointed brickwork to the arches and bays are defined by engaged pilasters. The pilasters to the chancel use a contrasting darker brick. Internally the church is plastered with polished cedar joinery. The walls are painted a soft blue grey. The ceiling was replaced with plasterboard in 1964.The semi-circular headed windows are small paned; the pews and gallery are of cedar. The porch was added in 1850 and a crying room in 1988.

=== The rectory ===
Two-storey Victorian Rustic Gothic style house built with locally made bricks. The roof has intersecting steeply pitched gables and two brick chimneys, now rendered. A dormer window is located on the north elevation. The original roofing has been replaced with concrete tiles. The south and west walls have been rendered. A rear kitchen wing has been added. The original gabled entry porch has been replaced with a verandah on the north side of the east wing. Original venetian sash windows survive to the north and south walls of the west wing, most others have been replaced, altering the gothic proportions of the house. Internally the house is austere in detail. The original geometric stair survives as do chimney pieces.

=== Sunday school (hall) ===
A simple gabled hall with some Victorian Rustic Gothic detailing to the windows and porch of the south elevation. The walls are brick, the roof is corrugated steel and trimmed with plain bargeboards and simple finials. A gabled entry porch is centred on the north side of the hall. The main hall runs north south and is divided into 4 bays. The windows all have arches of contrasting tuck pointed brickwork. A rear addition exists with a low pitched gable roof. Internally the hall has its original floor of wide timber boards, painted brick walls, exposed king post trusses and boarded timber ceiling. The original fireplace in the east wall survives.

=== Cemetery ===
A large churchyard enclosed by a hedge and post and rail fence on one side and by bordering trees. There are no trees within the site, It adjoins St Peter's Church across Windsor Street, its central path leading to the church door. Cemetery and church occupy a magnificent site along the top of the terrace overlooking the Richmond Bottoms. The older headstones are closer to the terrace edge although modern graves have been mixed sympathetically with them. The comerery is quite densely developed with some large monuments and statuary of the Victorian period, their vertical nature emphasised by their massing. A number of headstones are badly eroded, inscriptions unreadable and some have fallen. Dominated by the spire of St Peter's to the south, the site is very tranquil and rural in character.

=== Coach house and stables ===
The coach house and stables are located to the south of the rectory and on axis with the entry hall and stair of the rectory. It is a simple gabled brick building. The roof is corrugated steel. The lower rooms have few windows. The doors and louvered openings were reconstructed in 1992. There is evidence of lathe and plaster ceilings to the ground floor rooms. The floors are brick flagged. The loft also has evidence of lathe and plaster ceilings. A skillion has been added to the east side. The site has archaeological potential.

=== Plantings ===
The Churchyard contains a number of mature plantings, including the following trees: pepper tree (Schinus areira); black locust/false acacia (Robinia pseudoacacia); orchid tree (Bauhinia speciosa); Jacaranda mimosifolia; silky oaks (Grevillea robusta); southern nettle trees (Celtis australis); privets (Ligustrum spp.); white cedars (Melia azederach var. australasica); trident maple (Acer buergerianum); camphor laurels (Cinnamomum camphora); oaks (Quercus spp.); English elm (Ulmus procera); golden Monterey cypress (Cupressus macrocarpa 'Aurea' ); Chinese juniper (Juniperus chinensis) (a 10-metre (33 ft) tall hedge of this species near the main road); tree of heaven (Ailanthus altissima); Mediterranean cypress (Cupressus sempervirens); Chinese elm (Ulmus chinensis); and a long-needled pine species (Pinus sp., possibly P.roxburghii/P.canariensis); and including the following shrubs: Syrian hibiscus, (H.syriacus); sky flower (Duranta plumieri); Cape plumbago (P.capensis); laurustinus (Viburnum tinus).

It is thought that the church roof over the nave, prior to the construction of the chancel and porch, was hipped with the eastern extremity altering to a pediment gable, when the chancel was added. The original slate roof has now been replaced along with other roof repairs. The remaining structural fabric is extant, however the internal pen configuration, ceiling fabric and some windows have been altered and/or replaced. Although it has lost its original kitchen wing, the main part of the rectory survives, together with the associated coach house and stables and privy.

=== Modifications and dates ===
- 1849 – A barrel organ was installed
- 1850 – The porch designed by E Blackett was added
- 1856 – The chancel was added and the internal layout of the pews were changed to face the chancel
- 1866 – A portion of the church lighting was changed from candles to kerosene
- 1874 – The plain glass window in the nave was changed to stained glass to give it a more dignified appearance
- 1891 – The stone based iron railing and gates were installed
- 1956 – The spire was demolished by a storm and subsequently rebuilt
- 1964 – The original lathe and plaster ceiling was replaced after it failed due to water damage
- 1971 – The spire was again repaired after storm damage to the sheet metal
- 1970s – Burial ground extended to include land on the north side of the former Sunday School *1988 – A crying room was created within the interior of the church beneath the gallery

Other modifications have included the cement rendering of the southern wall Proudfoot says the porch on northern side and chancel were added 1870s and a panelled gallery was built.

== Heritage listing ==
As at 26 August 2019, St Peter's Anglican Church Group (church, cemetery, school hall and rectory) was of state significance as a highly intact group of Victorian and Colonial Georgian church buildings in their landscape setting. The groups historical significance is amplified as it is a central element in Governor Macquarie's town plan for Richmond, one of the five Maquarie Towns he laid out during his governorship. The church and its surrounding buildings and cemetery has been a landmark site since its establishment. Constructed between 1836 and 1841, the church is also historically significant, at a state level, as one of the first churches to make use of government funds for religious buildings made available under the then newly legislated 1836 Church Act. The cemetery is one of the earliest cemeteries in NSW in continuous use, with the first burial there dating back to 1809.

The St Peter's Anglican Church Group is of state heritage significance for its association with Governor Macquarie who planned and personally selected the site of the town of Richmond with the church as an important element of the plan. St Peter's Church Group may be of state heritage significance for its association with the Government Colonial Architect, Francis Clarke, noted colonial architect Edmund Blackett and with the first Bishop of the Church of England in Australia, Bishop Broughton who consecrated the church and had a hand in funding the works through the administration of the 1836 Church Act.

The siting of the group of buildings and cemetery on the edge of the western escarpment overlooking the lowlands and with views to the Blue Mountains contributes to its aesthetic significance at a state level as it creates and is maintained as an important colonial landscape. The church in particular is a rare intact example of Colonial Georgian architectural expression in church design. Together the Church, Rectory and outbuildings, School Hall and cemetery creates a fine group of Georgian and Victorian buildings in a parkland setting.

The St Peter's Anglican Church Group is a rare and representative example of a Colonial and Victorian Church group that retains its park like and semi rural setting. The church itself is a rare example of a Colonial Georgian church building in NSW. The group of church buildings and cemetery is of state heritage significance as they demonstrate the aesthetic tastes of Macquarie's time with the church buildings used as a dominant reference point for a village and surrounding countryside.

St Peter's Anglican Church Group was listed on the New South Wales State Heritage Register on 16 August 2019 having satisfied the following criteria.

The place is important in demonstrating the course, or pattern, of cultural or natural history in New South Wales.

St Peter's Anglican Church Group is of historic significance as a central element in plan for Richmond, one of the five towns on the Cumberland Plain laid out by Governor Macquarie during his term as Governor of New South Wales. It is of significance at a state level for its ability to demonstrate the continuous development and use of the site by the Anglican Church and the church's importance to the young colony. It is also historically significant to NSW as it was one of the first churches to make use of the government funds for religious buildings after the introduction of the 1836 Church Act.

The place has a strong or special association with a person, or group of persons, of importance of cultural or natural history of New South Wales's history.

The church group has state heritage significance for its association with Governor Lachlan Macquarie who laid out the town of Richmond with the church as focal element in the town design. It also has state heritage significance for its association with Colonial Government Architect Francis Clarke, with noted colonial architect Edmund Blackett and with the first Bishop of the Church of England in Australia, Bishop Broughton. Bishop Broughton who consecrated the church.

The place is important in demonstrating aesthetic characteristics and/or a high degree of creative or technical achievement in New South Wales.

St Peter's Anglican Church Group is of state level aesthetic significance as a highly intact group of Victorian and Colonial Georgian church buildings in its remnant colonial landscape setting. The church in particular is a rare and intact example of Colonial Georgian architectural expression in church design. The siting of the group of buildings and cemetery overlooking the lowlands to the river and with views to the blue mountains are aesthetically distinctive and comprise a landmark entry and exit to and from the west to Richmond. . The group of church buildings and cemetery is of state heritage significance as they demonstrate the aesthetic tastes of Macquarie's time with the church buildings used as a dominant reference point for a village and surrounding countryside.

The place has a strong or special association with a particular community or cultural group in New South Wales for social, cultural or spiritual reasons.

The St Peter's church group has been and continues to be associated with the Richmond Anglican community since 1810. St Peter's Church has been and continues to be the spiritual focus of the local Anglican community since its consecration in 1841. The burial ground has been in continuous use since 1809 and has strong associations with members of the local community. The Sunday School has social significance for the local community for its earlier use as a school and more recently for community groups.

The place has potential to yield information that will contribute to an understanding of the cultural or natural history of New South Wales.

St Peter's burial ground has been in continuous use since 1809 when George Rouse was buried on the site. As a burial ground for many of Richmond's pioneers it is the starting place for much information about many or Richmond's early settlers and later citizens. The Church retains many of its earlier records including baptismal, marriage and burial registers, minute and account books etc. which provide extensive information about the development of the town, its people and the church group itself.

The place possesses uncommon, rare or endangered aspects of the cultural or natural history of New South Wales.

St Peter's Anglican Church Group is a rare example of a Colonial and Victorian Church group that retains its parklike and semi-rural setting. The church is a rare example of an Old Colonial Georgian church building in NSW.

The place is important in demonstrating the principal characteristics of a class of cultural or natural places/environments in New South Wales.

The St Peter's Anglican Church Group has representative values at a state level as it is a fine example of a group of Colonial and Victorian Church group in its landscape setting. The group demonstrates the principle characteristics of a group of Colonial and Victorian church buildings and is distinguished as one of the five church building groups set out as a focal point to Macquarie's five colonial towns in the early colonial period.

== See also ==
- Anglican Diocese of Sydney
- List of Anglican churches in New South Wales
- List of Edmund Blacket buildings
