= Old Liverpool Hospital =

Liverpool Hospital
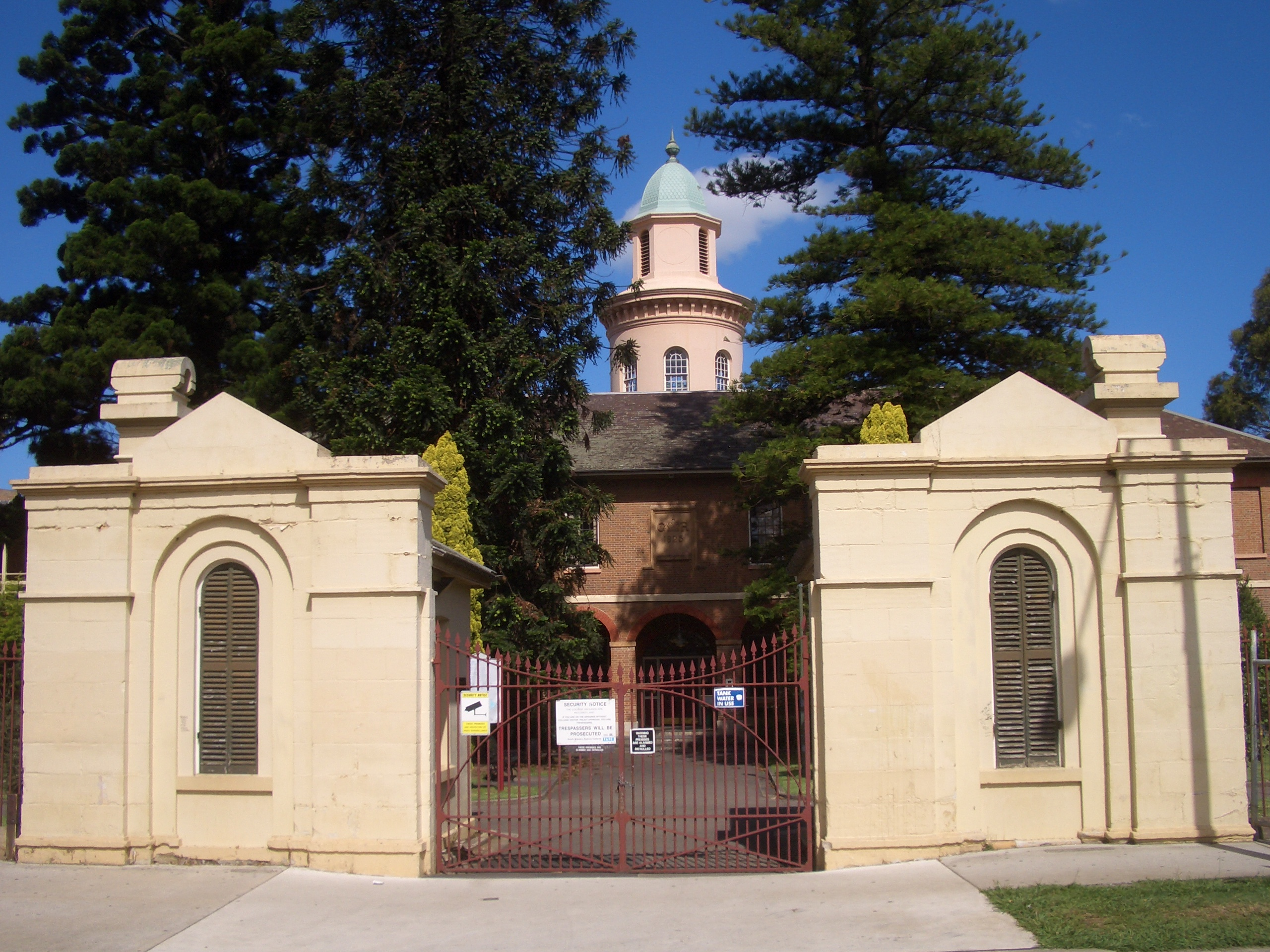

- Location within New South Wales Location within Australia
- 33.9217°S 150.9300°E
- Location: College Street, Liverpool, City of Liverpool, New South Wales, Australia

History
- Built: 1822–1958

Site notes
- Architect(s): Francis Greenway; Edmund Blacket; Walter Liberty Vernon
- Owner: TAFE NSW

New South Wales Heritage Register
- Official name: Liverpool TAFE College (former Liverpool Hospital); Colonial Medical Service Hospital; Benevolent Asylum; Government Asylum; State Hospital & Asylum; Technical College; South Western TAFE
- Type: state heritage (complex / group)
- Designated: 11 December 2009
- Reference no.: 1809
- Type: Tertiary College
- Category: Education
- Builders: Convict labour

Old Liverpool Hospital is a heritage-listed former hospital and now technical college at College Street, Liverpool, City of Liverpool, New South Wales, Australia. It was designed by Francis Greenway, Edmund Blacket and Walter Liberty Vernon and was built from 1822 to 1958, originally with the use of convict labour. Variously known as the Colonial Medical Service Hospital, Benevolent Asylum, Government Asylum and Liverpool State Hospital and Asylum, it is now the Liverpool campus of TAFE NSW. It was added to the New South Wales State Heritage Register on 11 December 2009.

== History ==
=== Aboriginal occupation of the Liverpool region ===
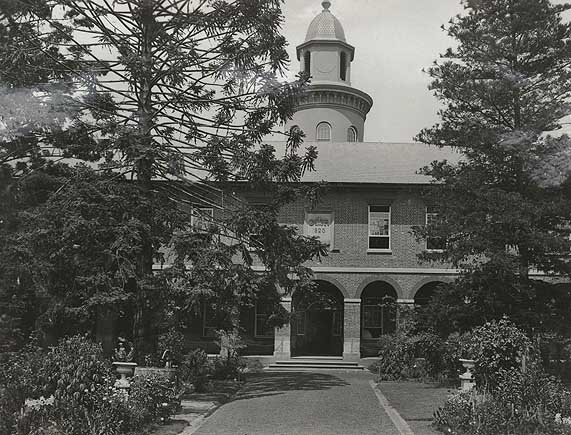
The building in the Liverpool State Hospital era

Some 40,000 years before the colonisation of Liverpool, this land was occupied by the Darug people and the neighbouring Tharawal and Gandangara tribes. The land was known as Gunyungalung and the Georges River was the natural boundary between the Darug, or "woods" tribe, and the "coast" tribes of Tharawal and Gandangara. Although there was a long and established occupation of the site prior to colonisation, there are no known Aboriginal sites within the former Liverpool Hospital complex.

=== European colonisation and the establishment of the first Liverpool Hospital ===
In 1810, following the lead of the prominent pioneer Thomas Moore, Governor Lachlan Macquarie set out on a surveying expedition along the newly discovered Georges River. On the undulating Cumberland Plain and the banks of the Georges River, Governor Macquarie located the new township of Liverpool.

The construction of a hospital, to accommodate and service the health requirements of a predominantly convict population, was an early development in Liverpool and one granted a picturesque location on the banks of the Georges River. Macquarie chose this position because he envisioned the hospital building to be striking when viewed from either the river itself or from the township.

Macquarie's original use of this location was as the site of the first Liverpool hospital, built in 1810. This first hospital was a small brick, three-room construction built to accommodate up to 30 patients. For a growing population such as Liverpool's, this first hospital quickly became overcrowded and under-equipped to service the township. Although coming to the end of his time as governor, Macquarie undertook one of his grandest projects in the construction of the second (and surviving) Liverpool Hospital. This project was to become part of Macquarie's lasting legacy and it was the last major design involving Francis Greenway, Macquarie's appointed Civil Architect.

=== Construction of Liverpool Hospital (Block B) ===
In 1820, Macquarie called upon Greenway to draw up the early designs for the new Liverpool Hospital. Following Macquarie's return to England in 1822 and the downgrading of significant colonial investment in public works, the designs for the Liverpool Hospital were reassessed and altered by Greenway to suit the needs of the incoming governor, Sir Thomas Brisbane. To the north of the first 1810 hospital, construction of the new facility commenced in 1822 but, following the laying of the foundations and a quarrel over the prepared estimates and bills, Greenway was dismissed by Governor Brisbane and a new government architect, Standish Lawrence Harris, was appointed. Harris inspected the foundations already in place and concluded that, due to poor materials and workmanship, the footings should be removed and relaid. By the end of 1822, these foundations had been replaced and construction of the walls was underway.

With Greenway's departure in 1822 and the growing attention being paid to the extended public budget, progress on the hospital construction slowed. Although attributed to Greenway, there is conflicting evidence as to whose design the current construction actually reflects. Since leaving the project in 1822, and the official starting date of construction in 1824, there is a significant chance that Greenway's plans were reviewed and altered according to the direction of the governor of the time. The earliest surviving plans of the hospital construction, "Plans and Elevation of the General Hospital Liverpool", date from 1825/26. Being unsigned, there is no tangible evidence to indicate whether the original Greenway designs survived intact or in an altered form. With Brisbane's time as governor of the colony coming to an end in 1825, and the arrival of Governor Ralph Darling, the construction of the hospital was, once again, continued under the direction of a new governor. Although the walls of the hospital were complete and the roof construction was underway, it is possible that the plans may well have undergone changes after 1825.

By December 1829, the construction of the Liverpool Hospital was finally complete. After seven years of construction, and multiple suspected changes to its original design, the final building was a distinct departure from the simple box-like structures of many public buildings in the colony. This creative design, although possibly altered, is attributed to Greenway's design skills and the influence of the former Governor Macquarie on the creation of the civic environment in the colony.

Despite construction commencing in 1822 (though officially in 1824) and finishing in 1829, the main building of the former Liverpool Hospital complex has a distinctive "1825" embossed sandstone plaque above the entrance. As this date does not correlate with either the commencement or conclusion of the construction work, it is undetermined what the 1825 date actually relates to. Perhaps it is the date of the earliest surviving plans, but this reference remains unsubstantiated.

While the construction of the main hospital building was underway, the convict labourers also undertook the construction of the brick wall that surrounds the complex, that has survived largely intact. By 1829, convict bricklayers and stonemasons had built a 10-foot high wall, with stone entrance pillars, that was to remain, almost in its entirety, as a historical boundary for the site. This wall has limited the physical expansion of the site throughout its history and ensured that, while the site did not expand, the buildings and the land had a continual history of adaption, modification and reuse.

=== Colonial Medical Service Hospital (1830–51) ===
Following the completion of the construction of the main building in 1829 (there were some outbuildings to be completed in the following years), the Liverpool Hospital was officially opened with the Colonial Medical Service tenanting the new building. With Liverpool being the new centre for the dispatch of convict labour gangs in the colony, the objective of the health service was to care for the significant convict population in the area. Control of the new hospital was undertaken by James Bowman, the Principal Surgeon and head of the Service. The facility was available to convicts labouring for the government free of charge. A fee, of between one and three shillings, was charged for free settlers and to convicts assigned to private colonists. The large convict population of Liverpool's early years fell away with the cessation of transportation to NSW from 1840 and the population of the promising new township started to decline. Without the population numbers needed to support the hospital, and with the inmates' accommodation and facilities becoming increasingly unhygienic and inadequate, the hospital soon lost its purpose and was vacated by the Colonial Medical Service in 1845.

=== Benevolent Society (1851–62) ===
The hospital site lay vacant for a short time but in 1850 both the Roman Catholic Church and the Benevolent Society were vying for the use of the site. The Benevolent Society, a government-supported organisation that Governor Macquarie had established in 1820, was a facility to care for the sick, destitute and aging population in Sydney and, with the original Sydney Asylum (near present-day Central railway station) becoming increasingly overcrowded, the Society needed to acquire a new branch and expand quickly. The Society assessed the Liverpool site and, following approval for their use, opened this branch of the Benevolent Society in 1851, with the transfer of 240 male inmates. To reuse the site, additional buildings and alterations were required and the Government Architect, Edmund Blacket was called upon to make the necessary alterations and preparations to convert the hospital site to an asylum at a cost of 525 pounds. For his efforts, Blacket was made an Honorary Life Member of the Society. Despite the changes, the site was never adequate for the needs of the Benevolent Society, and it was becoming overcrowded even in 1852. Using the labour of the asylum inmates, further changes were made to accommodate additional beds but, by 1862, the Government had grown dissatisfied with the work of the Benevolent Society and it took over control and the future running of the facility.

=== Government Asylum (1862–1918) ===
The Government's takeover of the asylum signalled a major change in policy for health care in the colony. Approximately 403 patients were residing at the asylum at this time and the government appointed a Superintendent, Thomas Burnside, a retired army sergeant, to take over the day-to-day running of the facility. His wife, Mary Burnside, was appointed as the Matron to continue with the care of the patients in residence, alongside her husband. Following Thomas' death in 1869, William Strong was appointed as Medical Superintendent, from 1871 to 1886. He and Mary Burnside formed a remarkable professional team that, by the late 1870s, had cared for no fewer than 700 destitute, aged and infirm patients. In 1886, Strong was replaced by Joseph Aloysius Beattie, a hard but fair superintendent who remained at the Liverpool Asylum until his retirement in 1916. To compensate for the low salary for the professional medical superintendents at the asylum, Beattie was entitled to run a private practice from the site, even though this took him away from his work for long periods each day. Following his retirement, Beattie's private practice was taken on by his successors Dr MacDonald and Dr J. Pirie.

The Government Asylum period was one of great change to the site. With the rate of admissions growing steadily, the main hospital building was in need of extension and more permanent additions to accommodate the increasing numbers of inmates requiring care. The surviving wings flanking the main building (Blocks A & C) were designed by Edmund Blacket and constructed in 1866 and 1874, respectively. In an effort to be architecturally sympathetic to the design of the main hospital building, Blacket constructed these two-storey brick and slate wings to complement, without detracting from, the dominant physical presence of the 1820s hospital building (Block B).

As well as these adjoining wings, the former Liverpool Hospital complex has seen a long sequence of construction over the late nineteenth and early twentieth centuries, reflecting the changing needs of the site as a health facility. Many of these additions, alterations and constructions occurred while the Government was in control of the asylum because the once-model establishment was slowly disintegrating and was in dire need of repairs and new facilities. Block F was designed and constructed by Government Architect WL Vernon, c. 1902-07, to replace the former kitchen and laundry buildings that dated from the early nineteenth century. The kitchen had always been in a separate building, away from the hospital because of an existing fear of fire, but by the early twentieth century, it was decided to enclose the various structures and combine a number of small buildings into the single complex. Block F is also dominated by a tall brick chimneystack. Although the stack is believed to have been rebuilt (c. 1940s), the base appears to be original, dating from c. 1902.

The forecourt space to the main hospital building (Block B) is distinguished by landmark plantings of a number of mature, significant trees including a hoop pine (Araucaria cunninghamii); Bunya pine (Araucaria bidwillii) and a Norfolk Island pine (Araucaria heterophylla). These may date from c. 1850s but at least date from the Government Asylum era. Bunya pines were only "discovered" by Europeans in 1848 and brought from Queensland to NSW soon after, being rapidly planted in key private and public gardens since - notably Government buildings such as court houses, schools, hospitals. Hoop pines have been used from earlier, c. 1820s onward and Norfolk Island pines from earlier still. These araucaria trees featured in a c. 1920s drawing of the hospital made by architect and artist William Hardy Wilson in his book "Old Colonial Buildings of NSW and Tasmania". Block C has a mature native cypress/Port Jackson pine (Callitris rhomboidea) and a number of mature tree ferns (Alsophila sp. or Cyathea sp.) close to or against the building.

=== Liverpool State Hospital and Asylum (1918–58) ===
To accommodate the State hospital functions, this period of the former Liverpool Hospital complex saw major alterations and further additions to the site. The site had become one of the major hospitals in the Sydney metropolitan area and, by the early twentieth century, the government had every intention of extending the Liverpool Asylum to accommodate its additional hospital functions. Even though early negotiations had already progressed, the outbreak of the First World War saw the sale of the adjoining land fail to eventuate and, with the convict-built brick wall surrounding the complex, there was little opportunity to undertake further constructions to expand the facility. The remaining option for the Government, in order to continue its use of the hospital complex, was to redevelop and modify the existing buildings within the boundary walls. The intention was to bring the hospital complex up to current twentieth century standards. With new facilities provided to serve and care for the wider community, the Liverpool Hospital became one of the main state hospitals during this time.

However, by 1958, the existing buildings had become increasingly inadequate for the needs of the hospital and, being unable to easily adapt the built fabric to modern medical practices, the hospital was forced to move to a neighbouring location. This closure of the hospital, after almost 150 years, and its transfer to new facilities on an adjoining site, ended a long-standing and continuous history of servicing the health needs of the Liverpool community at this site. The 1960s saw the beginning of a new use for the site, as a tertiary education facility.

=== Liverpool Technical College (1960–present) ===
Following the closure of the hospital complex as a medical facility, the site and its existing buildings were acquired in June 1960 and converted for use as a Technical College. By July 1961, the conversion was complete and the College was opened. The College initiated a building conversion program that saw the demolition of some twentieth century additions to the site and the construction of a number of new buildings (Blocks J & K). Later, the College became the South Western Sydney Institute of TAFE.

=== Comparisons with other NSW convict and colonial hospitals ===
The survival of the former Liverpool Hospital is rare in terms of early hospitals in NSW. The earliest hospital in Sydney, established in 1788, was a portable tent hospital at George Street, The Rocks. In 1810, Governor Macquarie started construction on the Sydney (Rum) Hospital, completed in 1816. This was the first permanent hospital in the colony but only the northern wing (now Parliament House) and the southern wing (now The Mint) have survived. The central wing was demolished and rebuilt in the late nineteenth century as the present Sydney Hospital.

The Parramatta Hospital was the oldest continually occupied site for public health in Australia (for 200 years) but this site has undergone various changes over its history. The original 1789 hospital was replaced by two convict-era hospitals (1792 & 1818) that were then replaced by the 1896-1901 building that was severely modified over the twentieth century. Demolished in 2004, the site has been redeveloped as the Parramatta Justice Precinct with the in situ conservation of the Parramatta Hospital Archaeological Site, including most significant archaeology of the convict and colonial hospital buildings (1792-1901).

As one of the oldest existing hospital complexes in Australia, there are few sites with comparable built fabric and archaeology, which equate to that of the former Liverpool Hospital.

== Description ==
=== Site and building complex (1820s) ===
The former Liverpool Hospital site is bounded by a brick wall that was built by convict bricklayers and stonemasons in the late 1820s. This wall remains largely intact and has acted as a hindrance to the expansion of the site throughout its history, therefore prompting the reuse and modifications of the site and its buildings over the years. This physical hindrance to any further expansion of the site has also seen the retention of the hierarchical layout of the complex, with any development (bar Blocks J and K) being respectful to the dominating presence of the main Block B hospital building. A small section of the brick wall was demolished and rebuilt in the mid-nineteenth century, but the majority of the brick and stonework, lime mortar joinery and metal fence and gates are original (a section of the wall at the rear of the site, backing onto the railway line, has been permanently removed).

=== Gate Keepers Cottages (1820s) ===
The fence and the entrance to the former hospital complex, is also flanked by two small rendered brick and slate Gate-Keepers Cottages (Blocks S and T). Positioned at the entrance of the site in front of the main hospital building, these cottages, built at the same time as Block B in the 1820s, have been internally renovated but retain their original external construction and joinery.

=== Main Building Forecourt and plantings ===
The forecourt space to the main hospital building (Block B) is distinguished by landmark plantings of a number of mature, significant coniferous trees including a hoop pine (Araucaria cunninghamii); Bunya pine (A.bidwillii) and a Norfolk Island pine (A.heterophylla). These may date from c. 1850s but at least date from the Government Asylum era. Bunya pines were only "discovered" by Europeans in 1848 and brought from Queensland to NSW soon after, being rapidly planted in key private and public gardens since - notably Government buildings such as court houses, schools, hospitals under the promotion of Directors of the Botanic Gardens Charles Moore and Joseph Maiden. Hoop pines have been used from earlier, c. 1820s onward and Norfolk Island pines from earlier still. These araucaria trees featured in a c. 1920s drawing of the hospital made by noted architect and artist William Hardy Wilson in his book "Old Colonial Buildings of NSW and Tasmania". Block C has a mature native cypress/Port Jackson pine (Callitris rhomboidea) and a number of mature tree ferns (Alsophila sp. or Cyathea sp.) close to or against the building.

=== Main Building (1820s Hospital) ===
The main 1820s hospital building (Block B), built by convict labour in the Colonial Georgian architectural style, is an ambitious yet simple brick construction with sandstone foundations and slate roof. Designed in a single-bay width to allow cross ventilation, the surviving building reflects its intended use and the development of hospital design in the colony. The final design of the building, topped with a substantially intact octagonal tower, demonstrates the high standard of convict building techniques and workmanship in the colony, their work still distinguishable by the broad arrow "frog" imprinted on the convict-made bricks. The architectural design of this fine building was also a distinct departure from the simple box design of public buildings, which is a reflection of the creativity of both Governor Macquarie and, possibly also, his appointed Civil Architect Francis Greenway, who has been attributed with the design.

=== Block B ===
With intact and fine brickwork and red rubbed curved arches, Block B retains much of its stylistic detailing today. However, the building has undergone a number of internal modifications throughout its history. The entrance of this building is marked with a double panelled front door with an elegant semi-circular fanlight above and sidelights at each side. Above this entrance-way is an embossed sandstone plaque marked "GR 1825" with an image of a crown. This marker may have been installed at this time but it refers to neither the date construction was started nor the year it was completed. Being the main building of the complex, Block B also contains a 28-metre (92-foot) central circular tower that is topped with an octagonal lantern and arched windows. Internally, this landmark tower retains much of its original cedar joinery and stone staircase.

=== Blocks A & C – 1866–74 Blacket wings ===
Flanking Block B, Blocks A and C are two Edmund Blacket-designed brick and slate wings that were a later addition to the main 1820s hospital building. Although built some 40 years later, in 1866 and 1874, these wings were sympathetically designed to complement the original building in both design and materials. These wings have intact and significant brickwork, tuck pointing, joinery and stairwells.

=== Block F (1902–07) ===
Constructed between 1902 and 1907, Block F is a conglomeration of kitchen and laundry blocks, along with some smaller buildings, that was designed by WL Vernon with asymmetrical planning and a complex roofline. Having combined an assortment of smaller-use buildings, Block F is now a brick complex with a number of entrances but no internal circulation. Block F is also dominated by a large brick chimneystack that is a physical representation of the early twentieth century hospital design and reflects the use of fossil fuels as an energy source during the early use of the site. The base of this stack appears to be original (c. 1902) but it is believed that the chimney has been rebuilt, possibly around the 1940s.

=== Block G (c. 1880s) ===
Block G, originally a store building, is a single-storey c. 1880s brick building with verandahs on three sides. Although there have been internal alterations, the external structure, internal joinery and a long roof lantern are original.

=== Block E (mid 19th century) ===
Block E, on the south-east part of the site, is a mid-nineteenth century single-storey brick and steel construction originally built as a dining hall. This building has undergone a number of additions and changes over the years.

=== Blocks J & K (20th century) ===
The harmonised architectural character of the site complex has been interrupted with the more recent, mid-twentieth century constructions of Blocks J and K. The single-storey Block J and the three-storey Block K are both brick buildings that do not integrate into the existing architectural context of the site and, as such, have low significance. Block K, in particular, has a negative physical impact on the site because of its immense scale, somewhat diminishing the scale of the main Block B building.

=== Modifications and dates ===
- 1830s: Block B was converted for use by the Benevolent Society as an asylum
- c. 1840: Kitchen block was added (site of Block F today)
- 1852–61: Additional buildings constructed by Benevolent Society, including Block E and a slab hut built alongside kitchen block (demolished c. 1860)
- 1862: Government carried out repairs to existing buildings and initiated the construction of Blocks A and C (completed 1866 and 1874)
- 1860s–70s: Covered walkway between Block B and kitchen rebuilt
- Portion of brick wall (northern section) rebuilt
- c. 1880s: Block G constructed
- c. 1899: Balconies on Blocks A and C were complete
- 1902–07: Block F (with chimneystack) constructed to combine kitchen, laundry and other small buildings
- 1918–58: Major alterations and further additions to the site to accommodate State hospital functions
- c. 1940s: Construction of Block H; Chimneystack (Block F) possibly replaced
- c. 1960s: Construction of Block J
- 1962–88: College carried out alterations and additions to the site to adapt to its use as an educational facility.
- 1970s: Construction of Block K
- 1975–76: National Estate Program grant of $10,000 for extensive work to preserve the fabric of the main building (part of much larger funding c, $300,000 for total works). Building occupied by various community organisations. Works done by Dept. of Public Works August 1984.
- 1989–99: Refurbishment of existing buildings

== Heritage listing ==
The former Liverpool Hospital complex is of State significance as one of the oldest, substantially intact colonial hospital complexes in Australia. The former hospital is also State significant for its long-standing, continuous history of servicing the health needs of, first the convicts and then of the wider Liverpool community from 1810 to 1958.

Built by convict labour, the main 1820s Colonial Georgian building (Block B), its design initiated by Governor Macquarie and attributed to Francis Greenway, is considered one of the finest colonial buildings remaining in Australia, demonstrating the high standard of workmanship carried out by the convict labour gangs. Convict labour was also used to construct the Gate-Keepers Cottages (Blocks S & T), c. 1820s, and the brick wall that continues, in the most part, to encircle the complex.

The surviving complex of buildings associated with the hospital period (Blocks A, B, C, S, T, F & G), are a fine representation of the high standard of architectural design and construction in the colony. Flanking the main hospital building, the Edmund Blacket-designed Blocks A and C complement the original 1820s building while the Walter Liberty Vernon-designed Block F was a sympathetic addition to the complex, c. 1902.

Liverpool Hospital is State significant for its associations with Governors Lachlan Macquarie (1810–21), Sir Thomas Brisbane (1821–25) and Sir Ralph Darling (1825–31), the Civil Architect, Francis Greenway (1816–22) and the Colonial/Government Architects, Edmund Blacket (1849–54) and Walter Liberty Vernon (1890–1911).

In situ archaeology of the original 1810 convict-built Macquarie hospital has State significance for its potential to demonstrate the development of hospital facilities from the earliest years of settlement, as well as the techniques and materials used by the convict labour gangs. The presence of pre-1850 archaeology is rare in NSW.

There are few sites around Australia comparable to the former Liverpool Hospital complex which has State significance for its historic, associative, aesthetic, social, research, rarity and representative values.

Liverpool Hospital was listed on the New South Wales State Heritage Register on 11 December 2009 having satisfied the following criteria.

The place is important in demonstrating the course, or pattern, of cultural or natural history in New South Wales.

The former Liverpool Hospital complex is of State significance as one of the oldest, finest and largely intact colonial hospital complexes in Australia. The surviving buildings from the hospital period (Blocks A, B, C, S, T, F & G) are highly significant in demonstrating the fine craftsmanship of the convict labour gangs of the colony as well as the development and conditions of hospitals and asylums in NSW over a 150-year period. The ongoing development and continuity of this site, from the earliest years of the nineteenth century colonial period up to the mid-twentieth century, is also significant in the history of this site as an early colonial convict hospital that evolved to service the needs of the wider Liverpool community. Having been enclosed within a convict-built brick wall since the 1820s, the historic use and expansion of the site has been restricted throughout the site's history. Excluding the more recent constructions from the c. 1960s (Blocks J & K), any additions or constructions were carried out to complement the existing hierarchical layout and context of the site. The main 1820s hospital building (Block B) had always exerted a dominating physical presence and, any addition to the site was constructed to complement and not detract from the hierarchy among the existing built fabric of the site.

The place has a strong or special association with a person, or group of persons, of importance of cultural or natural history of New South Wales's history.

The former Liverpool Hospital complex is of State significance for its association with the governors Lachlan Macquarie, Sir Thomas Brisbane and Sir Ralph Darling, who were all instrumental in its construction. Civil Architect Francis Greenway and Colonial/Government Architects Standish Harris, Edmund Blacket and W. L. Vernon were responsible for the design of various components of the site over its development as a hospital/asylum facility and, although the original design has been attributed to Greenway, being the last major building he designed for Governor Macquarie, it is unknown if the completed building was constructed entirely to his design. The former hospital complex also has associations with the medical practitioners, James Bowman, Joseph Beatty and Thomas and Mary Burnside.

The place is important in demonstrating aesthetic characteristics and/or a high degree of creative or technical achievement in New South Wales.

The former Liverpool Hospital complex is of State significance for the aesthetic inherent in its surviving built fabric. The earliest surviving and main 1820s hospital building (Block B) has remained, throughout the hospital's existence, the consistent centre of the site's layout. This ambitious, yet simple, Colonial Georgian building is topped with a significant 28 metre (92-foot) tower with an octagonal lantern and arched windows. With its adjoining Edmund Blacket-designed wings (Blocks A & C) and the smaller WL Vernon-designed buildings on the site, most designed to be sympathetic and complementary to the architectural harmony of the site through the use of matching materials and proportions, the complex is able to reflect the aesthetically attractive ambitions of the early colony. The design of Block B was a distinct departure from the typical box-like shape of public buildings, thus reflecting the creative design influence of Macquarie on the creation of the civic environment and, possibly, the government architect Francis Greenway, who has been attributed with the design. The quality and craftsmanship of the convict labour gangs is also reflected in the construction (their work still distinguishable by the broad arrow "frog" imprinted on the convict-made bricks).

The site also has State significance as a noted and iconic landmark in Liverpool and it is a site that is held in high esteem by the wider community and the architectural heritage industry. Many heritage professionals regard the site, particularly the main 1820s building (Block B), as one of the finest colonial buildings remaining in Australia.

The place has strong or special association with a particular community or cultural group in New South Wales for social, cultural or spiritual reasons.

The former Liverpool Hospital complex is of State significance as a site with a long and continuous history of servicing the health needs of the community over 150 years (from the earliest years of the penal settlement) and, since 1961, as an educational facility.

The place has potential to yield information that will contribute to an understanding of the cultural or natural history of New South Wales.

The former Liverpool Hospital complex is of State significance as one of the few known sites in Liverpool with pre-1850 archaeology. It is especially significant for the known archaeological remains of the 1810 hospital. A portion of the archaeology of the 1810 hospital has been recovered to date and the high possibility of uncovering further remains makes the former Liverpool Hospital site an important resource for early convict-era archaeology, of which there are very few, if any, examples, with comparable research value in Australia. On this site, the research potential to reveal evidence of the development of Liverpool and the construction and use of an early colonial hospital building is significant. This archaeology has potential to reveal an understanding of convict construction techniques and materials.

The place possesses uncommon, rare or endangered aspects of the cultural or natural history of New South Wales.

The former Liverpool Hospital complex is of State significance for its rarity as an early colonial public building that has had a long and continuous use, firstly as a health facility, initially for convicts and, later, for the wider Liverpool community (1810-1958). The survival of the former Liverpool Hospital is rare in terms of early hospitals in NSW.

With a long sequence of construction dating from 1810, the existence of pre-1850 archaeology on the site is extremely rare. Being one of the oldest remaining hospital complexes in Australia, there are few sites with comparable built fabric and archaeology, that equate to that of the former Liverpool Hospital. (See History - Comparisons with other NSW convict and colonial hospitals).

The main 1820s hospital building (Block B) is also rare in design as a distinct departure from the simple box-like construction of public buildings in the colony. This reflects on the influence of Governor Macquarie over the civic environment and, possibly also, the creativity of the government architect, Francis Greenway, who has been attributed with the design.

The former Liverpool Hospital site is enclosed within a convict-built brick wall, constructed alongside the main 1820s building. Although a small portion of this wall has been demolished and replaced (c. 1860), the wall is rare as a surviving example of the quality of craftsmanship of the convict labour gangs.

The place is important in demonstrating the principal characteristics of a class of cultural or natural places/environments in New South Wales.

The former Liverpool Hospital complex is of State significance as a representative, and largely intact, early public building from Governor Macquarie's ambitious public works program to develop Liverpool and the colony. The complex represents the design and character of early colonial hospital buildings in Australia and the technologies that were developing in the early colonial towns. The early hospital buildings reflect the high standard of architectural design and construction in the colonial period while the later buildings, resulting from the continuous construction program from the early nineteenth century, reflect the various approaches to hospital design philosophy, as well as the impact of the successive colonial and government architects on hospital design.
