= Transport in Sydney =

The TfNSW public transport roundels used in Sydney. Left to right: metro, train, bus, ferry, light rail

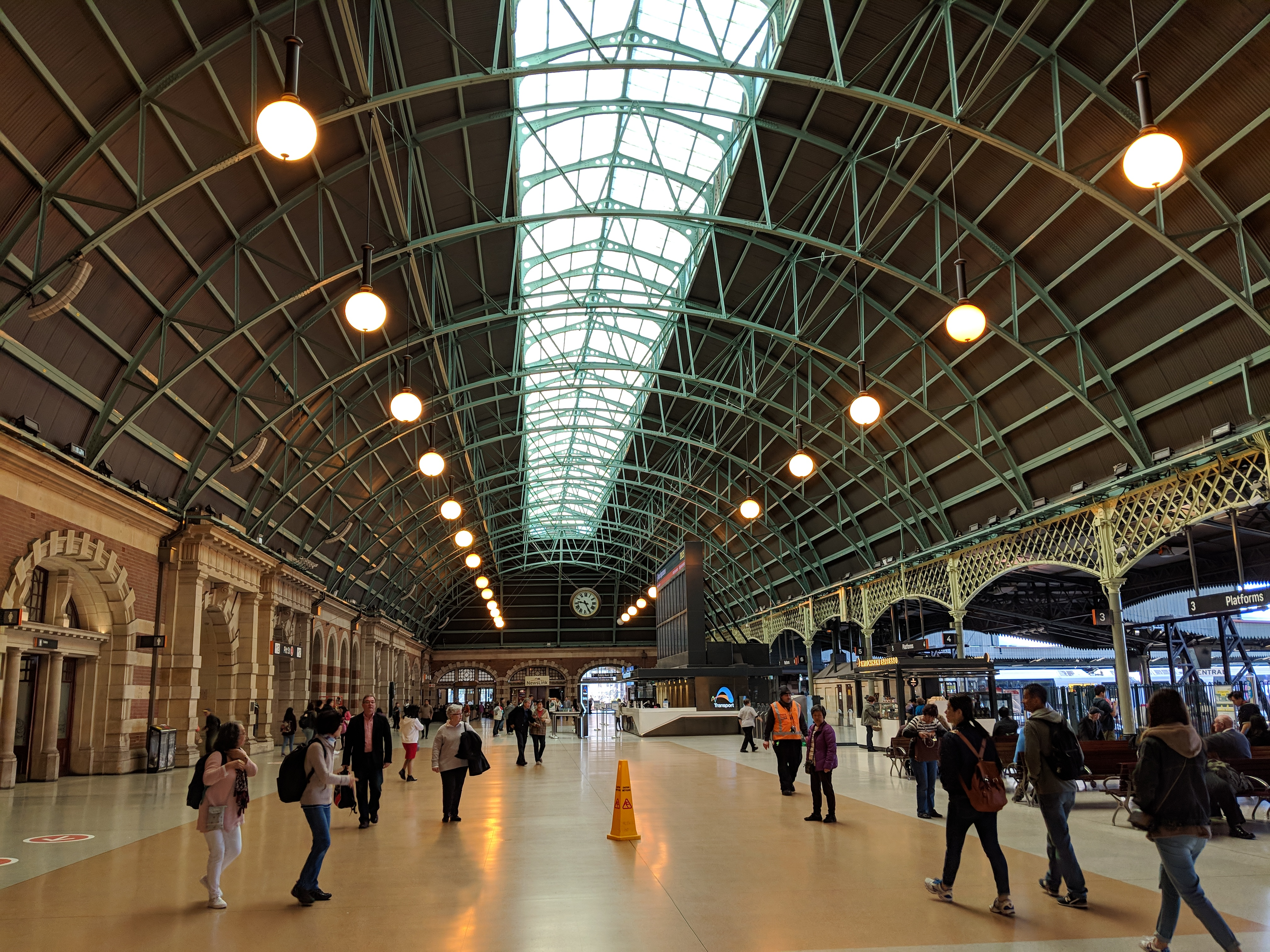
The Grand Concourse of Central station; a major hub for public transport services

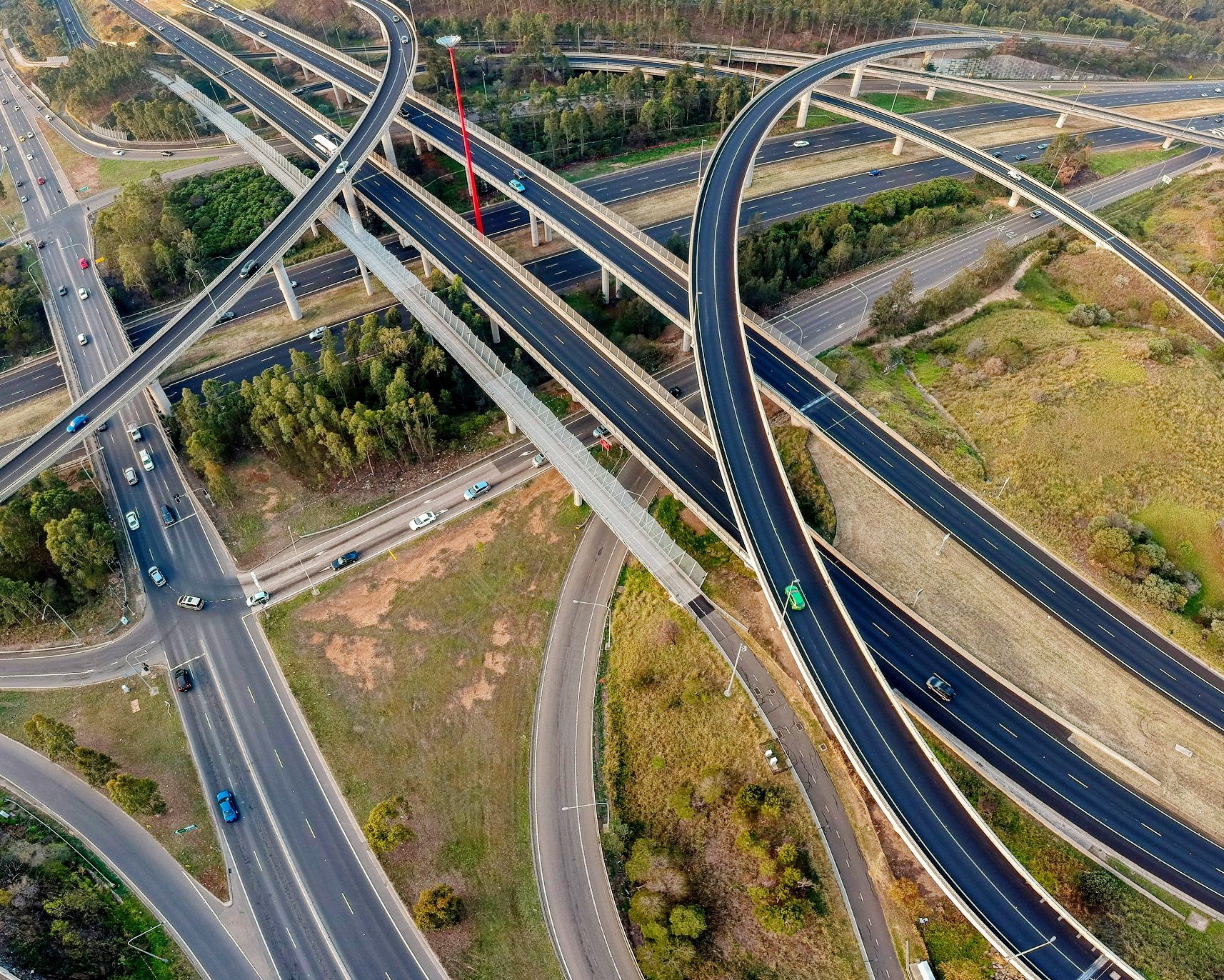
Light Horse Interchange, the largest of its kind in Australia

Transport in the Australian city of Sydney is provided by an extensive network of public transport operating modes including metro, train, bus, ferry and light rail, as well as an expansive network of roadways, cycleways and airports. According to the New South Wales State Plan, the state has Australia's largest public transport system. The public transport network is regulated by Transport for NSW.

In the 2006 census, Sydney had the highest rate of public transport usage among the Australian capital cities, with 26.3% usage, with more than 80% of weekday trips to/from Central Sydney being made by public transport.

== History ==
Sydney's early urban sprawl can be traced in part to the development of its passenger rail network as well as the availability of the automobile as the dominant mode of transport–a similar history has shaped the transport and infrastructure of most major Australian cities. The first rail services began in 1855, 67 years after the settlement's foundation. In 1861, a tram network began, becoming the Southern Hemisphere's largest by the 1920s. This rail infrastructure allowed working-class suburbs to develop at a large distance from the city centre. In terms of effectiveness and sustainability of public transport, Sydney lagged behind Brisbane and many other cities in a 2017 study by design firm Arcadis, where it was ranked at 51.

== Ticketing ==
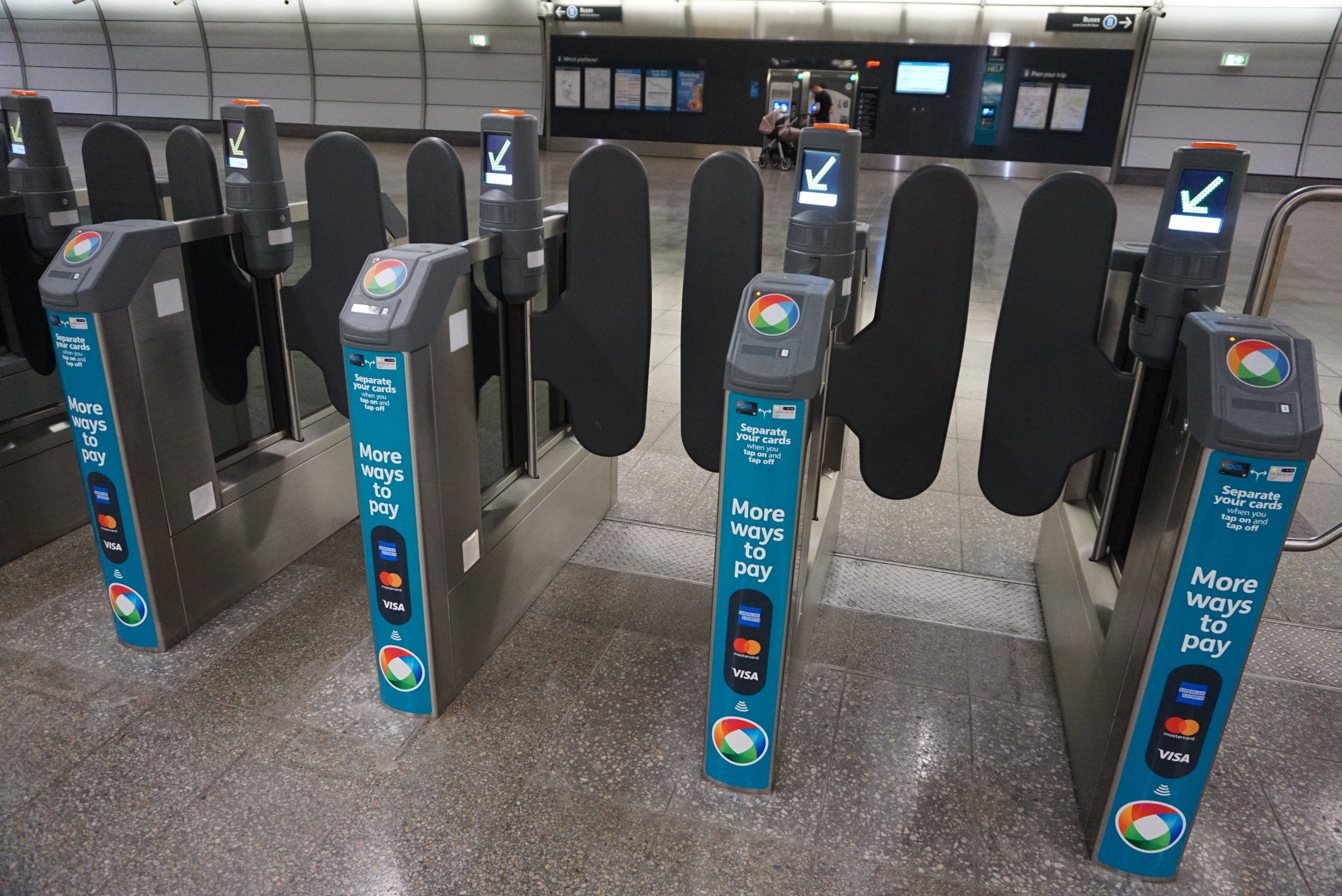
Opal card readers

Transport for NSW public transport services use the Opal ticketing system. The rollout of this contactless system started in December 2012 and completed in December 2014. The previous generation of ticketing products were withdrawn in August 2016. Fares are set by the Government of New South Wales. As of January 2009, Sydney public transport prices were slightly higher than in other mainland Australian cities.

== Bus ==
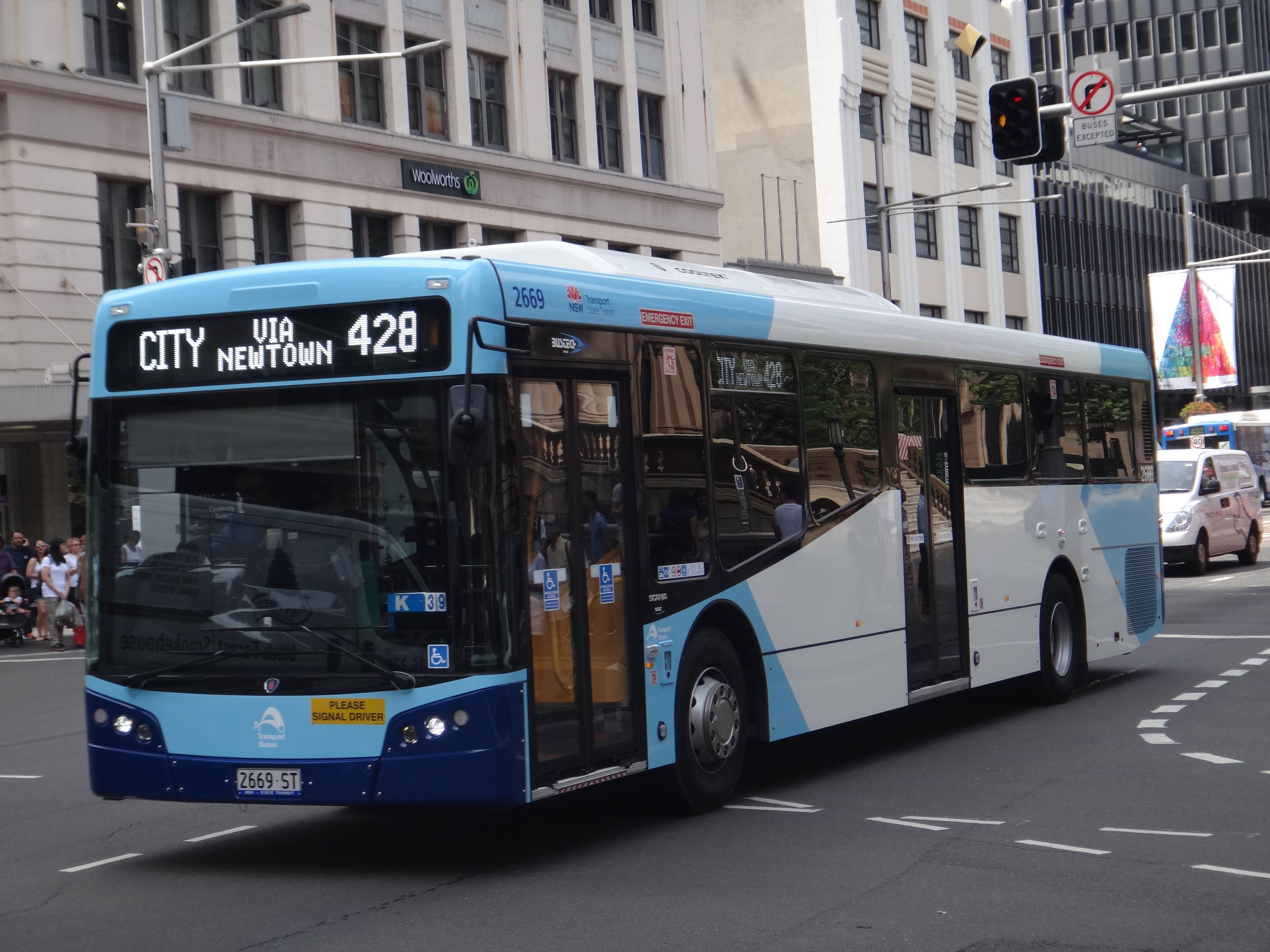
A State Transit Authority bus.

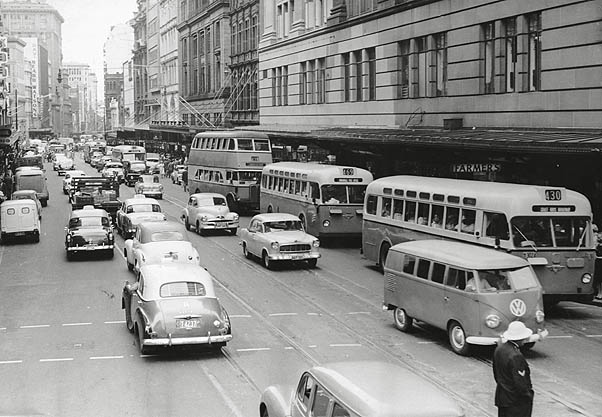
Buses replace trams on George Street, 1962.

Commuter bus services account for about half of the public transport journeys taken in the city on weekdays. Services are provided by private sector operators under contract to Transport for NSW.

The largest private bus operator is CDC NSW. Other significant players include Busways and Transit Systems.

=== Network ===
Sydney's bus network has been divided into different regions. Of these regions, bus routes are classified with three-digit route numbers.

Currently, Sydney has two operating T-Ways:

- The Liverpool-Parramatta T-way opened in 2003
- The North-West T-way opened in 2007

== Rail ==
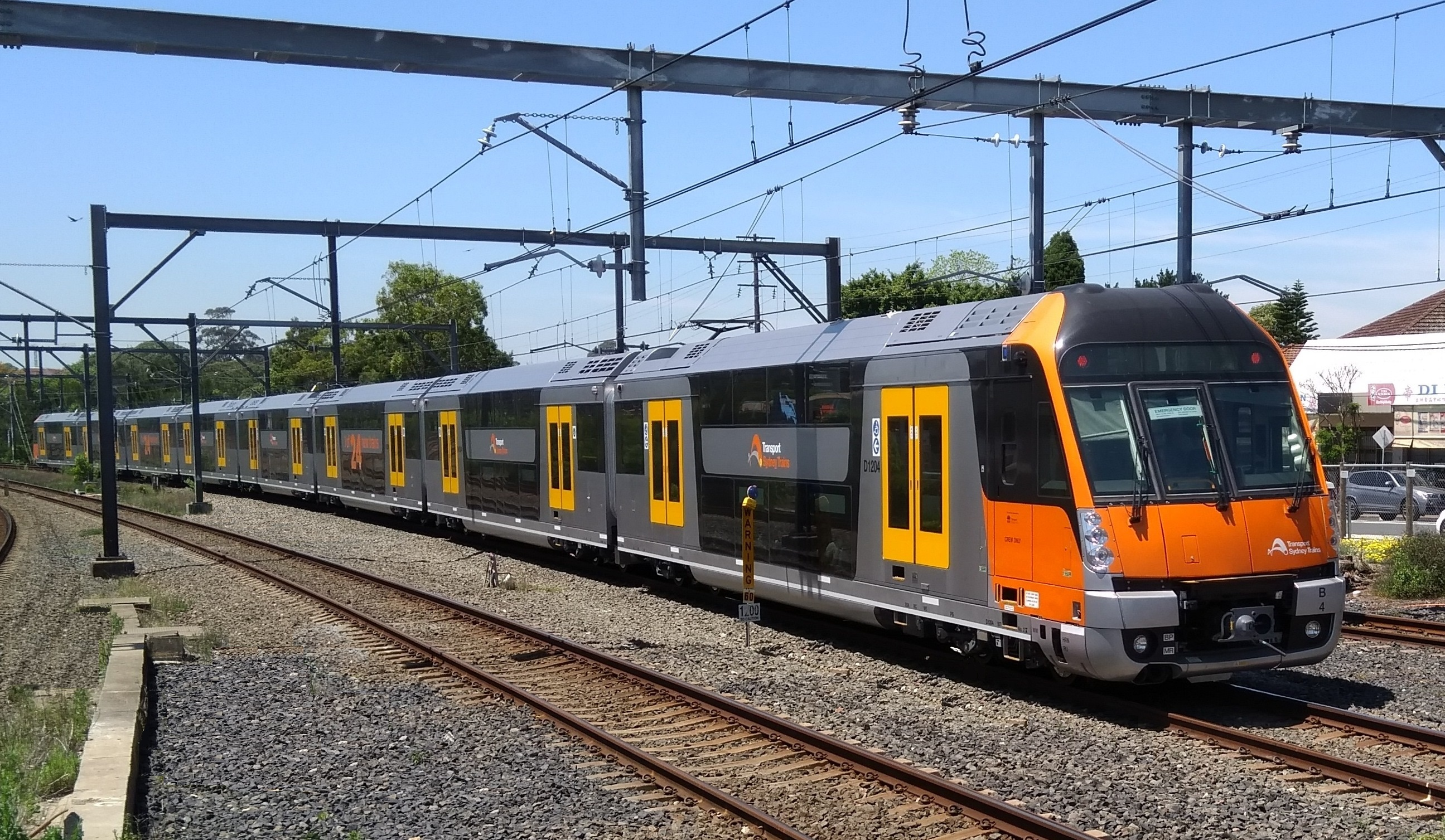
A Sydney Trains B set.

=== Commuter rail ===
Suburban rail services within Sydney are provided by Sydney Trains. Sydney's suburban commuter rail service consists of a complex system of integrated railway lines, of which most run through the city underground. All city trains consist of eight double deck carriages with two crew members on board–driver and guard. Fares are calculated on the basis of distance travelled. Trains run from 4am until around 1am seven days a week with Nightride bus services covering the network throughout the night when trains are not operating.

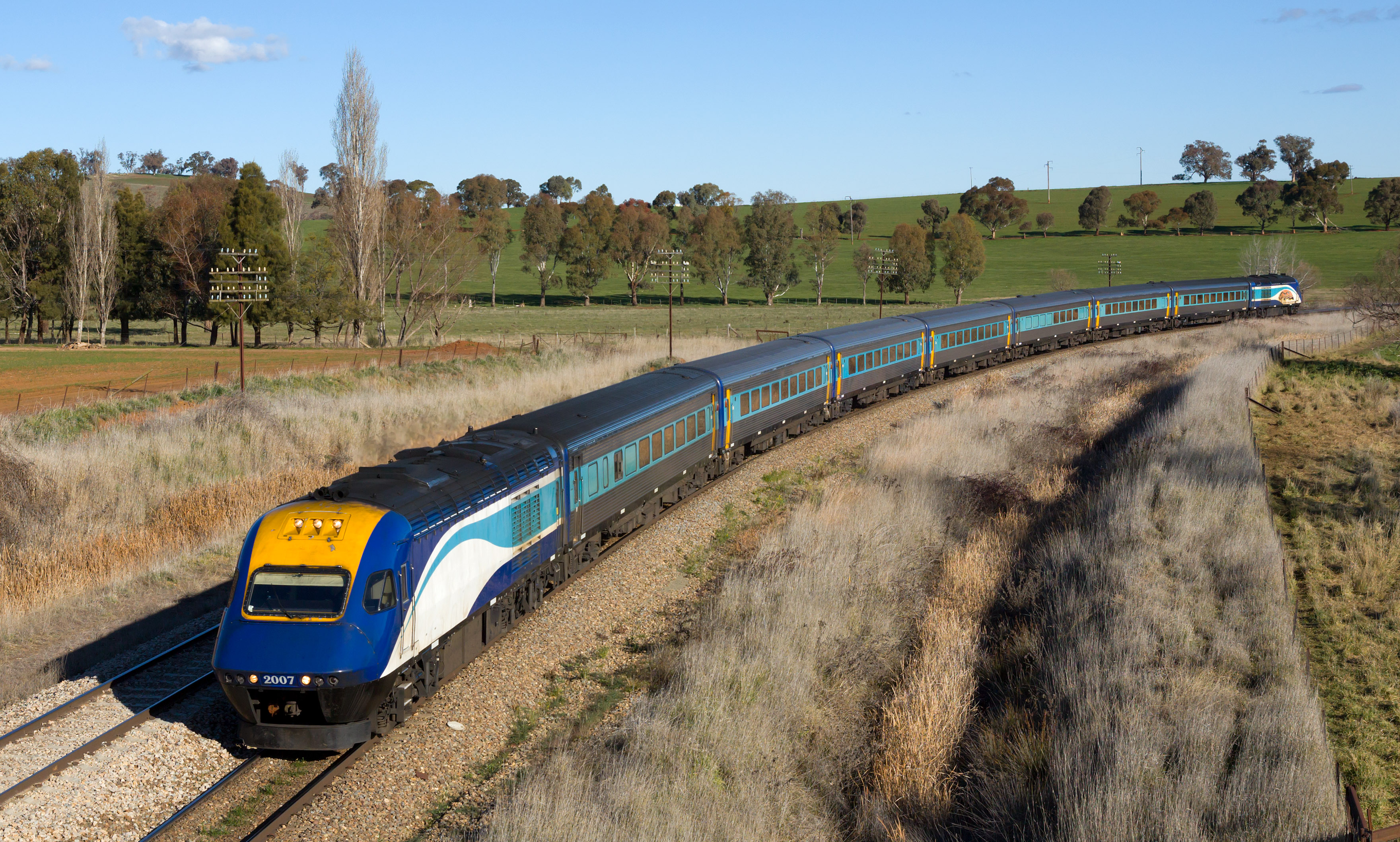
An XPT long-distance train operated by NSW TrainLink

NSW TrainLink interurban trains operate from Central railway station to the Illawarra, Southern Highlands, Blue Mountains, Central Coast and Newcastle. This station is also the terminus for NSW TrainLink's long-distance trains to numerous destinations in country New South Wales as well as Melbourne and Brisbane. The Indian Pacific also operates to Adelaide and Perth.

=== Rapid transit (metro) ===
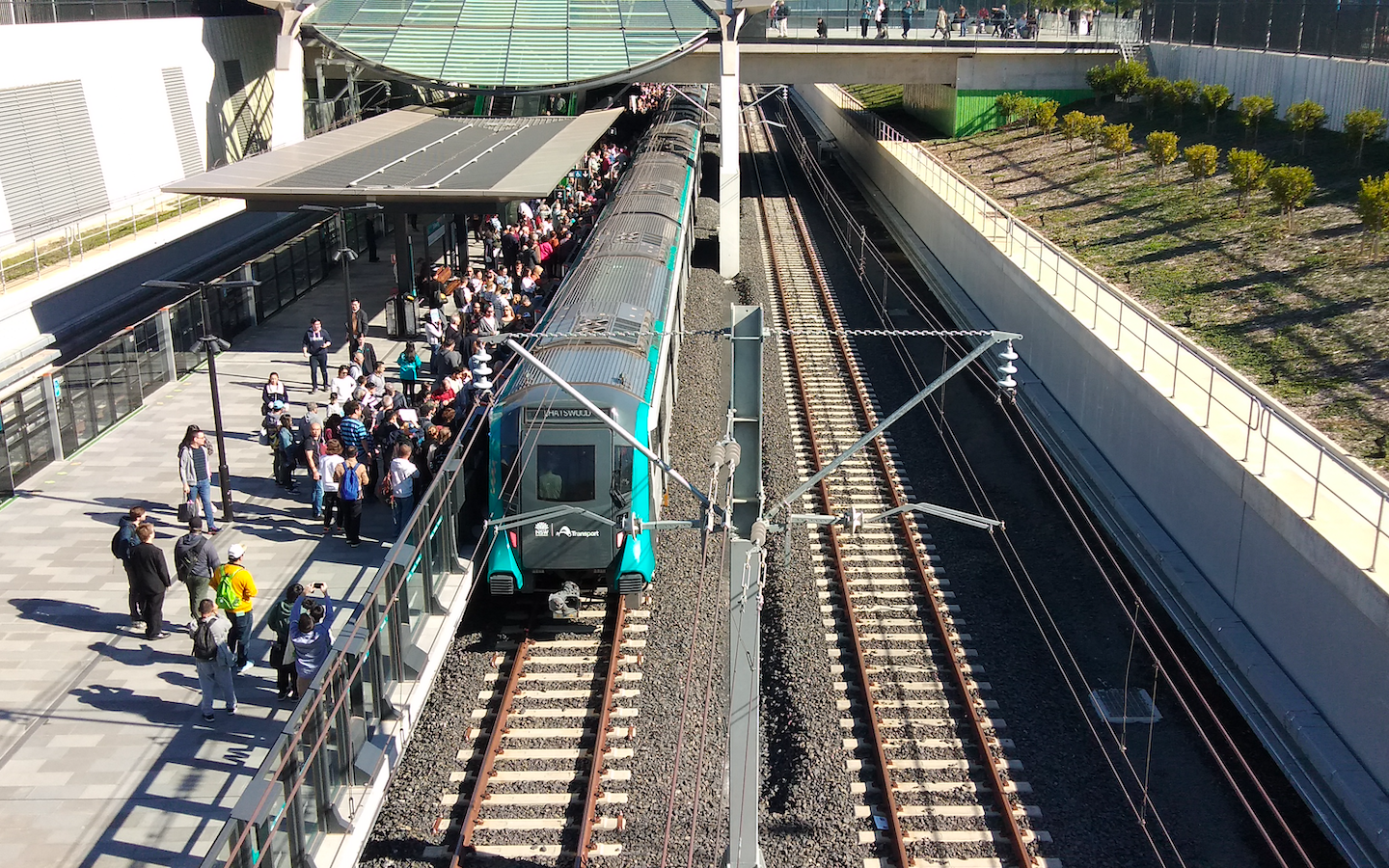
A fully automated Alstom Metropolis train on the Sydney Metro system.

Sydney Metro consists presently of one rapid transit line that opened in stages from 2019 to 2026 and runs from Tallawong on Sydney's north-western suburbs to Bankstown, via the central business district. Government approval for what was initially known as the North West Rail Link, Sydney's first underground metro, was given in 2013. With the opening of the third phase of the line, it consists of 66 km (41.0 mi) of twin track and 31 stations in total. Sydney is the first and currently the only Australian city with a fully automated rapid transit metro system.

=== Freight ===
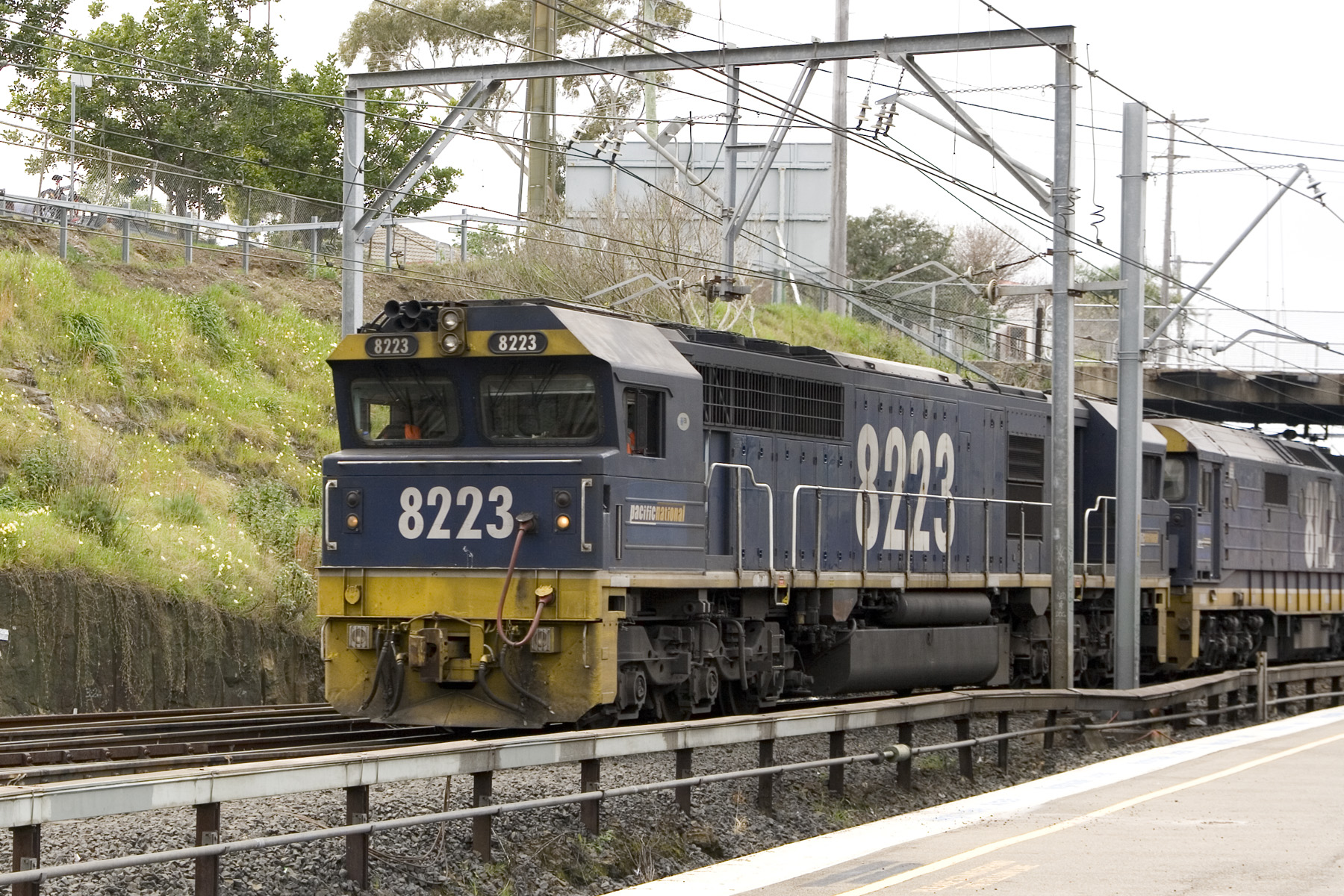
A Pacific National freight train

Freight services operate over most of the suburban railway lines in Sydney, however due to the high frequency of passenger services and the lack of freight only tracks, there is a curfew on freight movements during peak hours.

The major interstate freight routes are the Main Southern and Main North lines, with the Illawarra and Main Western lines serving lineside industries and as alternate interstate routes. In the inner city area the Metropolitan Goods line connects major freight terminals to the main passenger lines and the Southern Sydney Freight Line which runs parallel to the Main South line from the western end of the Metropolitan Goods lines to a point beyond the end of suburban services.

The Northern Sydney Freight Corridor was completed in 2016. This was a series of projects along the Main Northern line between Sydney and Newcastle aimed at increasing the number of freight trains operating along the route.

The main traffic is containerised freight. The main intermodal terminals are at Enfield, Moorebank, Yennora and Minto. Interstate trains to Sydney terminals are up to 1,500 metres long. Short-haul container trains from the terminals to the Port Botany seaport are around 600 metres long. Coal services to Port Kembla are another major traffic. Freight operators include Aurizon, Crawfords Freightlines, Southern Shorthaul Railroad, Pacific National, Qube Holdings and SCT Logistics.

=== Trams and light rail ===
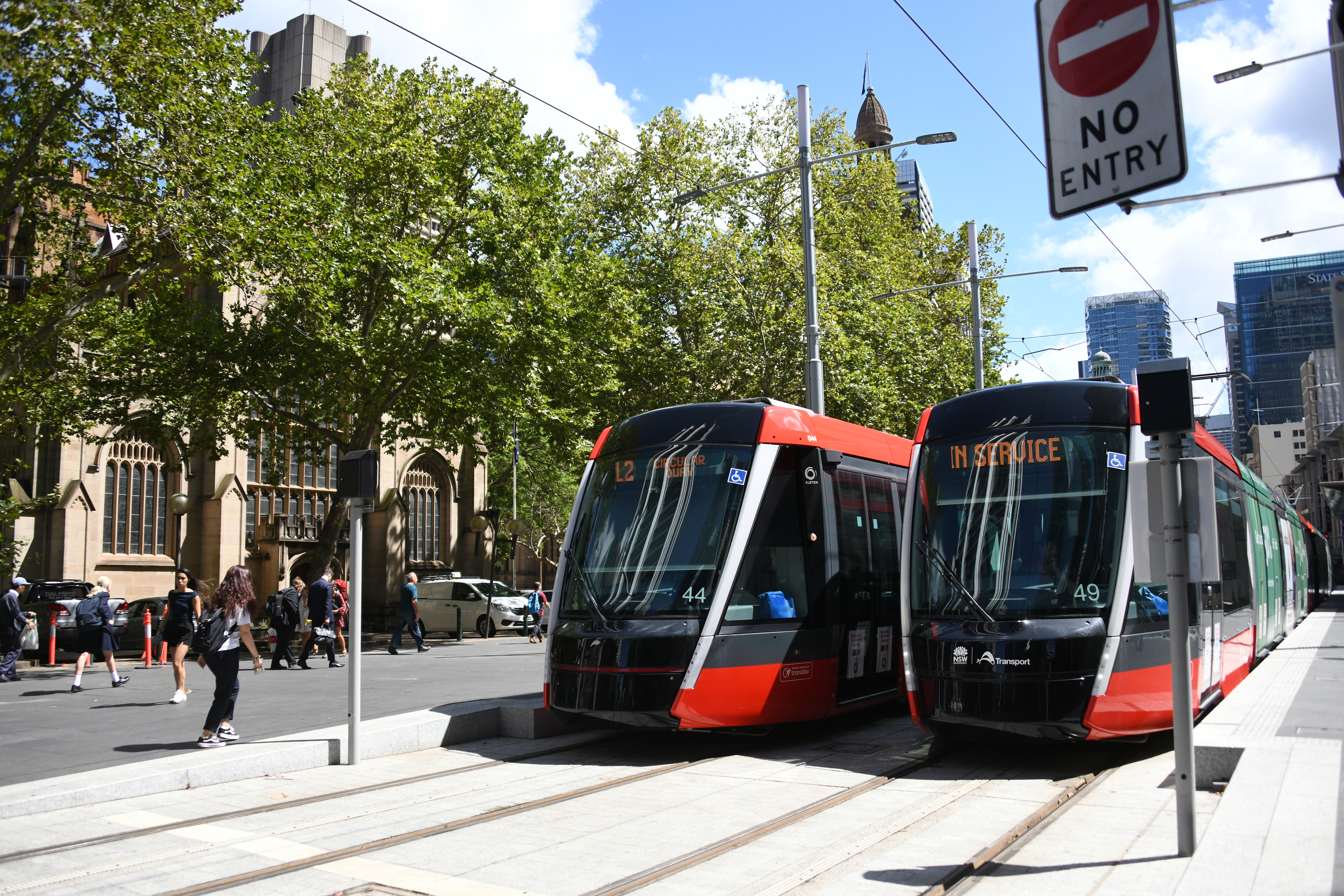
Light rail in the city centre

Sydney once had the Southern Hemisphere's largest tram network. Patronage peaked in 1945 at 405 million passenger journeys. The system was in place from 1861 until its winding down in the 1950s and closure in 1961. It had a maximum street mileage of 291 km (181 miles) in 1923. A short heritage tramway operated by the Sydney Tramway Museum has linked Loftus railway station and the Royal National Park since the 1990s.

In 1997, the Inner West Light Rail line between Central and Pyrmont opened. The line was extended twice and is now 12.8 km long. The CBD and South East Light Rail, passing through Sydney's CBD from Circular Quay to Randwick and Kingsford opened in stages between December 2019 and April 2020.

The Parramatta Light Rail runs from Westmead station to Carlingford via Parramatta, reusing part of the old single tracked Carlingford line. The line opened on 20 December 2024. A second line is proposed to branch from Camelia to Carter Street, Lidcombe via Sydney Olympic Park. The Parramatta light rail lines will have no connection to the Inner West light rail or the CBD and South East light rail lines.

=== Punctuality ===
The punctuality of Sydney's rail network has been praised in the past, with an April 2017 news report noting that "the punctuality of intercity trains lags behind suburban trains".

== Ferry ==
=== Sydney Ferries ===
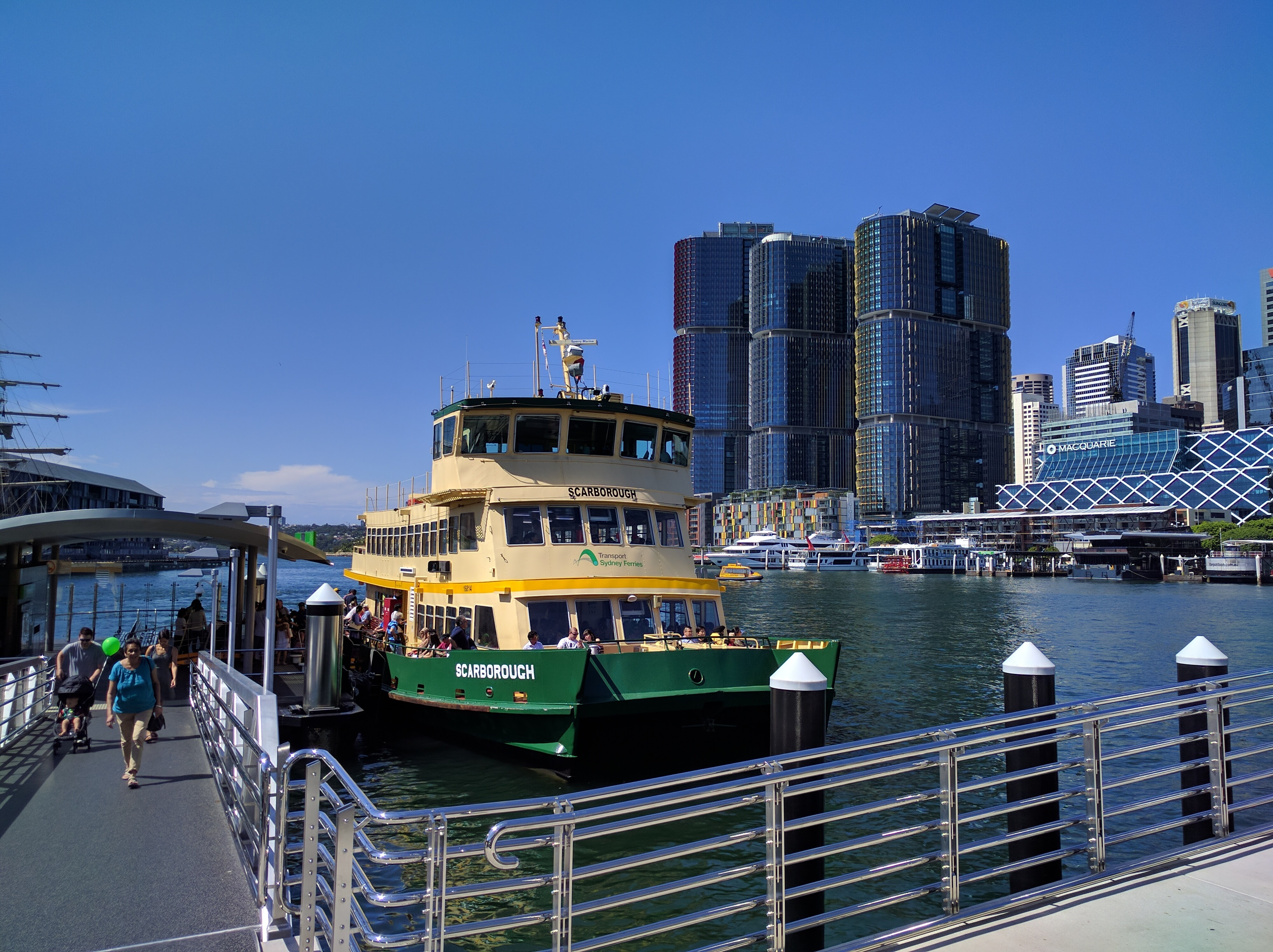
Sydney Ferry at Pyrmont Bay

Sydney Ferries runs numerous commuter and tourist ferries on Sydney Harbour and the Parramatta River. Harbour ferries are used in equal measure by commuter and leisure users. Parramatta River ferries are overwhelmingly used for leisure and tourist trips. Sydney Ferries operates nine routes, with approximately 14 million passengers per year.

Sydney Ferries operates from Circular Quay, a major transport hub in Sydney central business district, with popular routes including services to Manly and Taronga Zoo, a major tourist attraction. Sydney Ferries also operates sightseeing cruises for tourists.

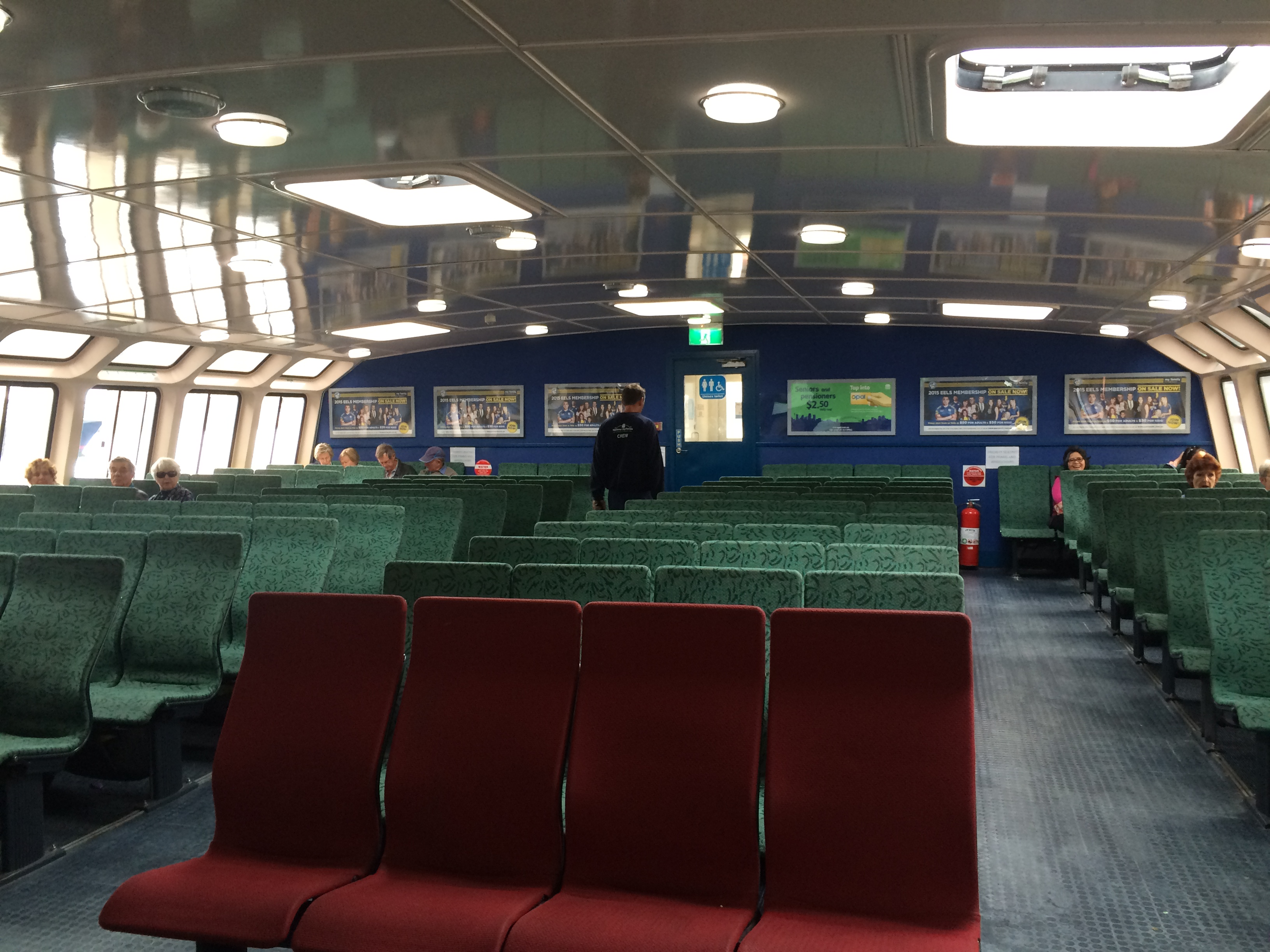
The interior of a RiverCat ferry

=== Other passenger ferry operators ===
Several private sector companies run passenger ferries in the Sydney region. These include:

- Church Point Ferry, from Church Point to Scotland Island
- Cronulla & National Park Ferry Cruises, from Cronulla to Bundeena
- Dangar Island Ferries, from Brooklyn to Dangar Island
- Captain Cook Cruises, from Circular Quay to Darling Harbour, Lane Cove River and hop On/Hop Off loop service to Taronga Zoo, Watsons Bay, etc.
- Palm Beach Ferry, from Palm Beach to Great Mackerel Beach and the Basin, and to Ettalong Beach and Wagstaffe
- Palm Beach & Hawkesbury River Cruises, from Palm Beach to Patonga

=== Vehicle ferries ===
Several car ferries form part of Sydney's road system. These ferries are controlled by a combination of Transport for NSW and local government, and are toll-free. They include:

- Berowra Waters Ferry, across Berowra Creek
- Lower Portland Ferry, across the Hawkesbury River
- Mortlake Ferry, across the Parramatta River
- Webbs Creek Ferry, across the Hawkesbury River
- Wisemans Ferry, across the Hawkesbury River
- Sackville Ferry, across the Hawkesbury River

== Roads ==
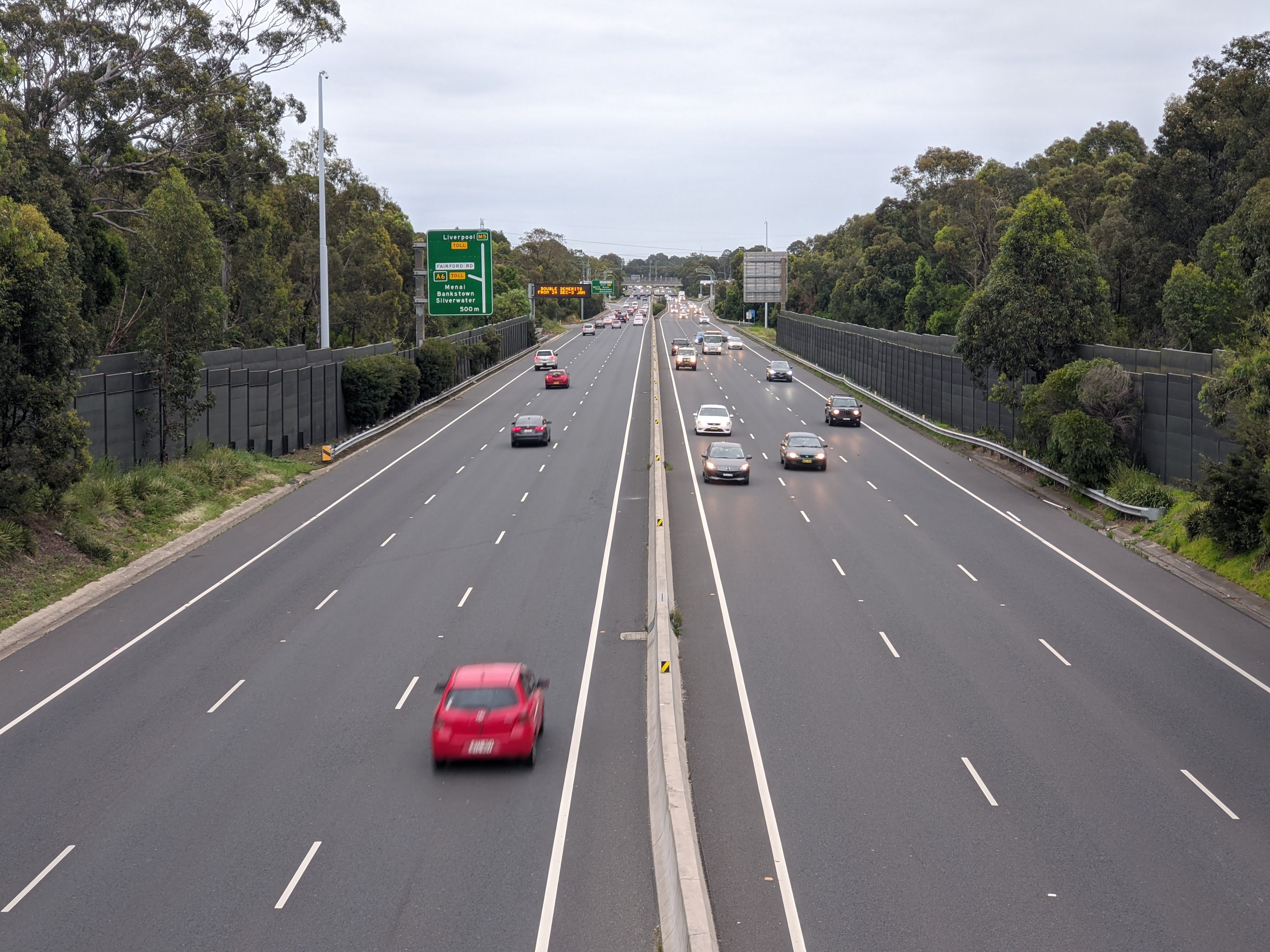
The M5 Motorway

In Sydney, an expansive network of various motorways and roads play a substantial and fundamental role, spurred by a high reliance on motoring as a means of transport. Collectively, 160 kilometres of motorways, freeways and tolled roads serve the Greater Sydney area and on average, the majority of households rely on at least 1 or 2 cars as a means of transport. Despite this high reliance on roads, Sydney maintains the highest rate of usage of public transport in Australia. There are a number of past and current proposed roads in Sydney.

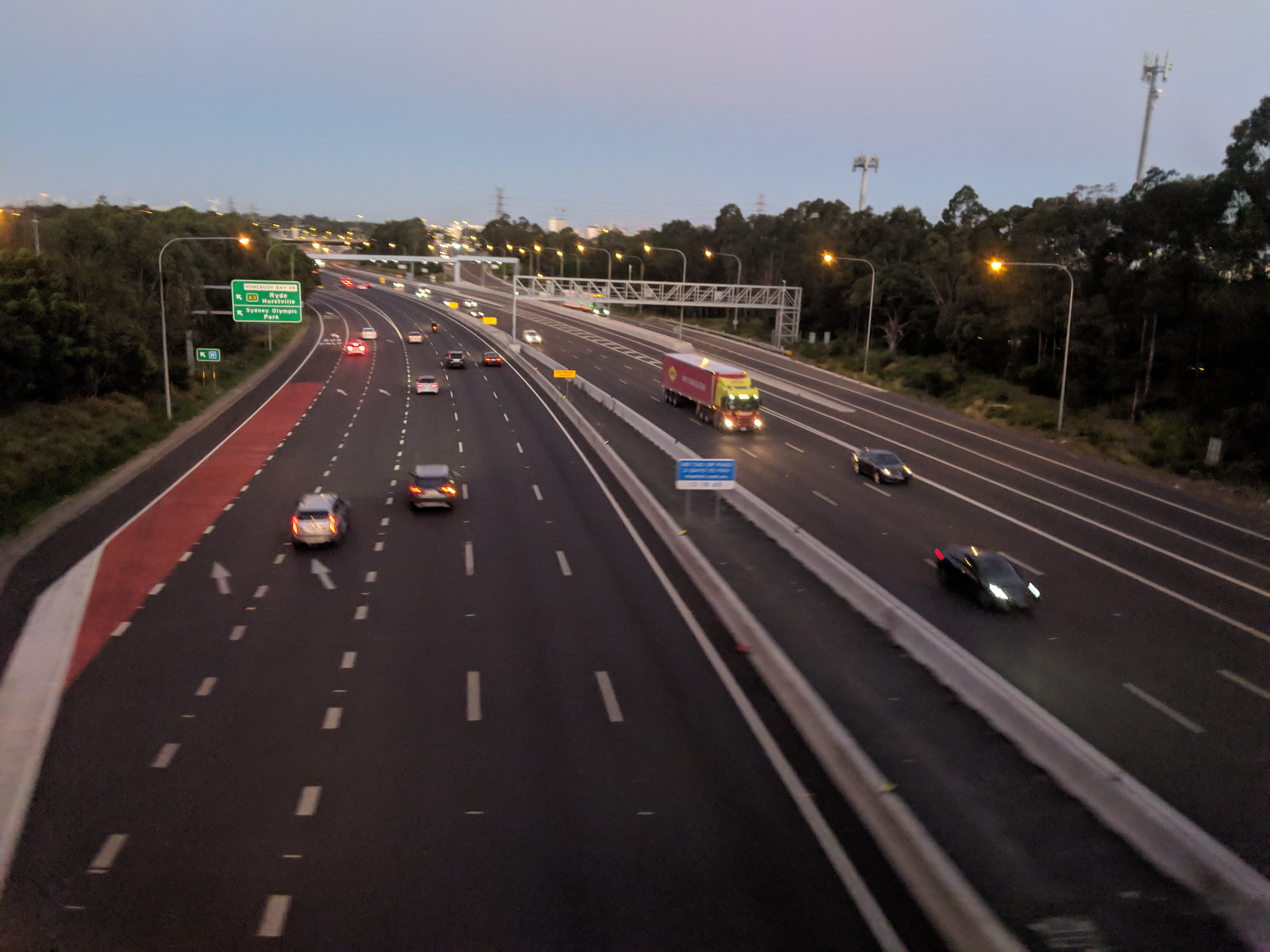
The M4 Motorway in Western Sydney

The highway network in Sydney and the rest of New South Wales, was established in August 1928 when the Country Roads Board superseded the 1924 main road classifications and established the basis of the existing New South Wales main road system. The number of a road for administrative purposes is not the same as the route number it carries. For example, the Great Western Highway is Highway 5 for administrative purposes but is signposted as part of route A32.

While highways in many other countries are typically identified by number, highways in Australia, including New South Wales, are known mostly by names. These names typically come from 19th-century explorers, important politicians or geographic regions.

Major motorways and highways serving Greater Sydney include:

- Eastern Distributor
- Western Distributor
- Southern Cross Drive
- General Holmes Drive
- M1 Pacific Motorway
- M2 Hills Motorway
- M4 Motorway
- M5 Motorway
- M6 Motorway
- Westlink M7
- M8 Motorway
- Lane Cove Tunnel
- Gore Hill Freeway
- Warringah Freeway
- WestConnex
- NorthConnex
- Sydney Harbour Tunnel (or Sydney Harbour Bridge and Cahill Expressway)
- Western Harbour Tunnel (under construction)

=== Freight ===
There are prohibited goods for transporting hazardous road freight in the Sydney metropolitan area.

During the construction of the Southern Arterial Route criticism was raised on the practice of transporting dangerous goods using surface streets instead of tunnels. When a citizen's advocate suggested to a resident that surface roads were preferred for trucks over confined tunnels in case of a crash, the resident replied "so it's all right if it happens outside our homes rather than in their tunnels, so it's our problem not theirs. What kind of logic is that?".

== Cycling ==
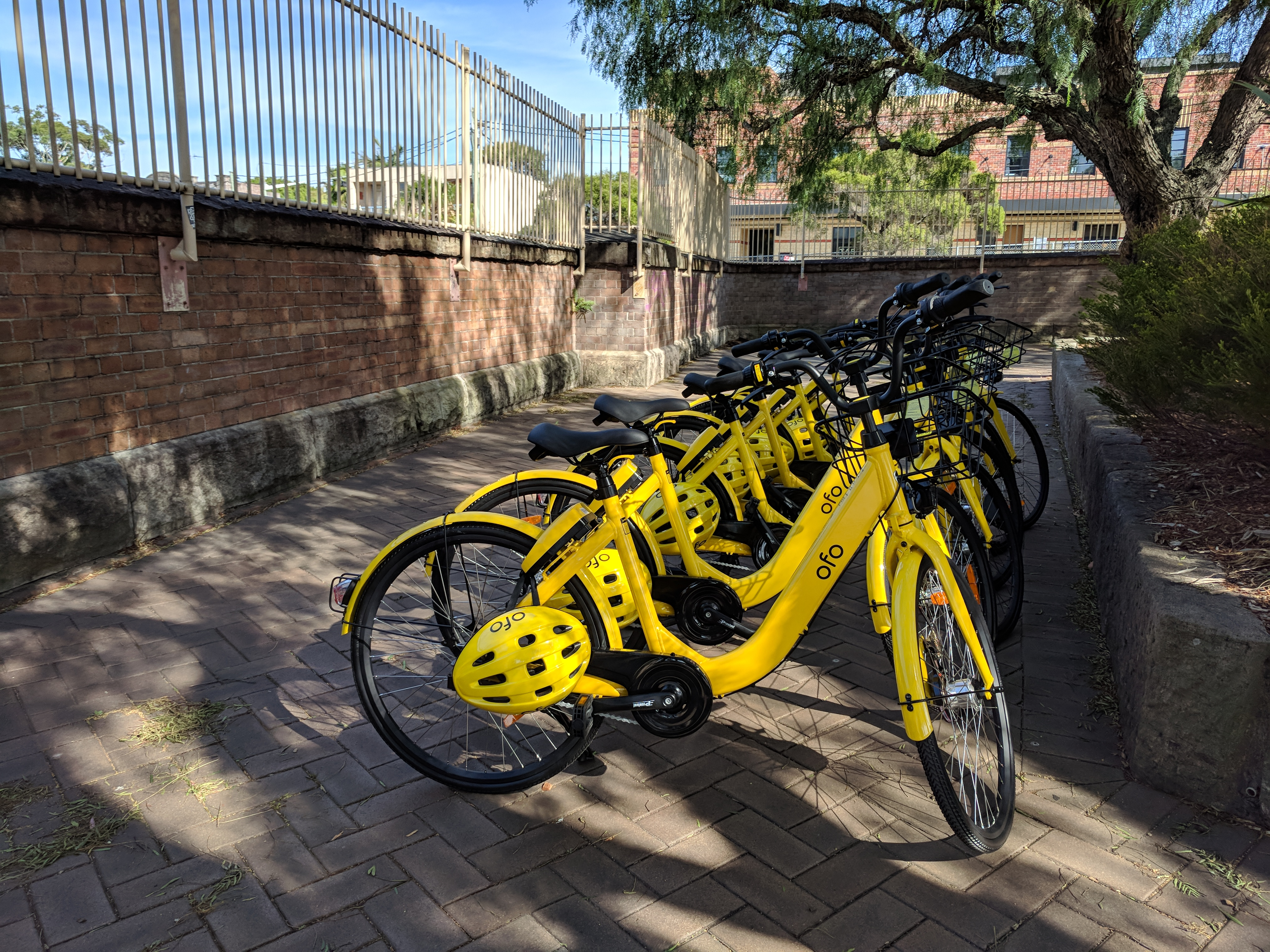
Ofo rental bikes near St Peters station

Cycling in Sydney, New South Wales, Australia takes place for recreation, commuting and as a sport. Sydney has a hilly topography and so may require a slightly higher level of fitness from cyclists than flatter cities such as Melbourne and Canberra. Sydney depends heavily on motor vehicles where traffic and public transport operate at capacity. This means that cyclist are often competing with motorists for limited space on busier roads, and for limited government resources for expenditure on road infrastructure.

In its favour, Sydney has a generally mild climate and there are active cycling groups. For the most part, cyclists ride on the road with motor vehicles. Current regulations only permit cyclists under 16 years old to ride on the footpath.

Historically, bicycle infrastructure was largely constructed in areas for recreational riding or along shared paths such as in parks. Prior to the involvement of Jan Gehl, the City of Sydney created a Bicycle Action Plan in 2007, part of which involved building physically separated cycleways. In May 2009, the first of these, a 200m stretch along King Street in the CBD opened.

== Taxis ==
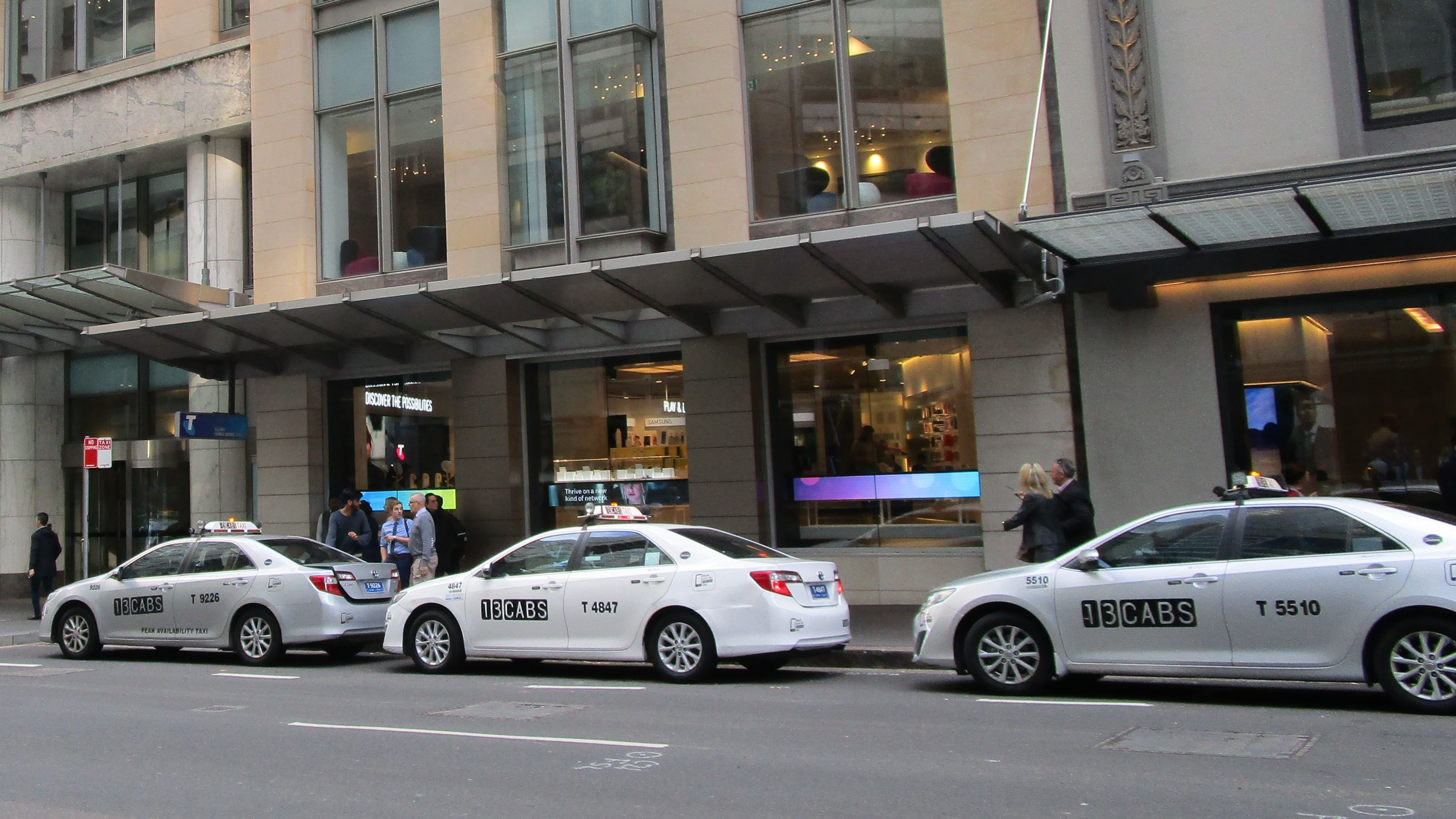
A queue of taxis in the Sydneys CBD

Sydney and the surrounding areas of New South Wales are served by around 6,000 taxis. In 2004, the industry employed over 22,700 taxi drivers, the largest number of taxis and drivers in Australia.

In general, individual taxis are owned by small-scale operators who pay membership fees to regional or citywide radio communication networks. These networks provide branding as well as telephone and internet booking services to operators and drivers.

Fares are set by the Independent Pricing and Regulatory Tribunal of New South Wales (IPART). Other aspects of the industry are regulated by the Transport for NSW and the Roads & Maritime Services. The industry plays a self-regulating role through the New South Wales Taxi Council.

Vehicle operators are represented by the New South Wales Taxi Industry Association and, in country New South Wales, by the New South Wales Country Operators Association. Drivers are represented by the New South Wales Taxi Drivers Association. The New South Wales Transport Workers Union purports to represent taxi drivers. Most regional centres have a local taxi network.

== Airports ==
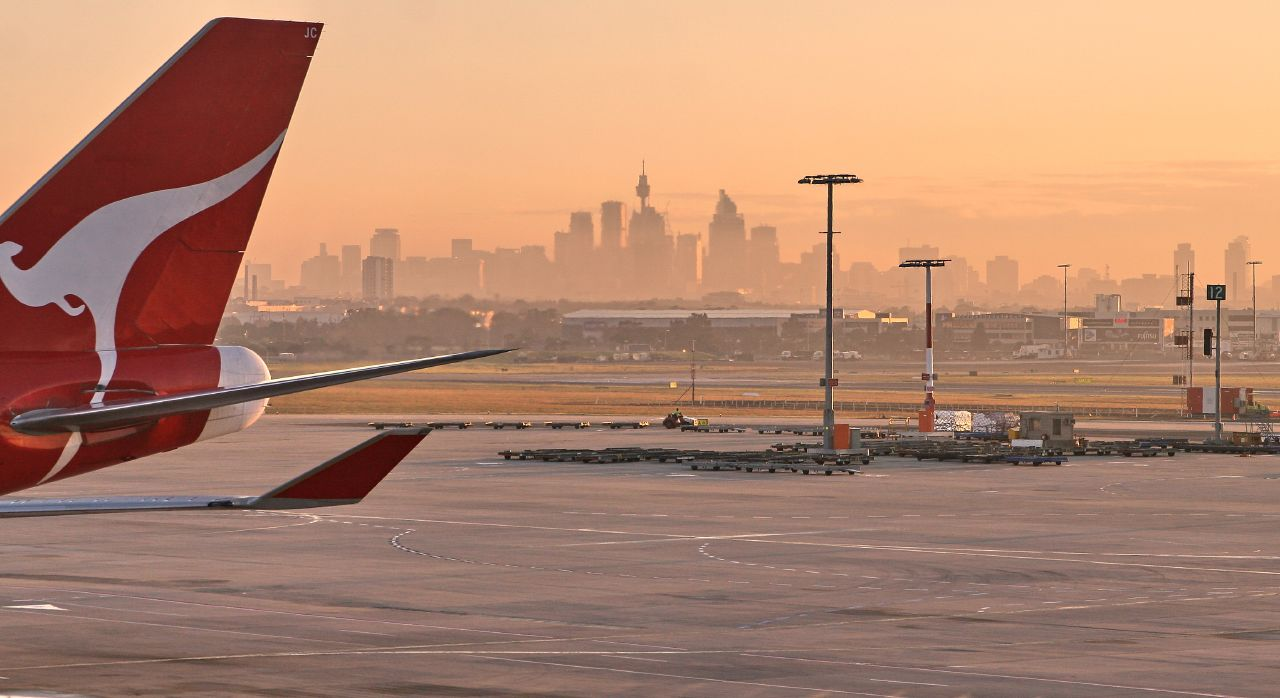
Sydney Airport is in close proximity to the CBD

Sydney is primarily served by Sydney Airport, the busiest airport in Australia, serving up to 43 million international and domestic passengers on an annual basis. The airport is located eight kilometres from Sydney's city centre. An ever growing number of travellers passing through Sydney Airport has ultimately stressed its capacity, and subsequently, investment and construction for the new Western Sydney Airport in Badgerys Creek has taken place.

The Greater Sydney region is also served by smaller domestic airports such as Bankstown Airport and Camden Airport which serve short distance and recreational flights from regional areas.

== Public transport statistics ==
A map showing the percentage of the employed population who travel to work by bus only, in the Australian Census 2011.

A map showing the percentage of the employed population who travel to work by train only, in the 2011 census

A map showing the percentage of the employed population who travel to work by ferry only, in the Australian Census 2011.

In 2017, the average amount of time people spend commuting with public transport in Sydney on a weekday was 82 minutes. 31% of public transit riders, ride for more than 2 hours every day. The average amount of time people wait at a stop or station for public transport is 13 minutes. 18% of riders wait for over 20 minutes on average every day. The average distance people usually ride in a single trip with public transport is 9 km. 21% travel for over 12 km in a single direction.
