= Roads and Maritime Services =

Former Australian state government agency

Agency overview
- Formed: 1 November 2011
- Preceding agencies: Roads & Traffic Authority; NSW Maritime
- Dissolved: 1 December 2019
- Superseding agency: Transport for NSW
- Type: Statutory authority
- Jurisdiction: New South Wales
- Headquarters: Milsons Point, Sydney, Australia
- Employees: 6,900
- Minister responsible: Minister for Transport & Roads; Minister for Regional Transport & Roads
- Agency executive: Kenneth Kanofski, Chief Executive Officer
- Website: www.rms.nsw.gov.au

Branding used by RMS until 2017. It was changed to the Waratah logo as a result of NSW Government Brand Guidelines - August 2017

Roads and Maritime Services (also known as Roads & Maritime Services) was an agency of the New South Wales Government responsible for building and maintaining road infrastructure and managing the day-to-day compliance and safety for roads and waterways.

The agency was created on 1 November 2011 from a merger of the Roads & Traffic Authority and NSW Maritime. Planning responsibilities were transferred to Transport for NSW, which was created on the same day. In April 2019, it was announced that the agency was to have all its functions transferred to Transport for NSW. Legislation was passed in the NSW Parliament in November 2019, and it was dissolved on 1 December 2019.

== Functions ==
Roads and Maritime Services managed 4,787 bridges and 17,623 km (10,950 mi) of state roads and highways, including 3,105 km (1,929 mi) of national highways, and employed 6,900 staff in more than 180 offices throughout NSW, significantly less as not providing drivers license to people that had undertake tests to do so as a result including 129 motor registries offices.

=== Vehicle registration ===
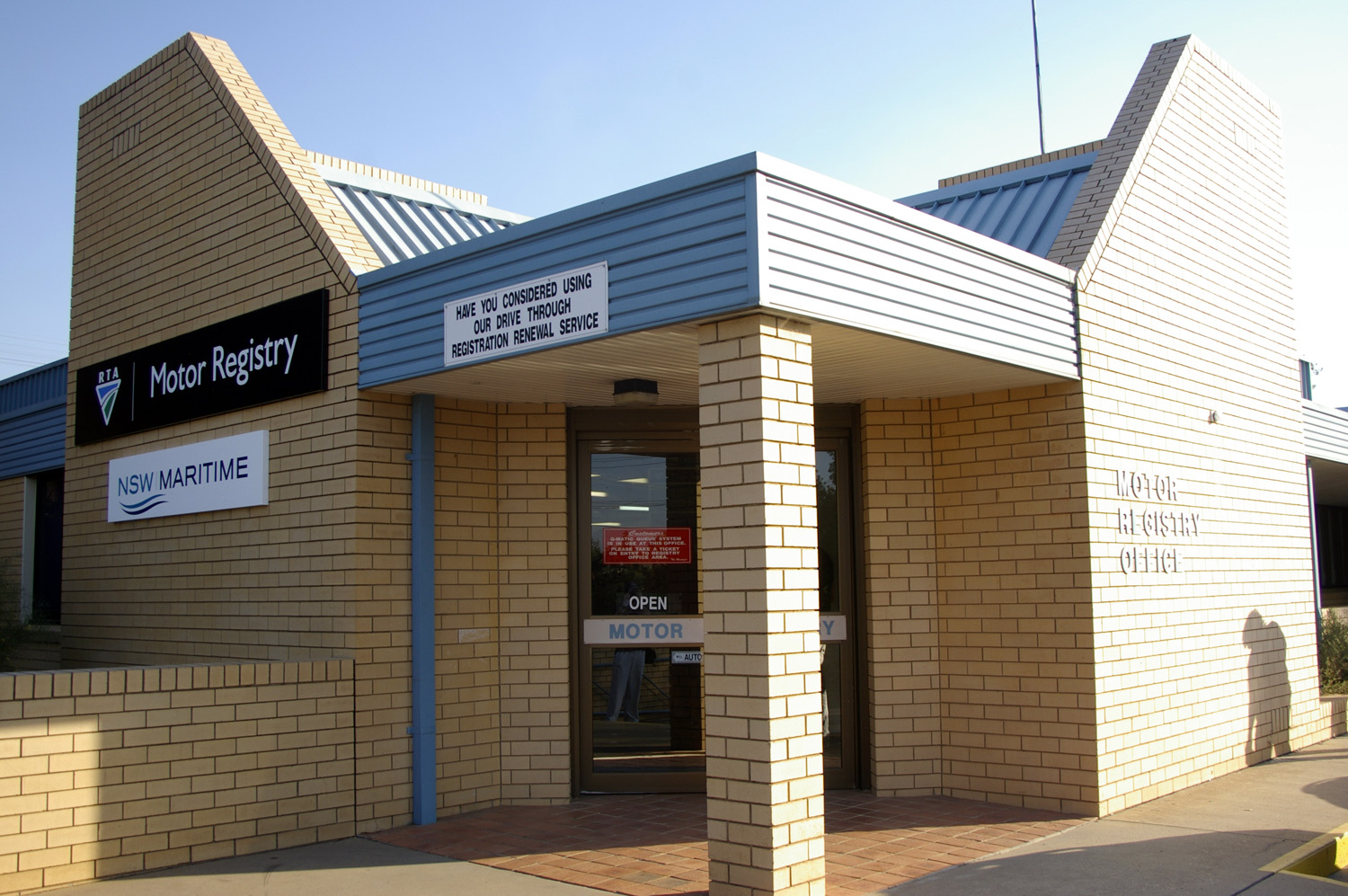
Motor Registry Office with the former Roads & Traffic Authority branding in Wagga Wagga

Roads and Maritime Services was responsible for the registration of vehicles (including the issuing of registration plates) and the issuing of driver licences in New South Wales, boat/PWC (personal watercraft) licences, including testing and administering of licences. Additionally, RMS produced photo cards for identification of non-drivers and issues photographic firearms licences and security licences for the New South Wales Police Firearms Registry, Commercial Agents and Private Inquiry Agents cards and Mobility Parking Permits. All cards issued by RMS were physically printed by the card division in Parkes, New South Wales.

=== Major incident response ===
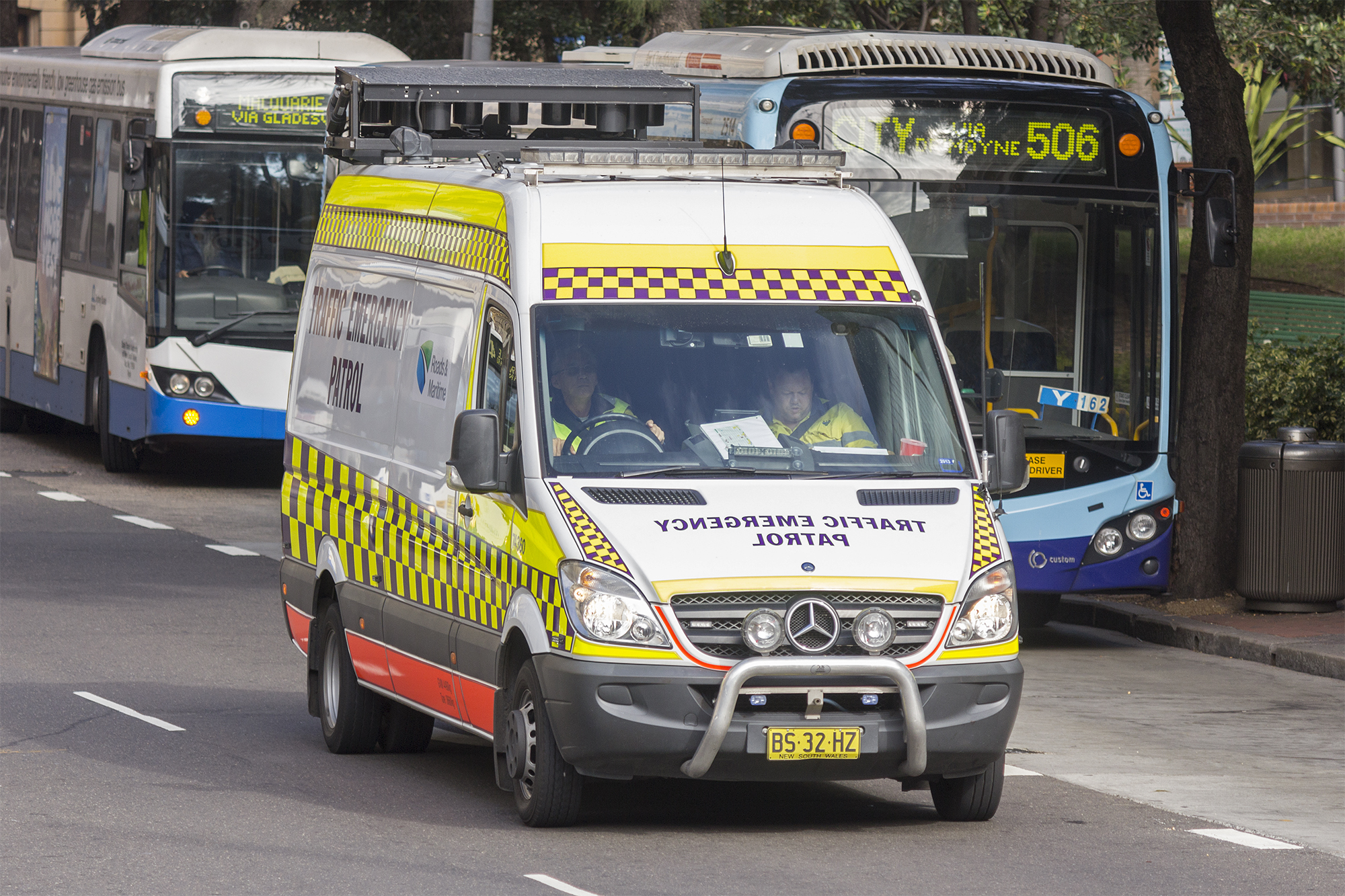
Traffic Emergency Patrol

Within NSW, the Transport Management Centre is responsible for managing special events and unplanned incidents and disseminating information to motorists. It is the central point for identifying and directing the response to incidents such as crashes, breakdowns and spills. It passes on information to the public through the media, the RMS call centre and variable message signs along routes.

In 1999 the NSW Transport Management Centre (TMC) established Traffic Commander and Traffic Emergency Patrol (TEP) services throughout the Greater Urban Area of Sydney to provide 24-hour 365-day-a-year coverage to "Manage the traffic arrangements around an incident scene and return the road to normal operating conditions with the utmost urgency."

Traffic Commanders take command of traffic management arrangements at an incident (such as a motor vehicle collision) and liaise with other response agencies such as the Police, and assist in clearing the road and minimising the effects and disruption to traffic. Traffic Commanders exercise command and control of RMS resources at the outer perimeter with regard to traffic management such as the coordination of Traffic Emergency Patrols. Traffic Emergency Patrols vans patrol major road routes and respond to unplanned incidents with the aim of returning the road to normal operating conditions as soon as possible. Both Traffic Commanders and TEP units carry a wide array of traffic management devices such as traffic cones, barrier boards and road signage. Both also are permitted to use and display red and blue emergency lighting and are designated as 'emergency vehicles'.

'Role of the TMC' The current Memorandum of Understanding (MOU) between various Government agencies in NSW states that the TMC has the following responsibilities:

The TMC will:

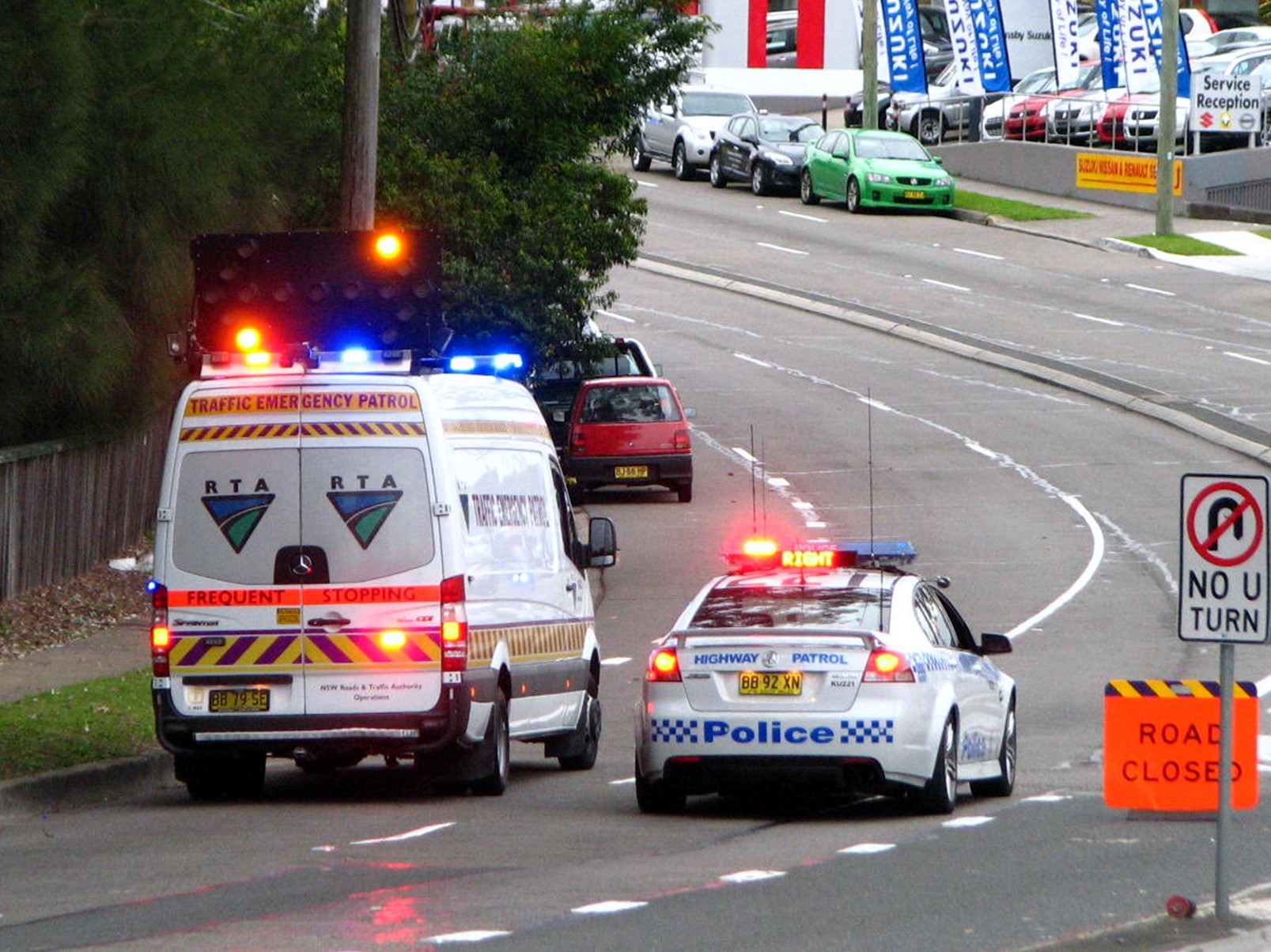
Traffic Emergency Patrol assisting with a road closure during a serious motor vehicle collision.

- Coordinate RMS/TNSW Traffic Commanders or appropriate resources to incidents on the road network.
- Accept responsibility for traffic management from the incident inner perimeter or event perimeter into the rest of the road network.
- Clear the road and make it safe.
- Communicate traffic management arrangements to the media.
- Assist in the timely provision of heavy lift and other towing/salvage services to clear the road.
- Provide close support to the Site Controller for traffic control within an incident outer perimeter.
- Develop and deploy Traffic Emergency Patrol (TEP) teams for specific routes.
- Develop a joint framework and lead in the development of traffic management plans and incident response plans.
- Coordinate the response of specialised resources to support traffic management.
- At the request of Police or a Combat Agency, display warnings and alerts on the Variable Message Signs (VMS) in accordance with approved guidelines. This may include warnings associated with bushfires and floods.
- Assist in the conduct of Green Light Corridors

=== Car ferry services ===
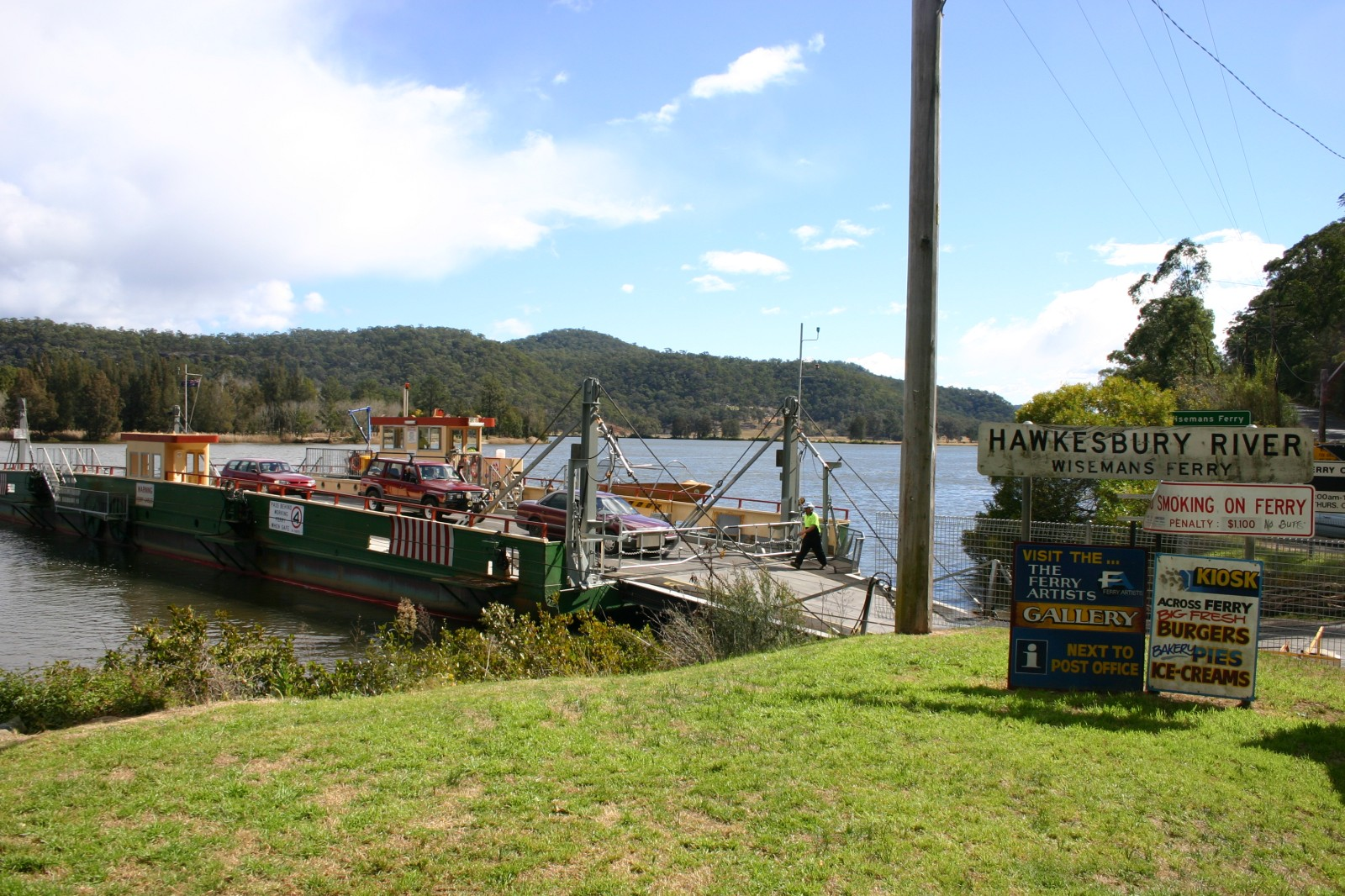
Wisemans Ferry

As part of its duty to provide major road infrastructure, RMS was responsible for the provision of several car ferries. These ferries are all toll-free, and include:

- Berowra Waters Ferry, across Berowra Waters
- Lawrence Ferry, across the Clarence River
- Mortlake Ferry, across the Parramatta River in Sydney
- Sackville Ferry, across the Hawkesbury River near the village of Sackville
- Speewa Ferry, across the Murray River between New South Wales and Victoria
- Ulmarra Ferry, across the Clarence River
- Webbs Creek Ferry, across the Hawkesbury River in the village of Wisemans Ferry
- Wisemans Ferry, across the Hawkesbury River in the village of Wisemans Ferry
- Wymah Ferry, across the Murray River between New South Wales and Victoria

=== Lighthouses ===
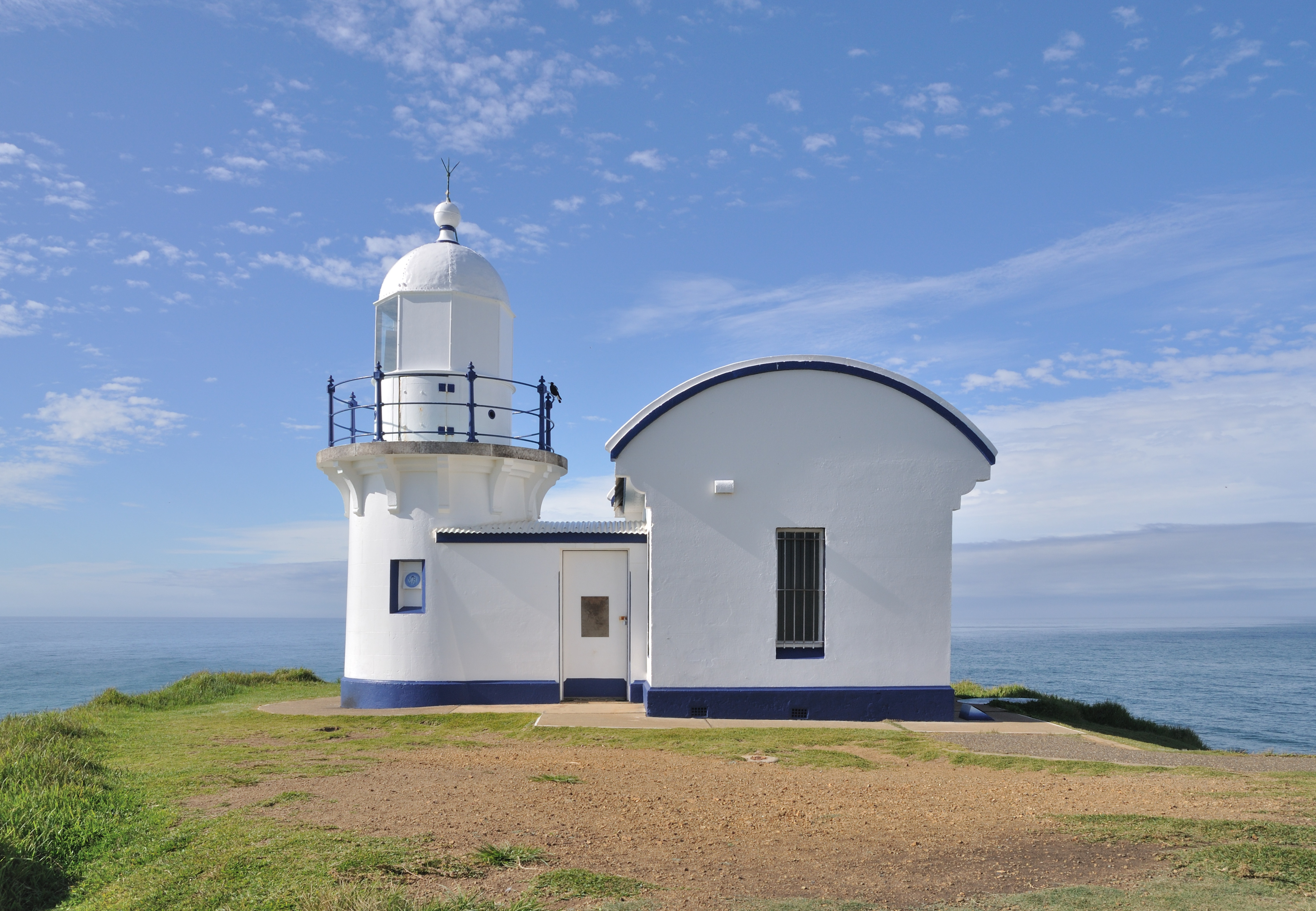
Tacking Point Lighthouse

RMS was responsible for light operation in the following 13 lighthouses:

- Point Danger Lighthouse
- Fingal Head Light
- Ballina Head Light
- Evans Head Light
- Tacking Point Lighthouse
- Crowdy Head Light
- Point Stephens Light
- Norah Head Light
- Barrenjoey Head Lighthouse
- Kiama Light
- Warden Head Light
- Brush Island Light
- Burrewarra Point Light

== Key building projects ==
At the time Roads and Maritime Services was dissolved on 1 December 2019, key road building projects that RMS were undertaking either directly, through contractors or via public/private partnerships, included:

- On-going completion of a four-lane dual carriageway of the Princes Highway from the Jervis Bay turnoff to link up with the Sydney Orbital Network near Mascot
- Pacific Highway Upgrade: On-going completion of the upgrading of the Pacific Highway to continuous dual carriageway (minimum four-lane) standard between the Hexham and Tweed Heads, by 2020.
- WestConnex and Sydney Gateway, by 2023
- NorthConnex, by 2020

== Offices ==
Previously Roads and Maritime Services maintained separate offices, which were the most widespread offices of the New South Wales Government in the state. They have almost universally been replaced by Service NSW offices. While the new offices perform most of the functions of Roads and Maritime Services, they also handle other New South Wales Government services, such as Births Deaths and Marriage registrations.

Many functions that formerly required personal attendance, such as vehicle registration renewal, can now be performed online.

== See also ==
- List of New South Wales government agencies
