= Mortlake Ferry =

Cable ferry in Sydney

Coordinates: 33.83646°S 151.107314°E

The Mortlake Ferry, also known as the Putney Punt, is a cable ferry that runs across the Parramatta River in Sydney, New South Wales, Australia. It connects Hilly Street in Mortlake and Pellisier Road in Putney.

== History and heritage ==
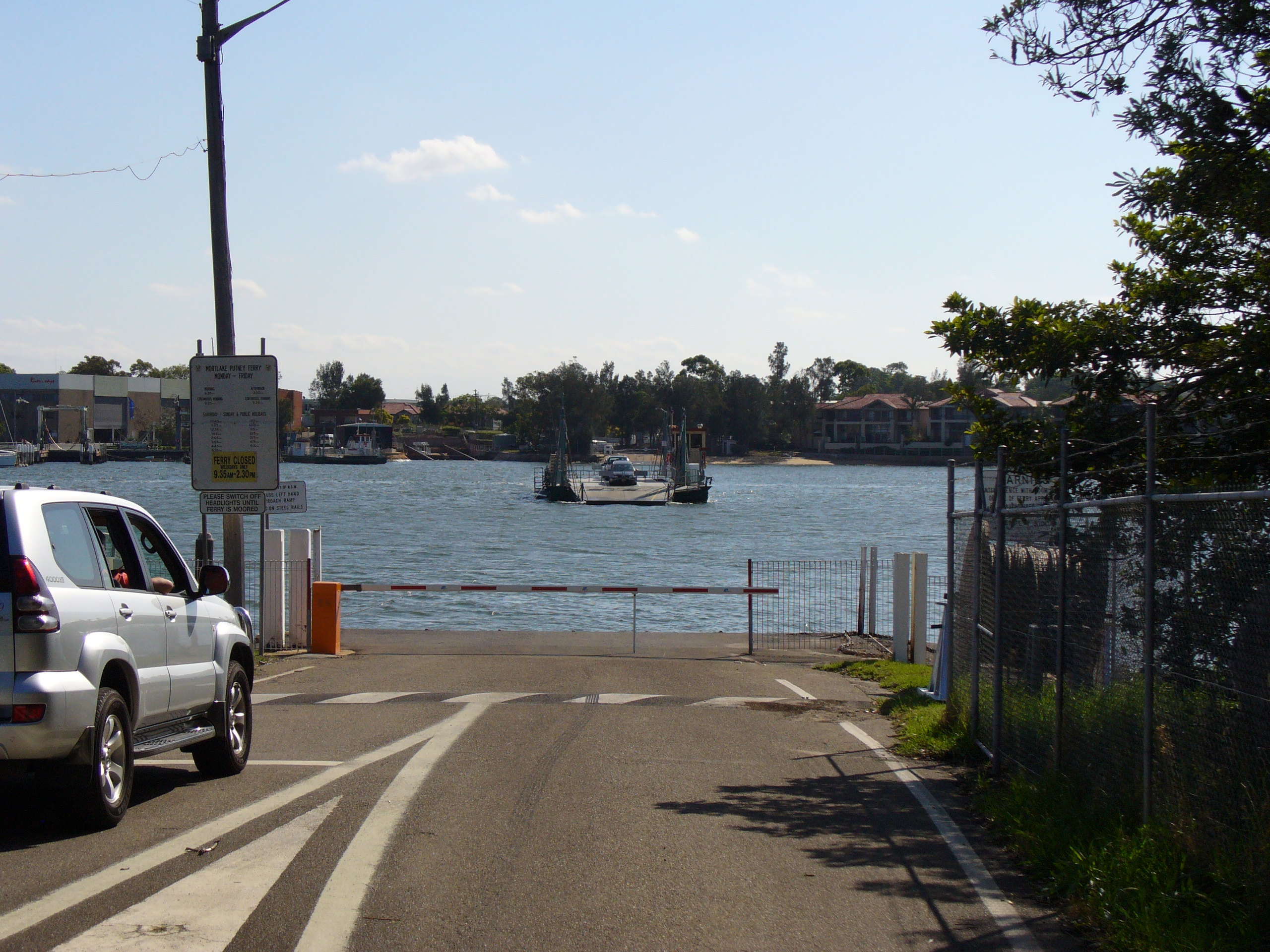
The Putney approach to the Mortlake Ferry

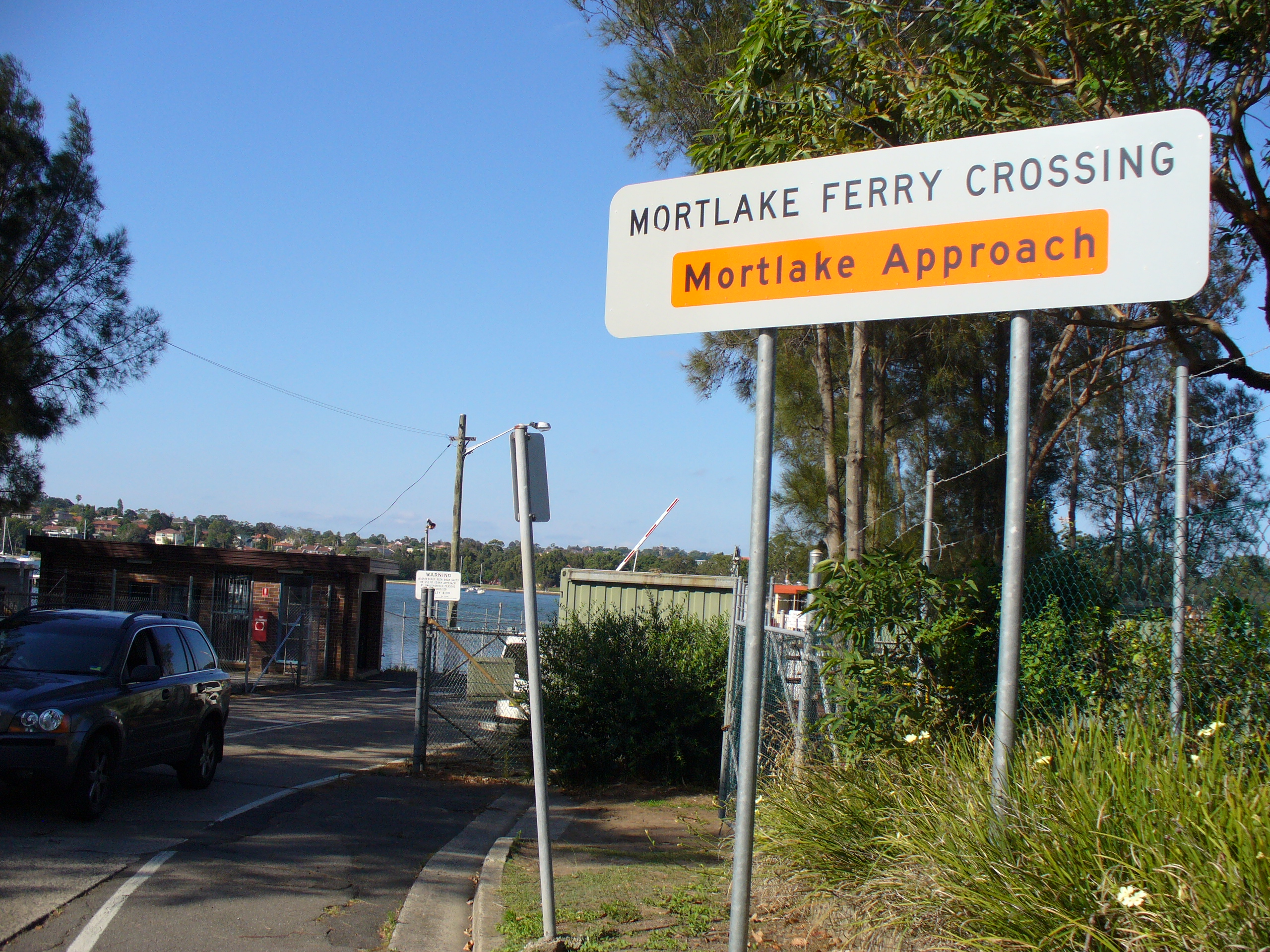
Sign announcing the Mortlake approach to the Ferry

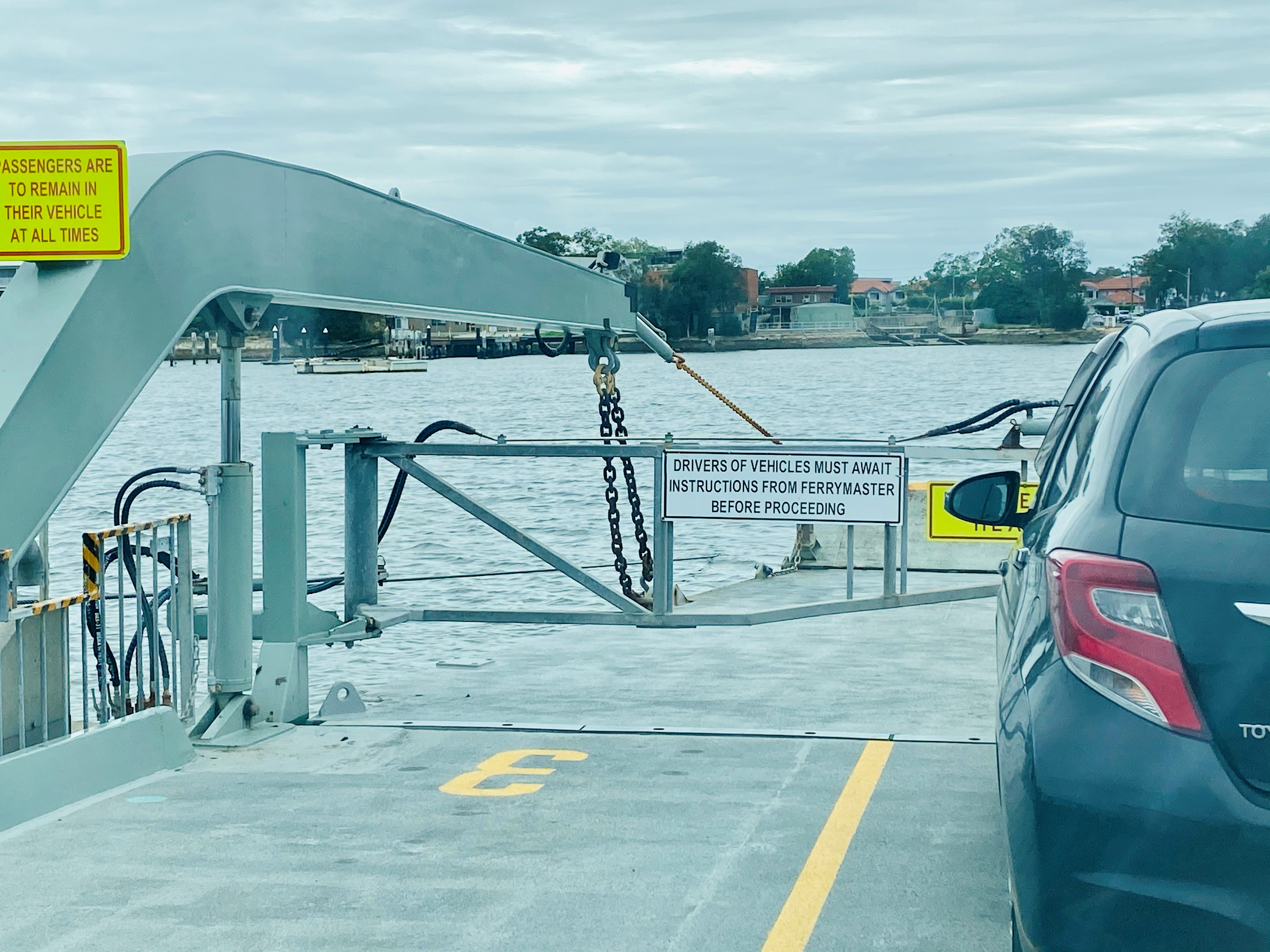
Mortlake Ferry approaching Mortlake

The vehicular ferry between Mortlake and Putney commenced operating on 16 May 1928. The service was established to serve the factory areas of Mortlake. The ferry opening pre-dated the nearby Ryde Bridge which opened in 1935, and it was one of several vehicular ferries operating across the Parramatta River at the time.

The Mortlake Ferry is one of ten remaining vehicular cable ferries in New South Wales, and the only one still in use on Sydney Harbour or its tributaries. While carrying much less traffic than it has in the past, the ferry still operates daily and is protected by a heritage order by the National Trust of Australia.

== Operation ==
The ferry is operated by a private sector operator under contract to Transport for NSW, carrying a maximum of 15 cars plus passengers at a time, and is free of tolls. The crossing is some 300 metres (980 ft) in length and takes approximately five minutes. The ferry operates on demand on weekdays from 06:45 to 09:25 and 14:45 to 18:15. On weekends and public holidays it operates on demand 10:30 to 17:30 from Mortlake.

The ferry has magenta flashing lights on the ferry and at both end points when it is in operation. Sydney Ferries services must grant right of way to the Mortlake Ferry unless they have established radio contact and agreed on priority.

== Mortlake Slipway ==
A slipway located to the south of the Mortlake approach ramp is used for the maintenance of all the RMS owned ferries operating in the Sydney region. Besides the Mortlake Ferry, this includes the Berowra Waters Ferry, Sackville Ferry, Lower Portland Ferry, Webbs Creek Ferry and Wisemans Ferry, all of which operate on the Hawkesbury River and its tributaries.
