= No. 17 Radar Station RAAF =

No. 17 Radar Station RAAF was a Royal Australian Air Force radar station formed at Burrewarra Point, Guerilla Bay, New South Wales, Australia on 12 April 1943. The radar became operational on 29 April 1943 after initial training and setting up the radar equipment.

The radar station at Burrewarra Point monitored any enemy airborne threats during World War II. The radar equipment was housed in two concrete reinforced igloo buildings.

No. 17 Radar Station RAAF was disbanded on 4 March 1946. There is currently a commemorative plaque at the location.

== Commanding officers ==
- H.C. Harrison (PltOff) - 18 April 1943
- J.S. Flett (PltOff) - 16 August 1943
- L.L. Birch (PltOff) - 16 November 1943
- L.F. Sawford (FlgOff) - 10 February 1944
- H.H. Milvain (PltOff) - 29 June 1944
- L.H. Esmore (PltOff) - 10 October 1944
