= Burrewarra Point =

Point in New South Wales, Australia

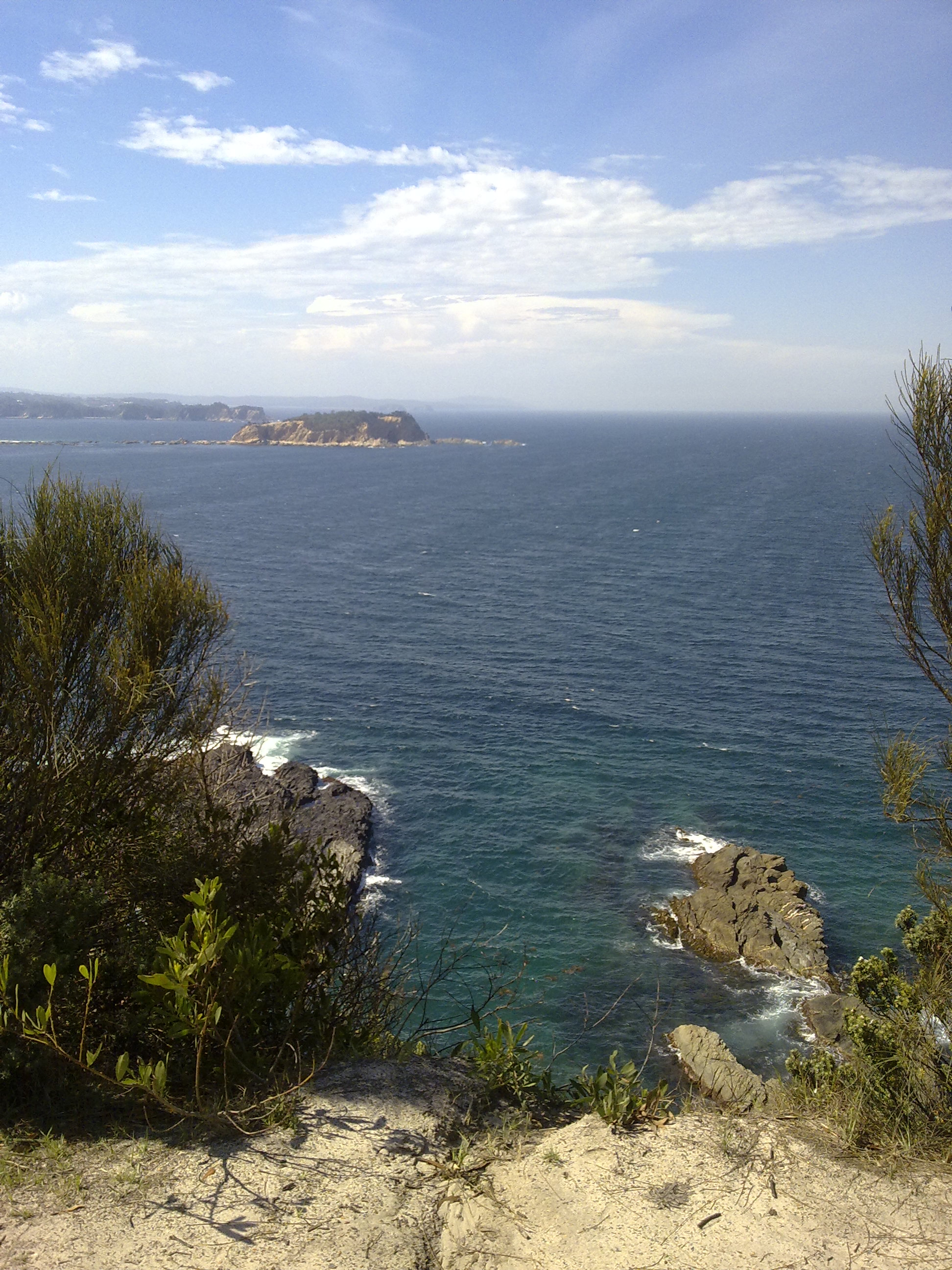
Looking north east from Burrewarra Point towards Jimmys Island and Pretty Point.

Burrewarra Point is to the north of Broulee and 25 kilometres south of Batemans Bay on the south coast of New South Wales, Australia.

An active lighthouse, Burrewarra Point Light, is located at Burrewarra Point. It was built in 1974.

Also at Burrewarra Point are the remains of concrete igloo buildings of No. 17 Radar Station used by the Royal Australian Air Force during World War II. Also present at the location is a commemorative plaque.
