= NSW Maritime =

Agency overview
- Formed: 1 July 1995
- Preceding agency: Maritime Services Board
- Dissolved: 31 October 2011
- Superseding agency: Roads & Maritime Services
- Jurisdiction: New South Wales
- Headquarters: Sydney
- Minister responsible: Eric Roozendaal, Minister for Ports & Waterways
- Agency executive: Steve Dunn, Chief Executive
- Website: www.maritime.nsw.gov.au

NSW Maritime, the trading name of Maritime Authority of New South Wales, was an agency of the Government of New South Wales, Australia responsible for marine safety, regulation of commercial and recreational boating and oversight of port operations. The Authority had responsibility for marine incident investigation, including the causes of incidents involving shipping and commercial vessels and breaches of State or Commonwealth navigation laws. Incidents involving Sydney Ferries vessels are examined by the Office of Transport Safety Investigations, which is also responsible for investigations into incidents involving publicly owned rail and bus transport. The Authority was also responsible for property management of submerged lands in Sydney Harbour, Newcastle Harbour, Botany Bay and Port Kembla, and for providing strategic advice on ports and maritime matters to the NSW Government.

NSW Maritime's powers were drawn from the NSW Ports and Maritime Administration Act 1995. The agency reported to the Treasurer and Minister for Ports and Waterways. High profile matters NSW Maritime investigated include into the grounding of the bulk carrier Pasha Bulker off Newcastle in June 2007 and into a series of fatal incidents on Sydney Harbour in 2007–2008.

NSW Maritime is now part of Transport for NSW.

== History ==
The Waterways Authority was formed in 1995, taking over the functions of the Maritime Services Board. The assets of the Marine Ministerial Holding Corporation were also transferred to the Waterways Authority in 2000. On 1 September 2004, NSW Maritime became the trading name of the Waterways Authority, and the name of the Waterways Authority was officially changed to the Maritime Authority of NSW on 20 June 2006. On 1 November 2011 NSW Maritime was merged with the Roads & Traffic Authority to form the New South Wales Roads & Maritime Services.

Safety campaigns included "You're the Skipper, You're Responsible"; "Take Care be Prop Aware" propeller safety campaign; improved vessel lighting and lifejacket laws.

Maritime NSW dealt with recreational boating so the dataset included registrations for recreational vessels (RV) as well as personal watercraft recreational (PWCR) and the boating licence counts were for the same general boating licence - recreational vessel and general PWC boating licence.

== Lighthouses ==
NSW Maritime was responsible for the management of 13 lighthouses in New South Wales.
