= Burrewarra Point Light =

Lighthouse in New South Wales, Australia

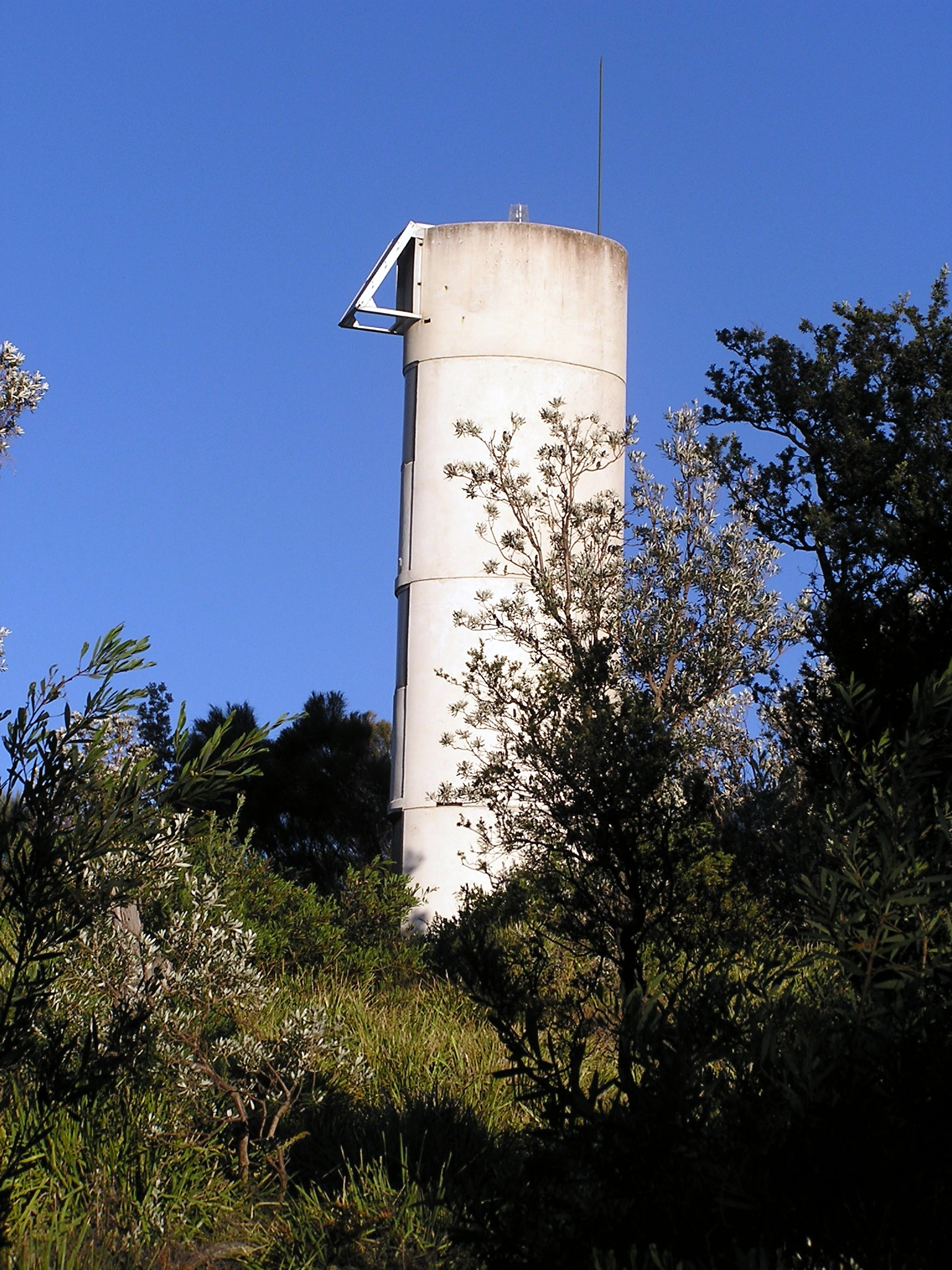
- Burrewarra Point Light. The solar panel can be seen on the top left of the tower.
- Location: Burrewarra Point; New South Wales; Australia
- Coordinates: 35°50′1.93″S 150°14′1.11″E

Tower
- Constructed: 1974
- Construction: concrete tower
- Automated: 1974
- Height: 33 feet (10 m)
- Shape: elliptical cylindrical tower and no lantern
- Markings: white tower
- Power source: solar power
- Operator: Australian Maritime Safety Authority

Light
- Focal height: 203 feet (62 m)
- Range: 9 nautical miles (17 km)
- Characteristic: Fl (4) W 15s.

Burrewarra Point Light is an active lighthouse located at Burrewarra Point, New South Wales, Australia, which is north of Broulee and 25 kilometres (16 mi) to the south of Batemans Bay.

The light was constructed in 1974 as an automated lighthouse which was powered from batteries charged from the mains. In 1984 it was converted to solar power, with battery backup.

The light has no lantern.

== Site operation and visiting ==
The lighthouse is operated by Transport for NSW. The site is open and accessible to the public, but the tower is closed.

== See also ==
- List of lighthouses in Australia
