= Wisemans Ferry =

Cable ferry in NSW, Australia

Coordinates: 33°22′45″S 150°59′20″E

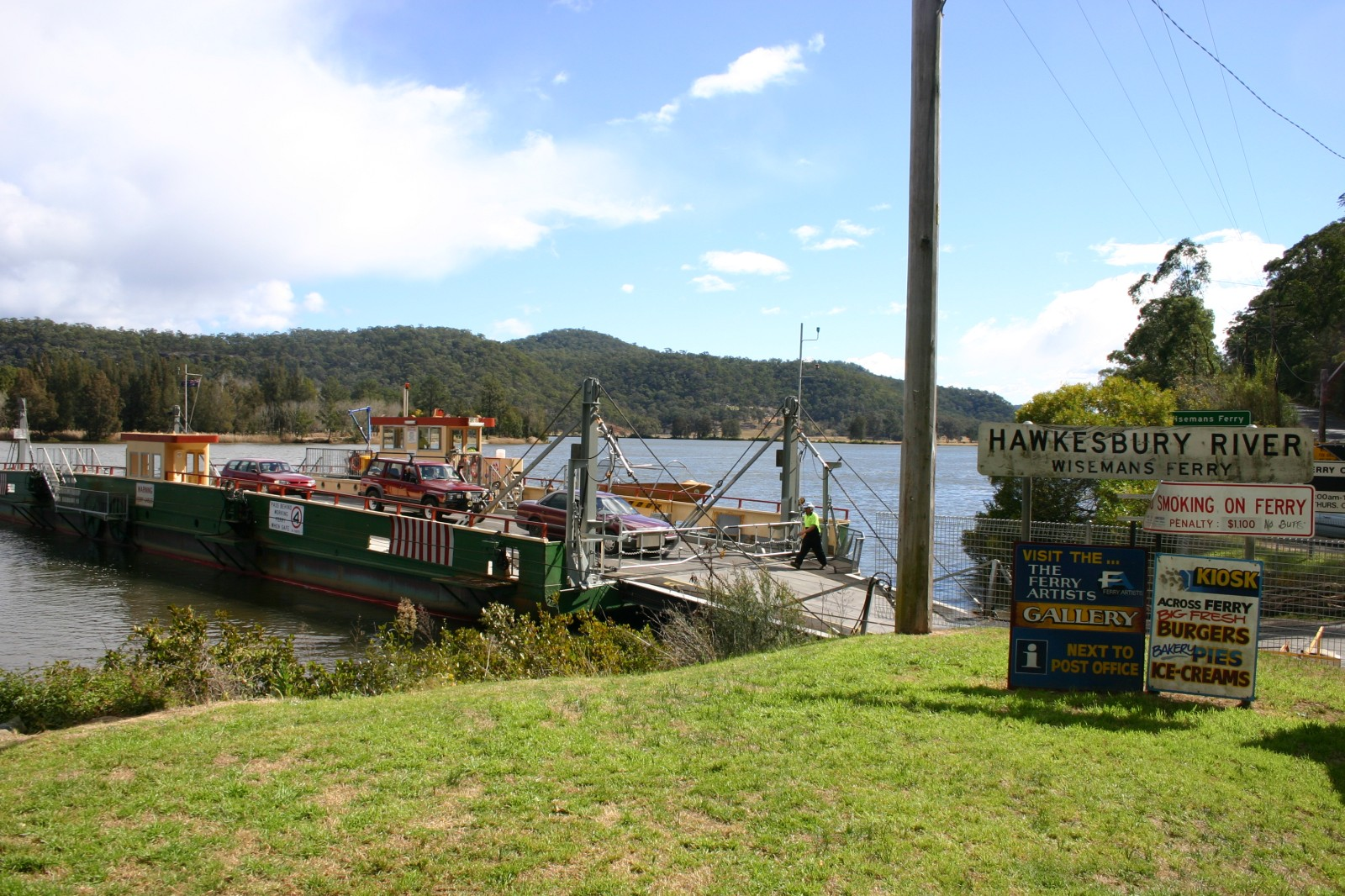
The larger of the two ferry boats on the Wisemans Ferry crossing, at the southern terminal

Wisemans Ferry is a cable ferry across the Hawkesbury River in New South Wales, Australia. The ferry operates from the eponymous community of Wisemans Ferry on the south bank, to a point on the north bank downstream of the Hawkesbury River's confluence with the Macdonald River, connecting with the old Great North Road. The crossing has remained in use on its current site since 1829, making it the oldest ferry crossing still in operation in New South Wales, and possibly in Australia.

== Operation ==
The ferry is operated by a private sector operator under contract to Transport for NSW and is free of tolls. The crossing is 366 metres (1,201 ft) in length and takes approximately 4 minutes. The ferry operates on demand 24 hours a day, 7 days a week, with no regular maintenance closure. Two ferry boats are available at this crossing, operating on separate sets of cables, and when traffic demands it both may be in use. The larger of the two boats carries up to 24 cars, while the smaller one carries 18 cars.

The ferry is one of two cable ferry crossings in the community of Wisemans Ferry, the other being Webbs Creek Ferry, which crosses the Hawkesbury River to a point upstream of the confluence with the Macdonald River. Two other such ferries cross the Hawkesbury River proper, these being the Sackville Ferry and the Lower Portland Ferry, while a fifth ferry, the Berowra Waters Ferry, crosses a side-arm of the river.

== History ==
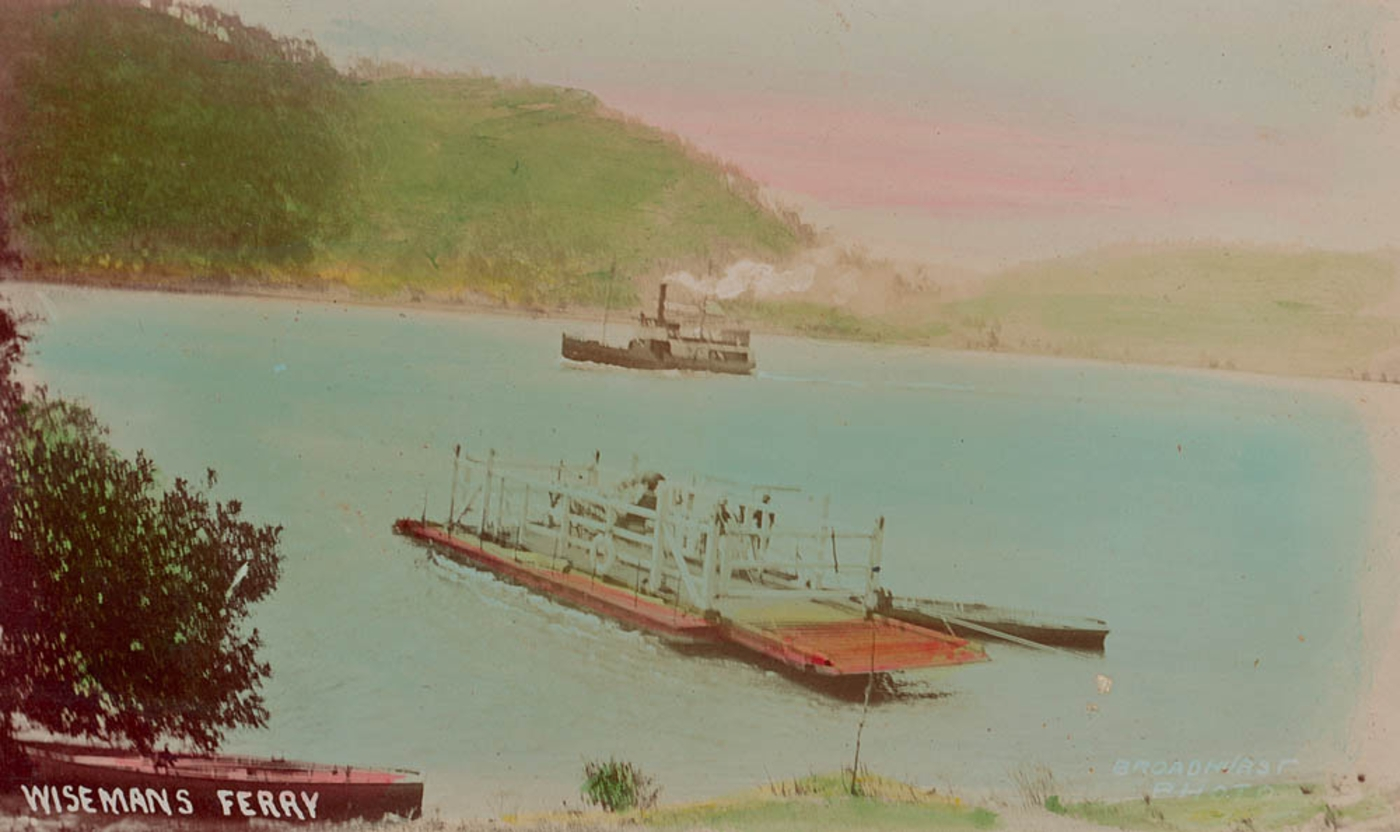
Wisemans Ferry (early 20th century)

The ferry is named after its founder, Solomon Wiseman, a former convict (1778–1838), who received a land grant in the area from Governor Macquarie in 1817. Wiseman established the ferry service in 1827 for the transport of produce and provisions to the convicts building the Great North Road to link Sydney with the fertile Hunter Valley. Initially located 2 kilometres (1.2 mi) downstream of its present location, the crossing was moved to its present location in 1829 when the Great North Road was repositioned and reconstructed. In 1832, the Wisemans ferry service was purchased by the government.

Until the opening of the Peats Ferry Bridge across the Hawkesbury at Brooklyn, Wisemans Ferry was on one of the main road routes north out of Sydney. However, when that bridge opened in 1945, vehicular traffic along the Great North Road through Wisemans Ferry was reduced, and the crossing at Wisemans Ferry could no longer be considered to be on the main route north to Newcastle.

== See also ==
- Mortlake Ferry
