= Webbs Creek Ferry =

Cable ferry across the Hawkesbury River in New South Wales, Australia

Coordinates: 33°23′15″S 150°58′49″E

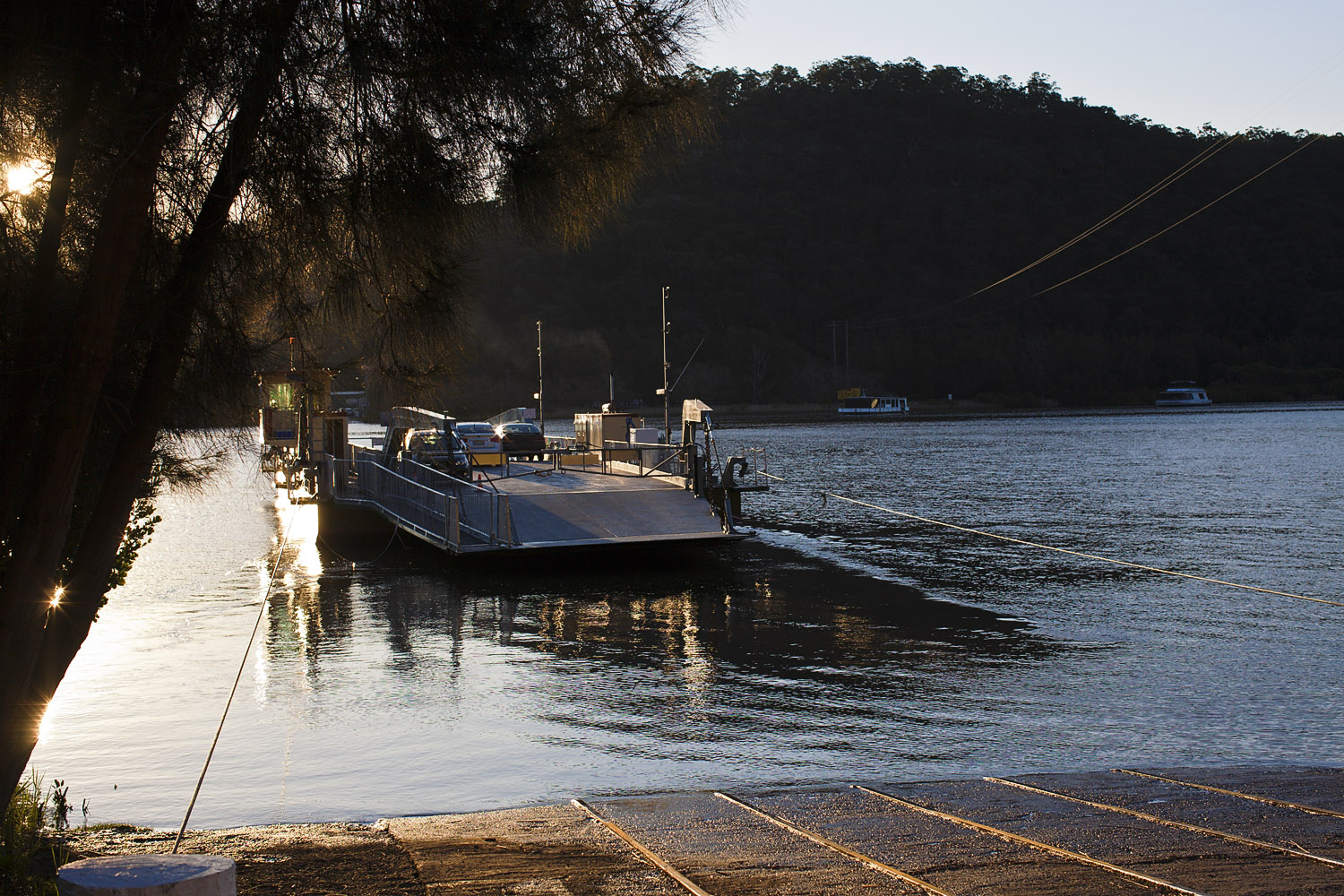
Webbs Creek Ferry, departing the Wisemans Ferry side of the Hawkesbury River

Webbs Creek Ferry is a cable ferry across the Hawkesbury River in New South Wales, Australia. The ferry operates from the community of Wisemans Ferry, to a point up-stream of the Hawkesbury River's confluence with the Macdonald River, thus connecting with St Albans Road that follows the west bank of the Macdonald River.

The ferry is operated by a private sector operator under contract to Transport for NSW and is free of tolls. The crossing is 414 metres (1,358 ft) in length and takes approximately 5 minutes. The ferry operates on demand 24 hours a day, 7 days a week, but is closed for maintenance on the first Tuesday of each month from 0930 to 1200.

The Webbs Creek Ferry is one of two cable ferry crossings at Wisemans Ferry, the other being the eponymous Wisemans Ferry, which crosses the Hawkesbury River to a point downstream of the confluence with the Macdonald River. Two other such ferries cross the Hawkesbury River proper, these being the Sackville Ferry and the Lower Portland Ferry, whilst a fifth ferry, the Berowra Waters Ferry, crosses a side-arm of the river.

== See also ==
- Mortlake Ferry
- Webbs Creek
