= Lower Portland Ferry =

Cable ferry

Coordinates: 33°26′18″S 150°53′12″E

The Lower Portland Ferry is a cable ferry across the Hawkesbury River in New South Wales, Australia. The ferry is situated in the community of Lower Portland.

The ferry is operated by a private sector operator under contract to Hawkesbury City Council and The Hills Shire Council, who jointly fund the service. The crossing is 209 metres (686 ft) in length and is free of tolls. As of Tuesday, 1 September 2020, the operating hours of the Lower Portland Ferry are 6am to 10pm daily, including two half hour closures from 10am to 10:30am and 6:30pm to 7pm.

The Lower Portland Ferry is one of four cable ferry crossings over the Hawkesbury River proper, and is unusual in being the only one not provided by Transport for NSW. The others are the Sackville Ferry upstream, and the Webbs Creek Ferry and Wisemans Ferry downstream. A fifth ferry, the Berowra Waters Ferry, crosses a side-arm of the river.
