= Sackville Ferry =

Coordinates: 33°30′04″S 150°52′28″E

Sackville Ferry New South Wales
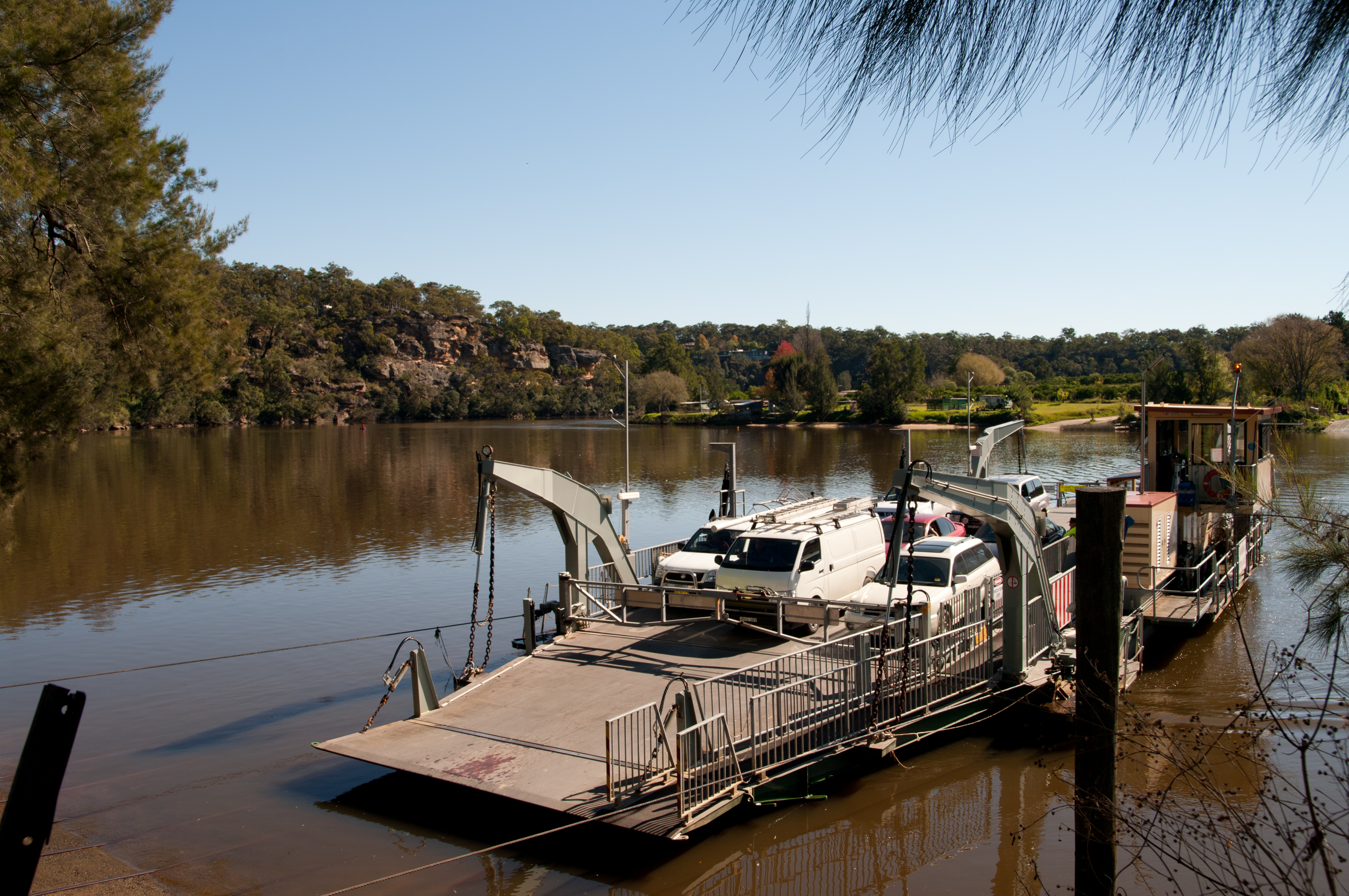
- Ferry approaching Sackville
- LGA(s): City of Hawkesbury

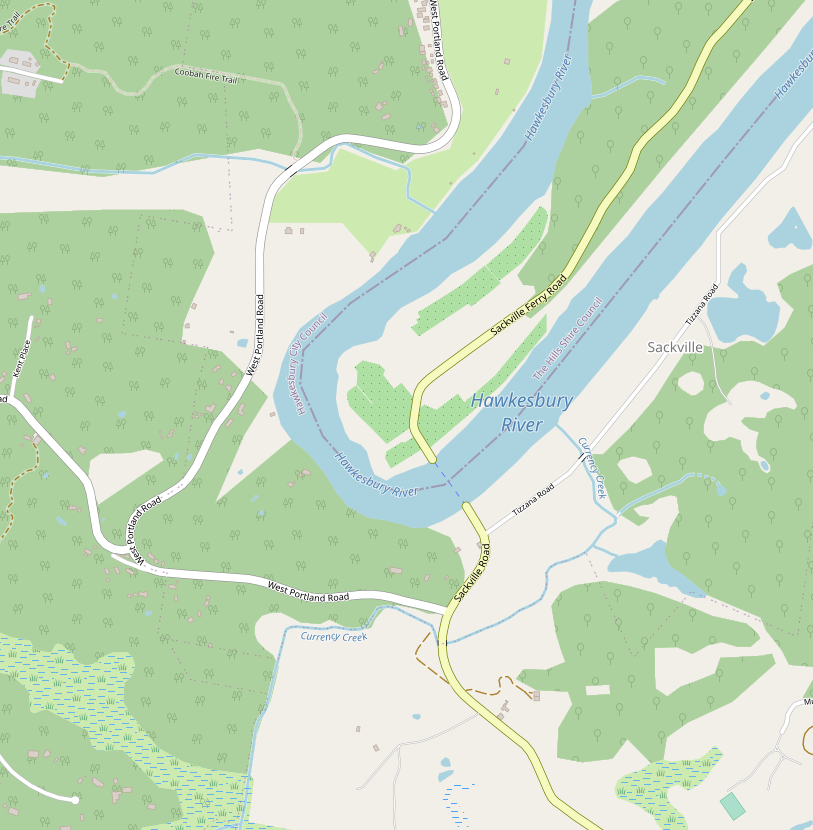
Location of the Sackville Ferry

The Sackville Ferry is a cable ferry across the Hawkesbury River in New South Wales, Australia. The vehicular ferry connects the communities of Sackville, on the north/west bank of the river, and Sackville North, on the south/east bank. Because of the tortuous course of the river, the ferry actually runs north-west from Sackville to Sackville North.

The ferry is operated by a private sector operator under contract to Transport for NSW, carries a maximum of 12 cars at a time, and is free of tolls. The crossing is 290 metres (950 ft) in length and takes approximately 3 minutes. The ferry operates on demand 24 hours a day, 7 days a week, but is closed for maintenance on the first Wednesday of each month between 1245 and 1515.

The Sackville Ferry is the farthest upstream of four vehicular cable ferry crossings of the Hawkesbury River proper - between Windsor Bridge and Brooklyn. In order downstream, the others are: the Lower Portland Ferry, Webbs Creek Ferry and Wisemans Ferry. A fifth ferry, the Berowra Waters Ferry, crosses a side-arm of the river.

A ferry service is known to have operated across the river at Sackville since at least 1883, and possibly the 1870s. Initially privately owned, by c1908 the operation of the ferry was sub-contracted by Baulkham Hills Shire Council to a local resident. In 1918 the ferry was jointly owned and managed by the Colo Shire Council and Baulkham Hills Council. It was taken over by the New South Wales Department of Main Roads, a predecessor of Transport for NSW, shortly after that body's inception in 1932.
