= Berowra Waters Ferry =

Cable ferry service in Australia

Coordinates: 33°36′00″S 151°07′25″E

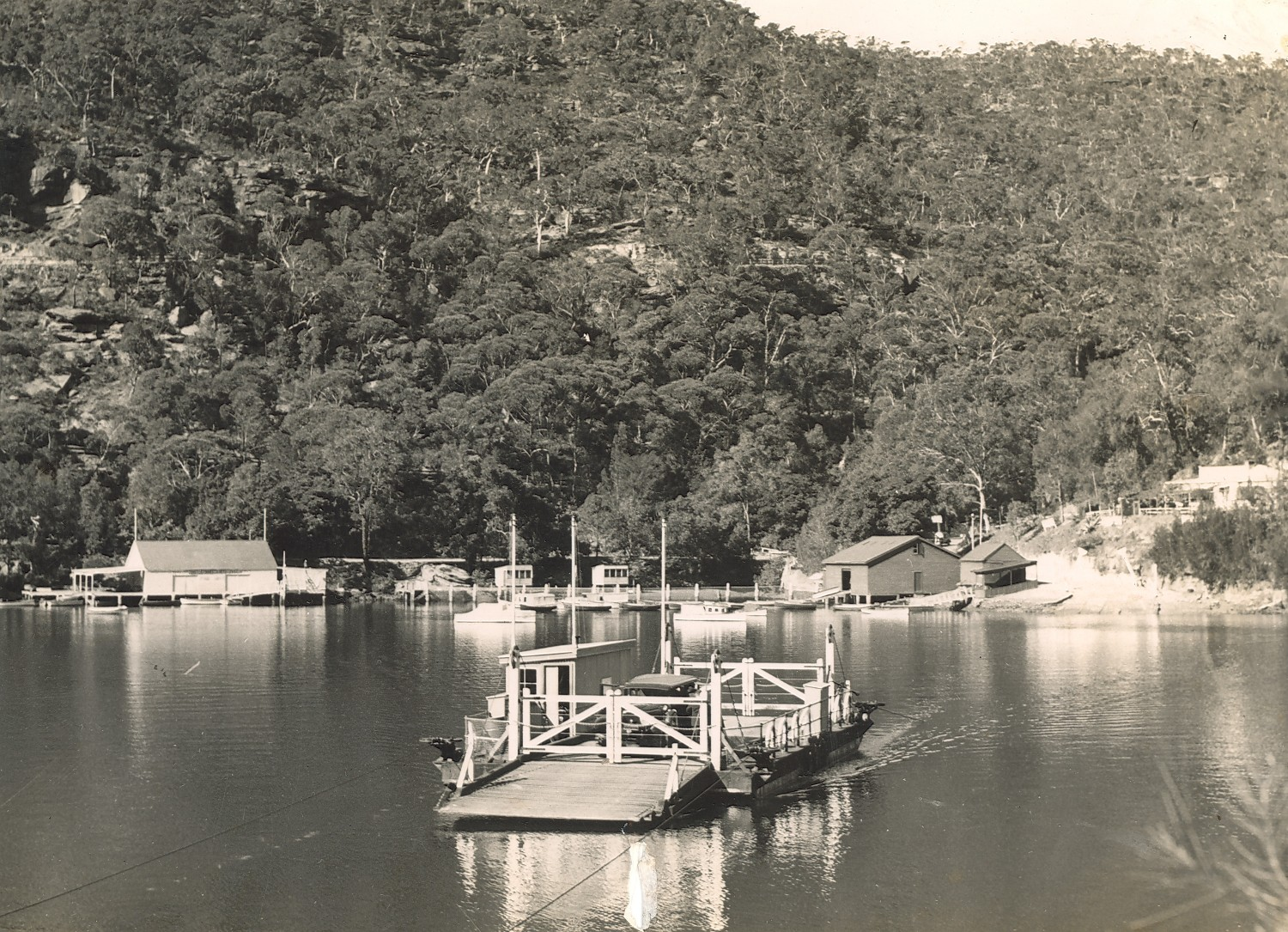
- Locale: Berowra Waters, New South Wales, Australia
- Waterway: Berowra Creek
- Transit type: Passenger and automobile cable ferry
- Owner: Transport for NSW
- Operator: Private sector contractor
- System length: 250 metres (820 ft)
- No. of vessels: 1
- Daily ridership: 133
- Website: Transport for NSW

The Berowra Waters Ferry is a cable ferry across the Berowra Creek, a tributary of the Hawkesbury River, located in the Berowra Valley National Park in Sydney, New South Wales, Australia. The ferry operates from the community of Berowra Waters on the west bank of the creek, to a landing on the east bank, thus connecting with the road to Berowra Heights.

== Description ==
The ferry is operated by a private sector operator under contract to Transport for NSW, and is free of tolls. The crossing is 250 metres (820 ft) in length and takes approximately three minutes. The ferry operates on demand 24 hours a day, 7 days a week, but is closed for maintenance on the second Tuesday of each month from 1200 to 1430.

The Berowra Waters Ferry is one of five cable ferry crossings of the Hawkesbury River system. All the others are across the main channel of the river, comprising in order downstream the Sackville Ferry, Lower Portland Ferry, Webbs Creek Ferry and Wisemans Ferry.
