= Perrys Crossing =

Coordinates: 33°11′55″S 150°58′04″E

Perrys Crossing is a locality of Sydney, in the state of New South Wales, Australia. It is located in the City of Hawkesbury north of St Albans. It lies across Mogo Creek, a tributary of the Macdonald River which flows into the Hawkesbury River.
