= Mogo Creek, New South Wales =

Mogo Creek New South Wales
- Coordinates: 33°9′58″S 151°3′54″E
- Population: 10 (SAL 2021)
- LGA(s): City of Hawkesbury
- State electorate(s): Hawkesbury
- Federal division(s): Macquarie

Mogo Creek is a locality within the City of Hawkesbury, in outer metropolitan Sydney, in the state of New South Wales, Australia. It is located south-west of the town of Bucketty. Mangrove Creek Dam is within the locality, and the western half of the locality is within Yengo National Park. Mogo Creek runs adjacent to the locality.
