= Price Morris Cottage =

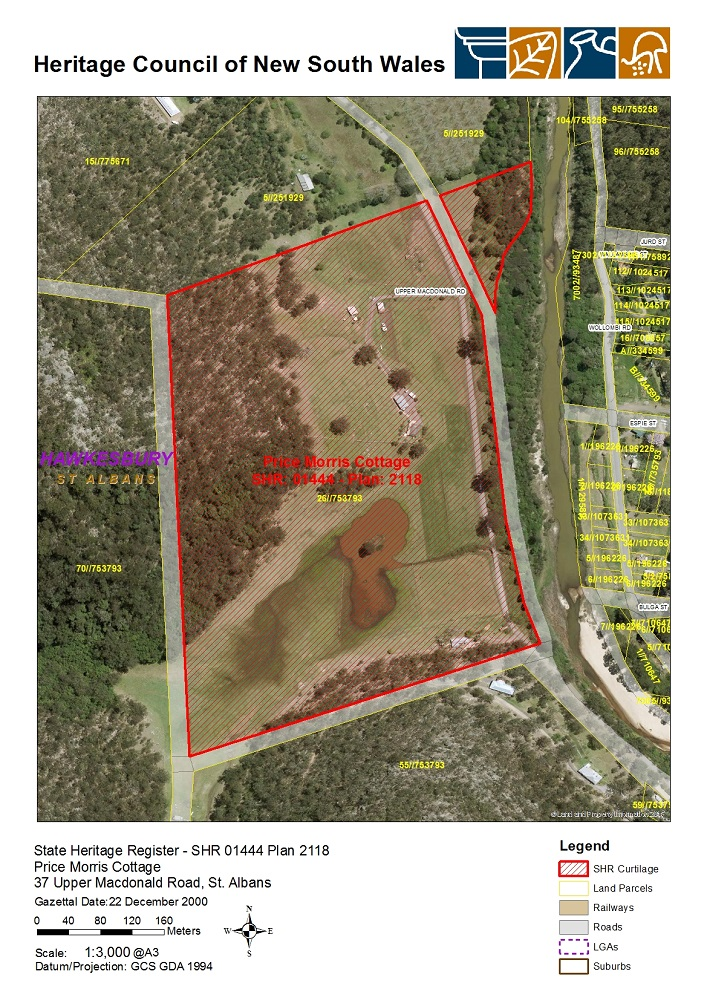
- Heritage boundaries

- Location within New South Wales Location within Australia
- 33.2902°S 150.9671°E
- Location: 37 Upper Macdonald Road, St Albans, City of Hawkesbury, New South Wales, Australia

History
- Built: 1835–

Site notes
- Owner: Price Morris Complex

New South Wales Heritage Register
- Official name: Price Morris Cottage
- Type: state heritage (built)
- Designated: 22 December 2000
- Reference no.: 1444
- Type: Cottage
- Category: Residential buildings (private)
- Builders: Price Price Morris and family

Price Morris Cottage is a heritage-listed residence at 37 Upper Macdonald Road, St Albans, City of Hawkesbury, New South Wales, Australia. It was built from 1835 by Price Morris and family. It was added to the New South Wales State Heritage Register on 22 December 2000.

== History ==
Price Morris was a Welshman who was in 1812 transported to New South Wales with a life sentence at around age 29. Six years after his arrival, around 1818, he married Mary, who was born in the colony and was twenty years her husband's junior. Over the first ten years of marriage, Price and Mary had five children – Sarah (b. 1819), Elizabeth (b. 1821), Price, Jr. (b. 1824), William (b. 1826), and Mary (b. 1828). By 1828 Price senior had his ticket of leave and the family was living on 12 hectares (30 a) at Lower Portland on the Hawkesbury River, cultivating 10 hectares (25 a) and running half a dozen cattle.

Shortly after the surveyor Felton Mathew compiled his map of all the occupied farms in the Macdonald Valley in 1833-34 (on which the Morrises do not feature), Price and Mary moved to St Albans, and on this land, just to the south of the swampy land in the middle of the rectangular block, they built the slab section of the present cottage. The cottage was deliberately on an elevated site to minimise the danger of flooding and overlooked their cultivation paddock. The exact date of building is not known, but it is likely to be between 1835 and 1837. Certainly the house was in existence by 1838 when what is claimed to have been the first Methodist service in the area was held in the cottage.

Methodism was a strong bond between the Morrises and the Walker family who had moved from the Hawkesbury to the Macdonald around 1830 and established three generations of Methodist preachers. The Walters of the Industrious Settler, some of the Baileys, and the large Thompson fan-lily were also Methodists living nearby. This Methodist group was a counter-balance to the powerful Catholic influence of Sheehy and Watson, who gave land for the Catholic churches of St Joseph's and Our Lady of Loreto in 1839. Catholicism was also strong in the new township of St Albans.

The survey in 1837 and gazettal in 1841 of a government township just across the Macdonald River from Price Morris's cottage confirmed the strategic nature of his purchase. In the 1830s there was a long-established cattle drovers' camp and a "bullock wharf" nearby on the river, at the head of navigation. The creation of the small grid pattern township of St Albans in the 1840s brought more population, much of it Catholic and Anglican, purchasing town allotments in 1842 and thereafter. The Anglican church was opened in 1843, in the township, the Settlers Arms in 1848. A Methodist church was finally built in 1853.

By 1844 Price and Mary Morris had eleven children, establishing a network of interrelationships with other valley families, but both then returned to England and never returned to Australia. Price died in 1867 and Mary in 1888. Price, Jr. is presumably the Price Morris who was buried in St Albans cemetery in the year of his father's death, 1867.

Margaret, one of the daughters-in-law of Price senior, was "Mag the Midwife" (b. 1839) whose business brought many visitors to the Morris cottage until her death in 1907.

The third generation included William Price Morris (1874–1957), a grandson of Price and Mary; his memories of nineteenth-century St Albans were extensively used by Mrs Hutton Neve in her history of the valley.

After William Price Morris died in 1957, the land remained in Morris hands but the original cottage was occupied by Beatrice Rose, a member of a very early Hawkesbury and Webbs Creek family. In Rose's time a fibro addition was made to the house, to serve as a dining-room, while she used both the huge indoor fireplace in winter and an outdoor fireplace in summer. Rose died in the 1970s and the cottage remained unoccupied. Linton Morris and his wife, the owners of portion 26, occupied a modern house on the north end of the land. After Mr Morris' death, his widow continued to own and occupy the land, assisted by her children. The property is now owned by her daughter, Mrs Joyce Stepto and her husband Doug.

The cottage has subsequently been restored and now operates as a bed and breakfast.

== Description ==
Price Morris Cottage is a slab cottage with weatherboard extrusion on a levelled area supported by stone walling. There are five rooms with verandahs on three sides and a detached fibro-clad kitchen. The main house has one large external stone chimney which has structural defects. There is a surrounding farm complex of stables, dairy and milking bails, honey house, packing shed and privy. All roofs are corrugated iron over shingles. The main house is protected by a high wire fence for security.

== Heritage listing ==
The wooden cottage is significant at the State level because it embodies to an unusual degree the features of pioneer settlement beyond the Hawkesbury River. The construction details of the house are significantly legible, showing expansion and adaptation as well as many original features. Its situation, on a levelled area on a hillside overlooking arable and grazing land beside the river, gives it high aesthetic qualities and is recognised by artists and travellers in the area. It is exceptional in having remained in ownership of the original family for over 160 years. Its importance to early Methodists in the lower Hawkesbury before a chapel was built is also significant

Price Morris Cottage was listed on the New South Wales State Heritage Register on 22 December 2000 having satisfied the following criteria.

The place is important in demonstrating the course, or pattern, of cultural or natural history in New South Wales.

The cottage has high significance as the home of prominent Welsh Methodist settlers in the Lower Hawkesbury for several generations. It is the earliest intact slab complex in the valley and has particular significance as the earliest Methodist meeting place in the area.

The place is important in demonstrating aesthetic characteristics and/or a high degree of creative or technical achievement in New South Wales.

Perched on a terrace set on the limit of cleared land on a well-treed hillside, with a stone wall retaining the levelled building site, overlooking the original cultivation and grazing paddocks, the cottage is exceptionally well sited and visible.

The place has strong or special association with a particular community or cultural group in New South Wales for social, cultural or spiritual reasons.

Price Morris Cottage has been variously: in the 1830s a centre for Methodist meetings; in the Victorian period a midwifes home; and in the twentieth century a well known scenic attraction for artists and photographers. In the area known as the home of a significant family for seven generations, the cottage has high social significance.

The place has potential to yield information that will contribute to an understanding of the cultural or natural history of New South Wales.

It has high significance for the details of vernacular building in various forms of wooden construction, detailing and wall coverings.

The place possesses uncommon, rare or endangered aspects of the cultural or natural history of New South Wales.

The uncompromised setting is now rare in the area; no comparable houses in the area has such undisturbed family ownership; it is uncommonly legible and well-preserved for a study of vernacular building; and it has retained unusual social significance over its entire history up to the present.
