= Rush Creek (New South Wales) =

Coordinates: 33°20′S 150°46′E

Rush The Rush Creek

Location
- Country: Australia
- State: New South Wales
- Region: Sydney Basin (IBRA), Outer Metropolitan Sydney
- Municipality: City of Hawkesbury

Physical characteristics
- Source: Parr Ridge
  - location: near Mile Ridge
  - elevation: 301 m (988 ft)
- Mouth: confluence with Webbs Creek
  - location: near Upper Macdonald
  - elevation: 36 m (118 ft)
- Length: 20 km (12 mi)

Basin features
- River system: Hawkesbury-Nepean catchment
- State conservation area: Parr SCA

The Rush Creek, a perennial stream of the Hawkesbury-Nepean catchment, is located in the Outer Metropolitan Sydney region of New South Wales, Australia.

== Course ==
The Rush Creek (officially designated as a river) rises about 4 kilometres (2.5 mi) south-east of the Parr Spur Ridge Trigonometry Station, near Mile Ridge and east of the Putty Road. The river flows generally north-east by east before reaching its confluence with Webbs Creek in remote country within the Parr State Conservation Area, south-west of Upper Macdonald. The river descends 265 metres (869 ft) over its 20-kilometre (12 mi) course.

== See also ==
- List of rivers of Australia
- List of rivers in New South Wales (L-Z)
- Rivers of New South Wales
