= Higher Macdonald =

- Suburb
- Coordinates: 33°12′55″S 150°56′05″E
- Country: Australia
- State: New South Wales
- LGA: City of Hawkesbury

Government
  - State electorate: Hawkesbury
  - Federal division: Macquarie
- Postcode: 2775

Higher Macdonald is a suburb of Sydney, in the state of New South Wales, Australia. It is located in the City of Hawkesbury north of Upper Macdonald. It is approximately 116 km north of the CBD.

Higher Macdonald was counted as part of St Albans at the 2011 census, which had a population of 305.
