= Wrights Creek, New South Wales =

Wrights Creek
- Suburb
- Interactive map of Wrights Creek
- Coordinates: 33°18′10″S 151°0′21″E
- Country: Australia
- State: New South Wales
- City: Sydney
- LGA: City of Hawkesbury
- Location: 90 km (56 mi) from Sydney CBD

Government
  - State electorate: Hawkesbury
  - Federal division: Macquarie

Population
  - Total: 15 (SAL 2021)
- Postcode: 2775
Suburbs around Wrights Creek
| St Albans | St Albans | St Albans |
| St Albans | Wrights Creek | Ten Mile Hollow |
| Central Macdonald | Central Macdonald | Central Macdonald |

Wrights Creek is a locality of Sydney, in the state of New South Wales, Australia. It is located in the City of Hawkesbury, north-east of Central Macdonald and 90 kilometres north-west of the Sydney CBD.
