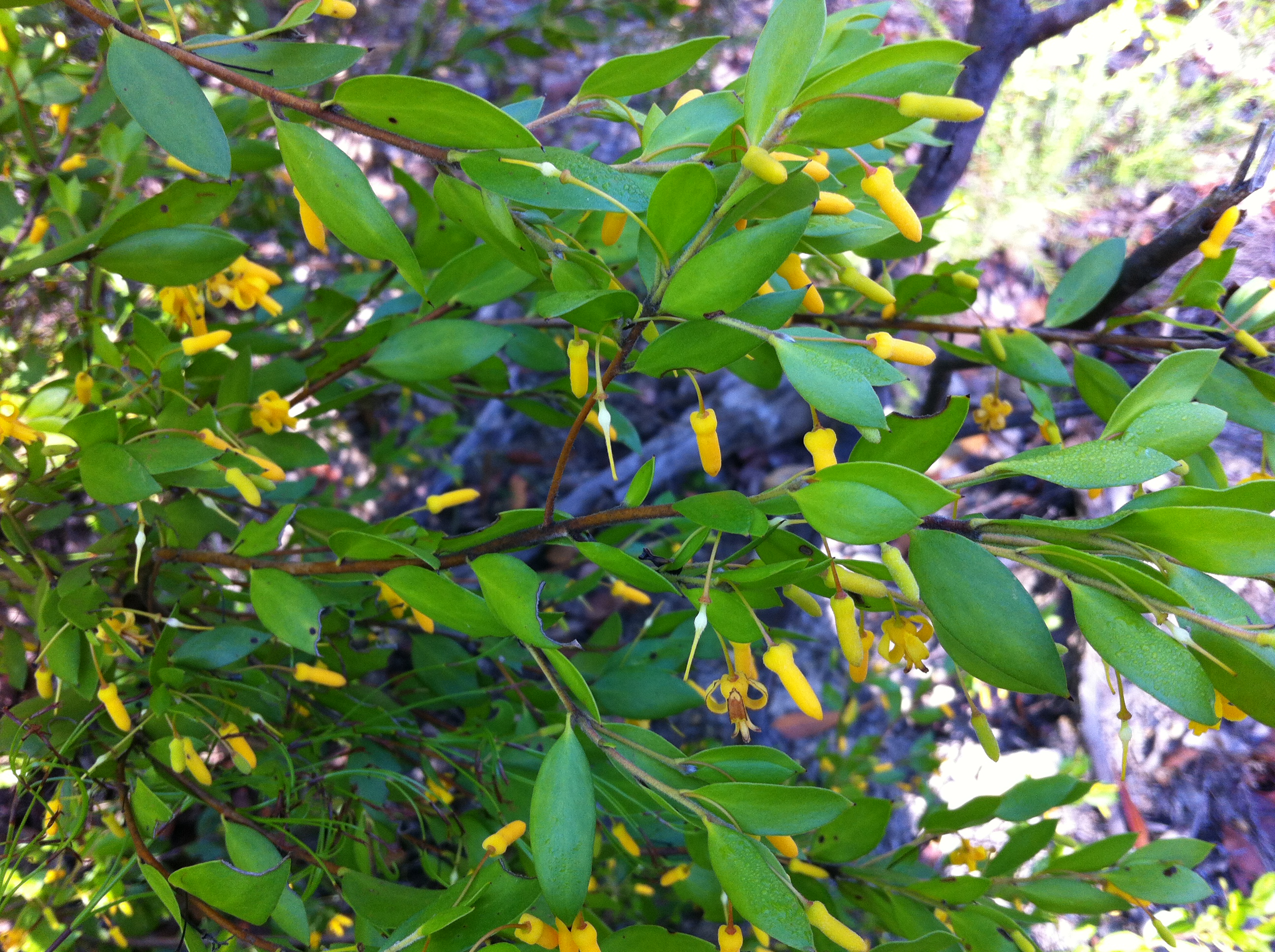
- Persoonia oblongata in Yengo National Park

Scientific classification
- Kingdom: Plantae
- Clade: Tracheophytes
- Clade: Angiosperms
- Clade: Eudicots
- Order: Proteales
- Family: Proteaceae
- Genus: Persoonia
- Species: P. oblongata

Binomial name
- Persoonia oblongata R.Br.

Synonyms
- Linkia oblongata (R.Br.) Kuntze; Persoonia planifolia A.Cunn. ex Benth. nom. inval., pro syn.

= Persoonia oblongata =

Species of shrub

Persoonia oblongata is a species of plant in the family Proteaceae and is endemic to New South Wales, Australia. It is an erect to spreading shrub with narrow elliptic to broad egg-shaped leaves and yellow flowers on long, curved pedicels and is found from the lower Blue Mountains, west to Rylstone.

== Description ==
Persoonia oblongata is an erect or spreading shrub with smooth bark and with hairy young growth. The leaves range in shape from narrow elliptic to broadly egg-shaped and are 15–60 mm (0.6–2 in) long, 4–25 mm (0.2–1 in) wide. The leaves are more or less hairy when young but become glabrous with age and the upper and lower surfaces are the same colour. The flowers are arranged singly or in groups of up to sixteen, the groups on a rachis up to 180 mm (7 in) long, each flower on the end of a distinctive glabrous, curved pedicel 9–23 mm (0.4–0.9 in) long. The flower is composed of four hairy tepals 110–12 mm (4–0.5 in) long, which are fused at the base but with the tips rolled back. The central style is surrounded by four yellow anthers which are also joined at the base with the tips rolled back, so that it resembles a cross when viewed end-on. The ovary and tepals are sometimes sparsely hairy. Flowering occurs from October to April and is followed by fruit which are drupes.

== Taxonomy and naming ==
Persoonia oblongata was first formally described in 1830 by Robert Brown and the description was published in Supplementum primum Prodromi florae Novae Hollandiae. The specific epithet (oblongata) is derived from the Latin word oblongus meaning "longer than broad".

== Distribution and habitat ==
This persoonia grows in heath and forest between Glenbrook, Yengo National Park and Rylstone.
