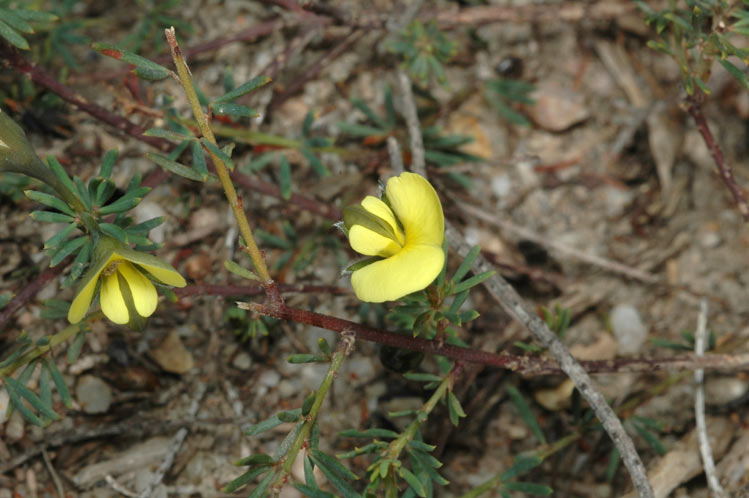
- Gompholobium inconspicuum near Braidwood

Scientific classification
- Kingdom: Plantae
- Clade: Tracheophytes
- Clade: Angiosperms
- Clade: Eudicots
- Clade: Rosids
- Order: Fabales
- Family: Fabaceae
- Subfamily: Faboideae
- Genus: Gompholobium
- Species: G. inconspicuum

Binomial name
- Gompholobium inconspicuum Benth.

= Gompholobium inconspicuum =

Creeping wedge-pea

Species of legume

Gompholobium inconspicuum, commonly known as creeping wedge-pea is a species of flowering plant in the family Fabaceae and is endemic to south-eastern continental Australia. It is a prostrate or low-lying shrub with trifoliate leaves and pale lemon yellow to yellowish green, pea-like flowers.

== Description ==
Gompholobium inconspicuum is a prostrate or low-lying shrub that typically grows to a height of up to 20 cm (7.9 in) with young stems that are glabrous or sparsely hairy. The leaves are trifoliate with linear leaflets, 3–10 mm (0.12–0.39 in) long, about 1 mm (0.039 in) wide with the edges curved downwards and minute stipules at the base. The flowers are arranged singly or in groups of up to three on the ends of branchlets, each flower 7–12 mm (0.28–0.47 in) long on a pedicel about 15 mm (0.59 in) long. The sepals are 5–6 mm (0.20–0.24 in) long and the petals are pale lemon yellow to yellowish green, the standard petal 7.6–8.6 mm (0.30–0.34 in) long. Flowering mainly occurs between from August to September, and the fruit is an oval pod 8–11 mm (0.31–0.43 in) long.

== Taxonomy and naming ==
Gompholobium inconspicuum was first formally described in 1995 by Michael Crisp in the journal Muelleria from specimens collected near Windsor in 1994. The specific epithet (inconspicuum) refers to the difficulty of finding the plants amongst grass tufts.

== Distribution ==
Creeping wedge-pea grows in forest in rocky places, mainly south from near Putty in New South Wales to the Genoa River in far north-eastern Victoria.
