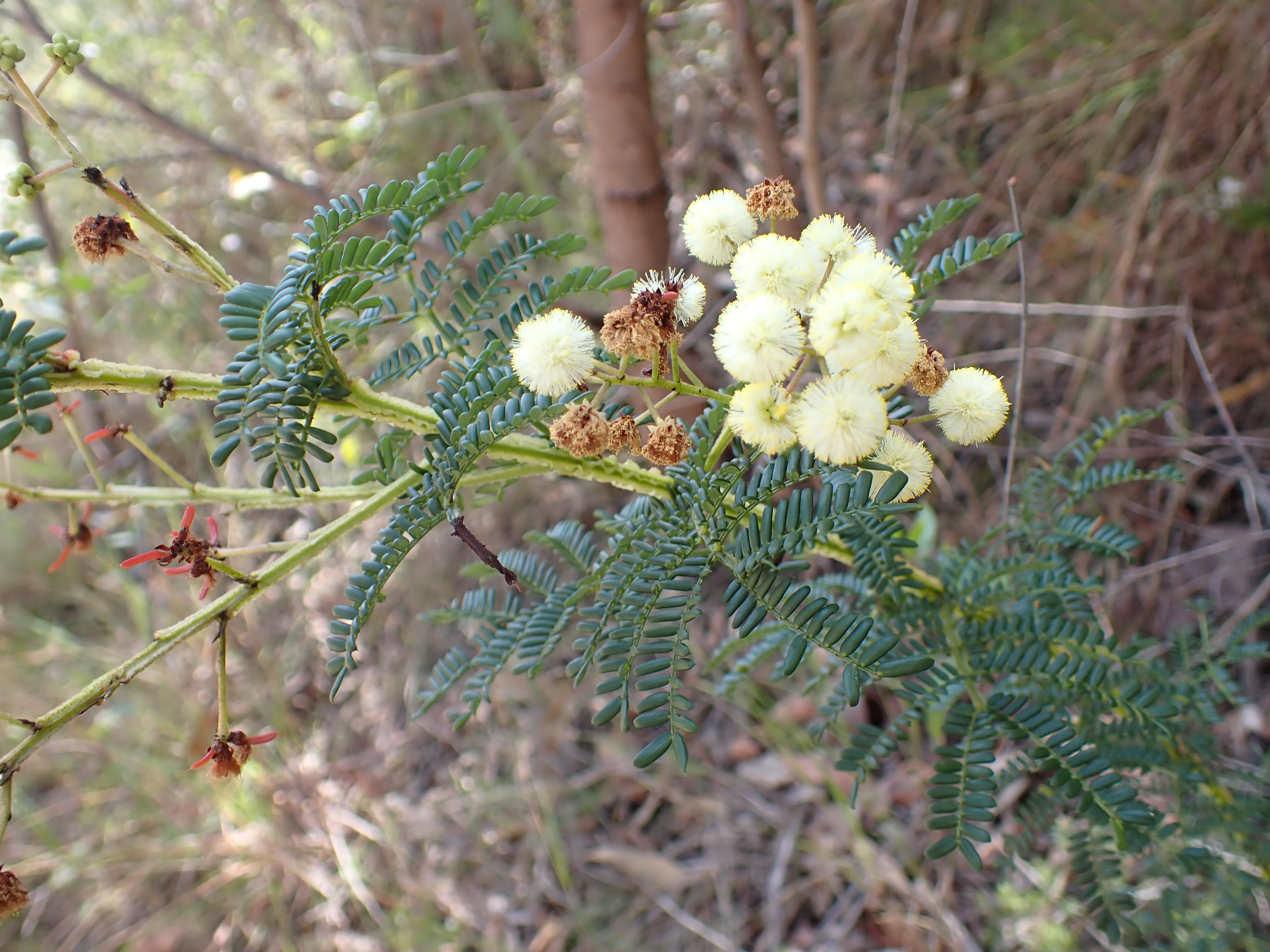

Scientific classification
- Kingdom: Plantae
- Clade: Tracheophytes
- Clade: Angiosperms
- Clade: Eudicots
- Clade: Rosids
- Order: Fabales
- Family: Fabaceae
- Subfamily: Caesalpinioideae
- Clade: Mimosoid clade
- Genus: Acacia
- Species: A. alaticaulis

Binomial name
- Acacia alaticaulis Kodela & Tindale
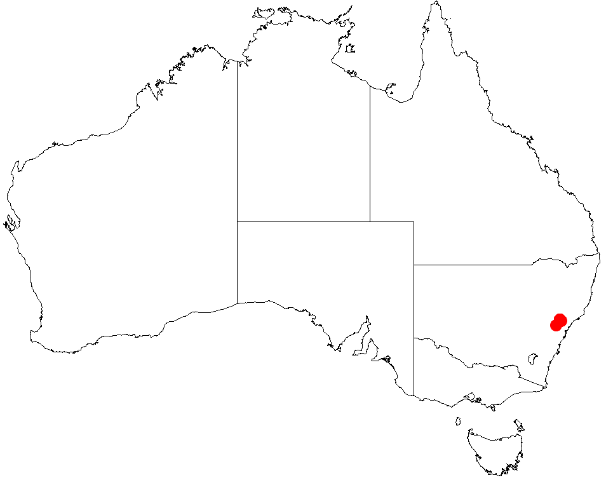

Synonyms
- List: Acacia alaticaulis Maslin nom. inval.; Acacia alaticaulis Kodela & Tindale nom. inval.; Acacia alaticaulis Pellow, Henwood & Carolin nom. inval.; Acacia sp. 35 (Howes Mountain; R.G.Coveney 4108 & R.Bis); Acacia sp. A; Acacia sp. Howes Mountain (R.G.Coveny 4108) NSW Herbarium; Acacia terminalis s. lat. (winged form); Acacia terminalis subsp. E; Acacia terminalis auct. non (Salisb.) J.F.Macbr.: Kodela, P.G. & Tindale, M.D. in Orchard, A.E. & Wilson, A.J.G.

= Acacia alaticaulis =

Species of legume

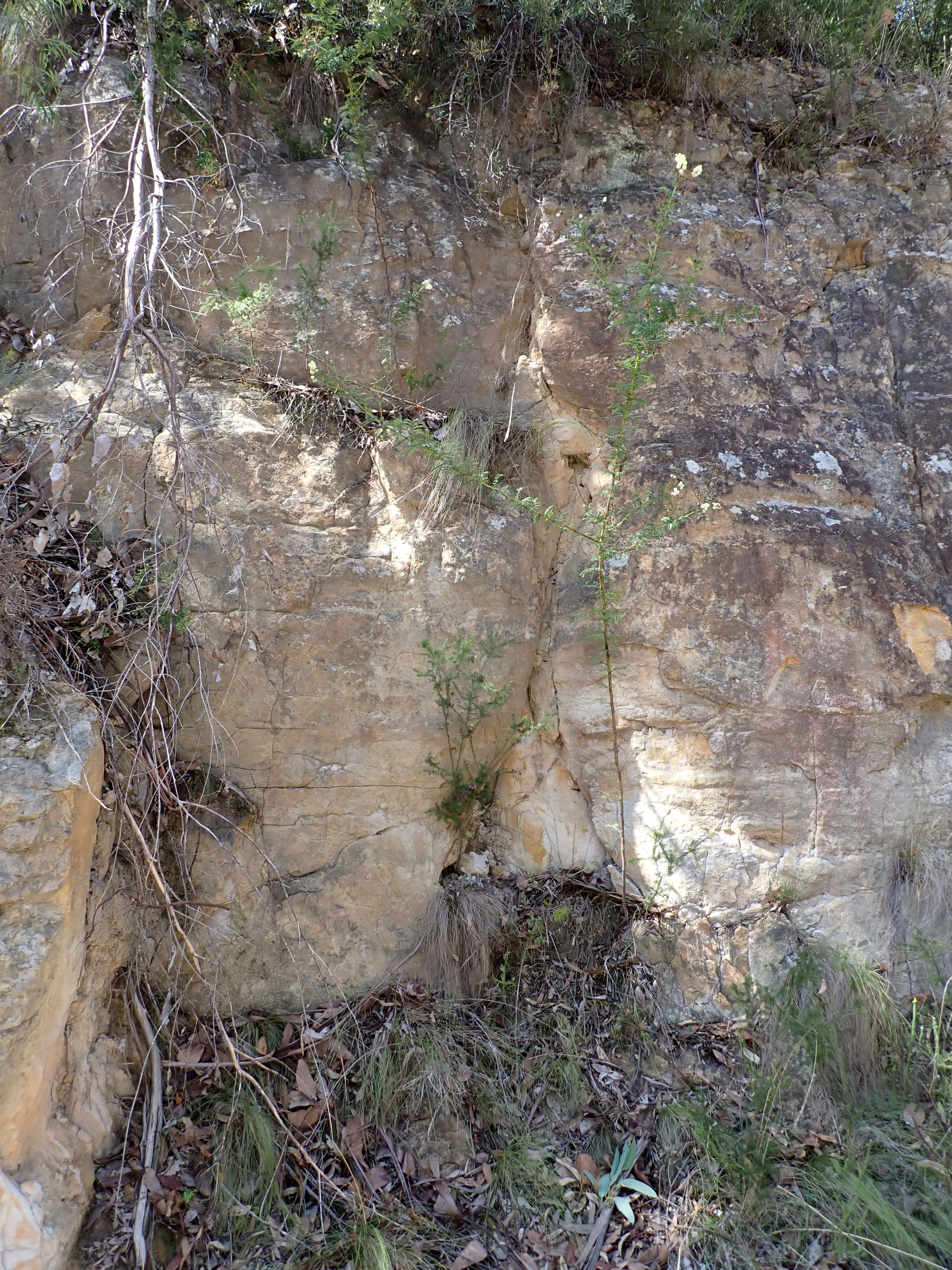
Habit in the Wollemi National Park

Acacia alaticaulis is a species of flowering plant in the family Fabaceae. It is endemic to a restricted area of New South Wales in Australia. It is a spindly, slender shrub to small tree with wavy, winged ridges on the branchlets, bipinnate leaves with 7 to 17 pairs of pinnae, flowers arranged in a racemes with 8 to 41 spherical heads of flowers, each with 12 to 16 pale yellow or pale cream-coloured flowers, and curved, more or less flat pods up to 40–120 mm (1.6–4.7 in) long.

== Description ==
Acacia alaticaulis is a spindly, slender shrub to small tree that typically grows to a height of up to 4 m (13 ft) and has wavy, ridged branchlets, the ridges up to 3 mm (0.12 in) wide. The leaves are winged with a rachis 150–850 mm (5.9–33.5 in), the petiole up to 5 mm (0.20 in) long. The leaves are bipinnate, with up to 10 pairs of pinnae 12–60 mm (0.47–2.36 in) long, each with 7 to 17 pairs of oblong to narrowly oblong pinnules 2.5–22 mm (0.098–0.866 in) long and 0.9–3.6 mm (0.035–0.142 in) wide. The flowers are arranged in a raceme up to 335 mm (13.2 in) long with 8 to 41 spherical heads of flowers. Each head is more or less spherical, 7–11 mm (0.28–0.43 in) in diameter on a peduncle 5–17 mm (0.20–0.67 in) long with 6 to 16 pale yellow to cream-coloured. Flowering occurs from December to May. The pod is flat, usually curved, 40–120 mm (1.6–4.7 in) long and 11–13 mm (0.43–0.51 in) wide.

== Taxonomy ==
Acacia alaticaulis was first formally described in 2013 by Phillip Gerhard Kodela and Mary Tindale in the journal Telopea. The specific epithet (alaticaulis) means "winged stem".

== Distribution ==
This species of wattle is endemic to an area in eastern New South Wales where it has a restricted range around Howes Mountain and Mount Murwin areas and Yengo National Park area where it is commonly situated on hillslopes and ridges among and over sandstone bedrock or outcrops, or where areas of shale meet sandstones. It is found growing in sandy to sandy clay soils as a part of Eucalyptus woodlands or open forest communities as a part of the shrub understorey.

== See also ==
- List of Acacia species
