= Lower Macdonald =

- Suburb
- Coordinates: 33°21′55″S 150°57′04″E
- Country: Australia
- State: New South Wales
- City: Sydney
- LGA: City of Hawkesbury
- Location: 78 km (48 mi) from Sydney CBD

Government
  - State electorate: Hawkesbury
  - Federal division: Macquarie

Population
  - Total: 261 (2016 census)
- Postcode: 2775
Suburbs around Lower Macdonald
St Albans	Central Macdonald	Kulnura
Colo Heights	Lower Macdonald	Gunderman and Wisemans Ferry
Webbs Creek	Maroota	Laughtondale

Lower Macdonald is a hamlet village of Sydney, in the state of New South Wales, Australia. It is in the City of Hawkesbury north-west of Wisemans Ferry on the Macdonald River near its confluence with the Hawkesbury River.

The population of Lower Macdonald at the 2016 census was 261.
