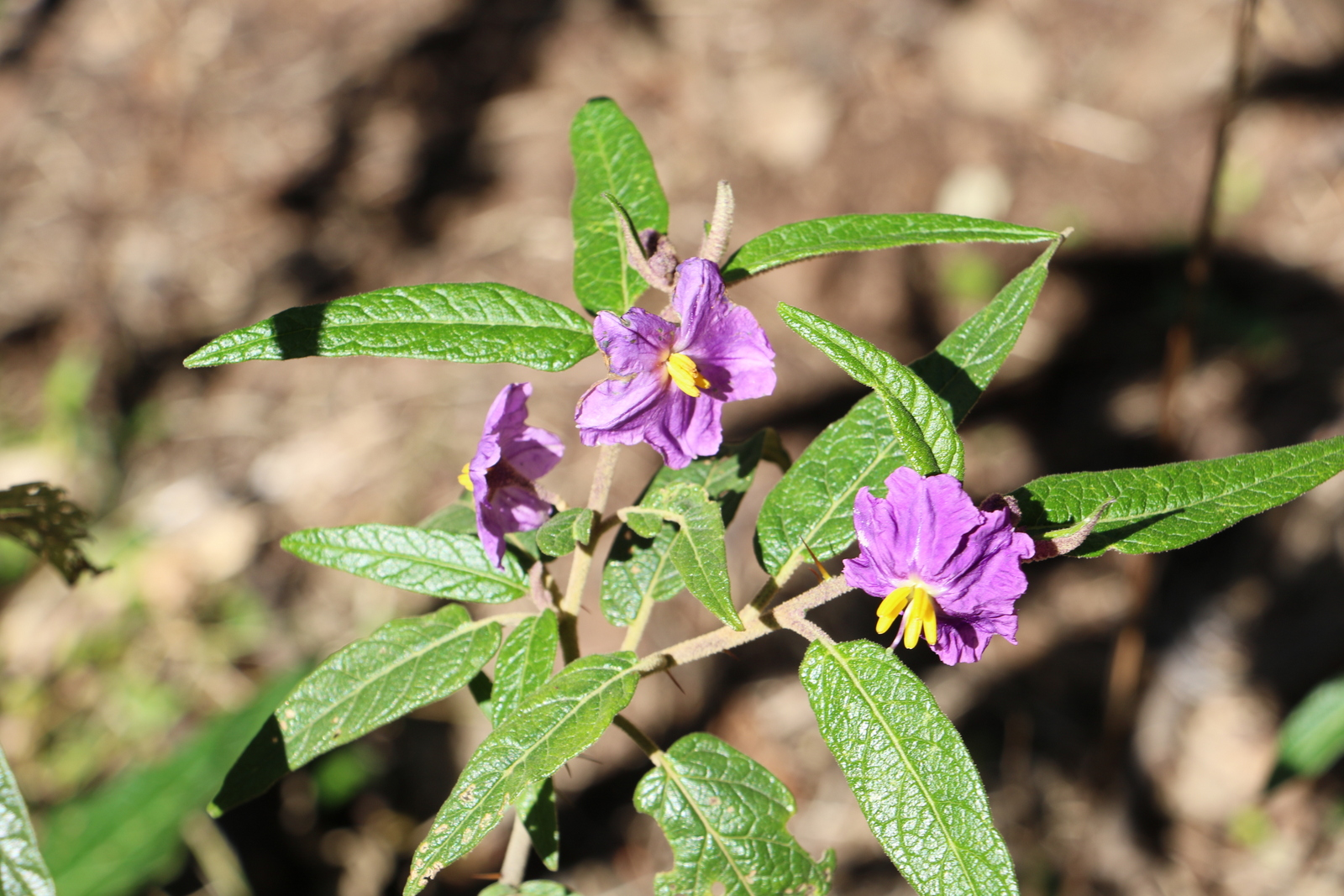
- Mount Yengo, Australia

Scientific classification
- Kingdom: Plantae
- Clade: Tracheophytes
- Clade: Angiosperms
- Clade: Eudicots
- Clade: Asterids
- Order: Solanales
- Family: Solanaceae
- Genus: Solanum
- Species: S. brownii

Binomial name
- Solanum brownii Dunal

= Solanum brownii =

Violet nightshade

Species of shrub

Solanum brownii is a prickly shrub mostly found in the Hunter Valley area of New South Wales, Australia. Purple flowers form from June to October.

It was collected in 1804 beside the banks of the Paterson River. One of the many plants first published by Robert Brown with the type known as "(J.) v.v." Appearing in his Prodromus Florae Novae Hollandiae et Insulae Van Diemen in 1810. Later described by the French botanist Michel Félix Dunal in 1813.
