= MacDonald River bridge =

MacDonald River Bridge
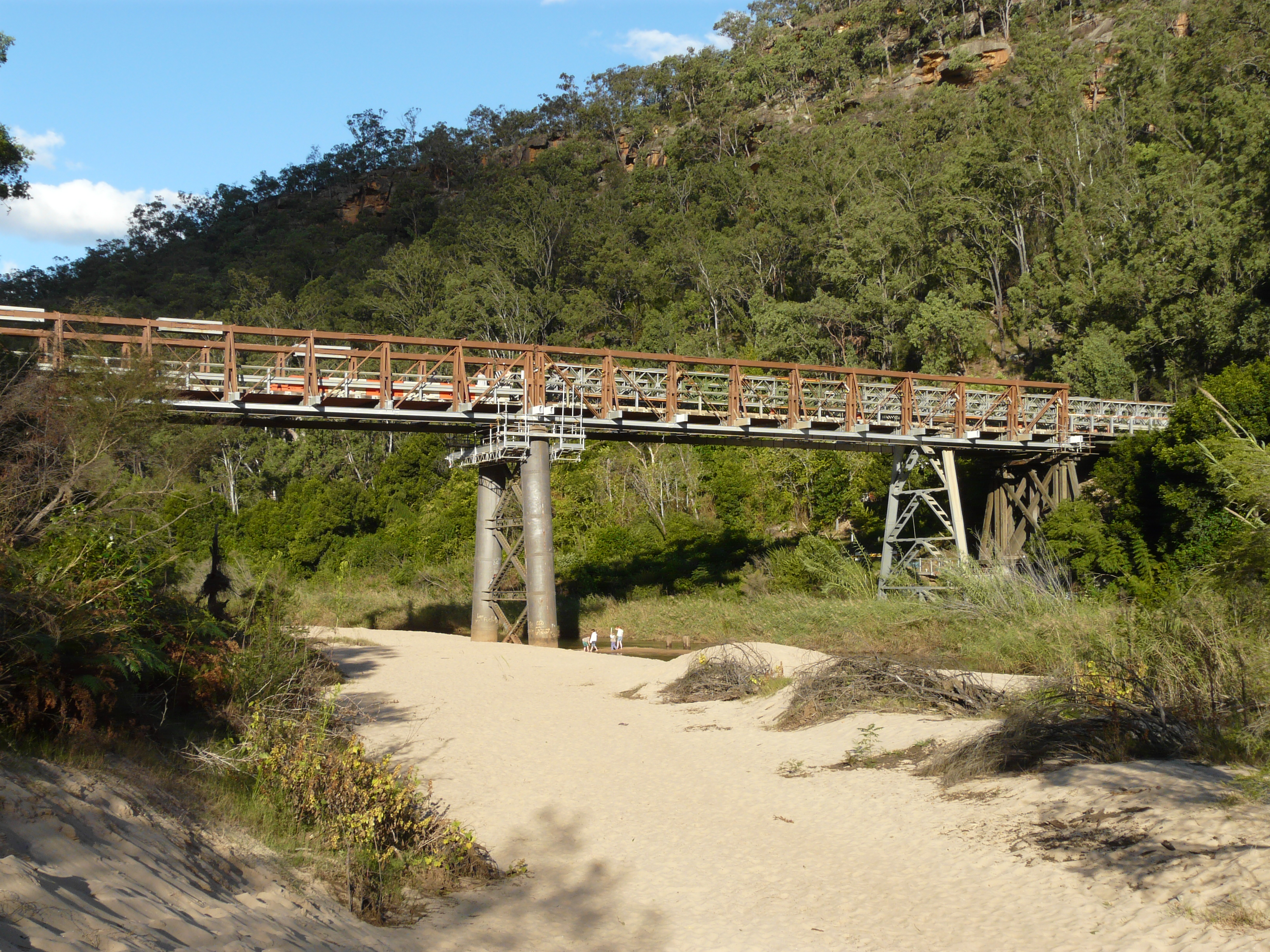
- MacDonald River Bridge in St Albans, in 2009
- Coordinates: 33°17′39″S 150°58′21″E
- Carries: Main Road
- Crosses: MacDonald River
- Locale: St Albans, New South Wales, Australia
- Other name: Norton Bridge
- Owner: Transport for NSW

Characteristics
- Design: Truss bridge
- Material: Timber
- Pier construction: Tapered cylindrical iron, with metal cross bracing
- Total length: 116.1 metres (381 ft)
- Width: 4.6 metres (15 ft)
- Longest span: 36 metres (118 ft)
- No. of spans: Two
- Piers in water: Two
- No. of lanes: One

History
- Engineering design by: Ernest de Burgh
- Constructed by: John Ahearn & Son, Burwood
- Construction start: 1901
- Construction end: 1903
- Construction cost: A£7290 6s 11d

New South Wales Heritage Register
- Official name: St. Albans Bridge over MacDonald River; St Albans Bridge; deBurgh Truss Bridge
- Type: State heritage (built)
- Designated: 20 June 2000
- Reference no.: 1480
- Type: Road Bridge
- Category: Transport – Land
- Builders: John Ahearn & Son, Burwood

Location
- Interactive map of MacDonald River Bridge

The MacDonald River bridge is a heritage-listed road bridge that carries St Albans Road (as Main Road) across the MacDonald River at St Albans, New South Wales, Australia. It was designed by Ernest de Burgh and built by John Ahearn and Son. It is also known as Norton Bridge. The property is owned by Transport for NSW. It was added to the New South Wales State Heritage Register on 20 June 2000.

== History ==
Timber truss road bridges have played a significant role in the expansion and improvement of the NSW road network. Prior to the bridges being built, river crossings were often dangerous in times of rain, which caused bulk freight movement to be prohibitively expensive for most agricultural and mining produce. Only the high priced wool clip of the time was able to carry the costs and inconvenience imposed by the generally inadequate river crossings that often existed prior to the trusses construction.

Timber truss bridges were preferred by the NSW Public Works Department from the mid 19th to the early 20th century because they were relatively cheap to construct, and used mostly local materials. The financially troubled governments of the day applied pressure to the Public Works Department to produce as much road and bridge work for as little cost as possible, using local materials. This condition effectively prohibited the use of iron and steel, as these, prior to the construction of the steel works at Newcastle in the early 20th century, had to be imported from England.

Ernest DeBurgh, the designer of DeBurgh truss and other bridges, was a leading engineer with the Public Works Department, and a prominent figure in early 20th century NSW.

The MacDonald River bridge at St Albans was built between 1901 and 1903 to replace an earlier bridge which had become unsafe. It was built by contractors John Ahearn and Sons of Burwood at a cost of A£7290 6s 11d, under the supervision of the Commissioner for Roads, W. J. Hanna. The bridge opened for traffic in February 1903. It was described upon its opening as "the largest composite truss span without overhead bracing yet erected in the state". It was named "Norton Bridge" at its opening by state Minister for Works Edward William O'Sullivan in honour of MP John Norton, who had been a forceful advocate for the bridge's construction. However, this name is less commonly used in the present day.

== Description ==
The St Albans bridge is a De Burgh type timber truss road bridge. It has two timber truss spans, each of 36 metres (118 ft). There are three approach spans at one end and one at the other. The overall length of the bridge is 116.1 metres (381 ft). The main spans are supported by twin tapered cylindrical iron piers with metal cross bracing. The bridge provides a single lane carriage way with a minimum width of 4.6 metres (15 ft). An Armco guard rail extends the over the majority of the bridge with some of the approach spans having a timber post and rail guard rail.

== Heritage listing ==
Completed in 1902, St Albans Bridge is an early example of a DeBurgh timber truss road bridge. In 1998 it was in good condition.

As a timber truss road bridge, it has many associational links with important historical events, trends, and people, including the expansion of the road network and economic activity throughout NSW, and Ernest DeBurgh, the designer of this type of truss.

DeBurgh trusses were fourth in the five stage design evolution of NSW timber truss road bridges. Designed by Public Works engineer Ernest M. DeBurgh, the DeBurgh truss is an adaptation of the American Pratt truss design. The DeBurgh truss is the first to use significant amounts of steel and iron, and did so in spite of its high cost and the government's historical preference for timber.

The St Albans bridge is a representative example of DeBurgh timber truss road bridges, and is assessed as being Nationally significant, primarily on the basis of its technical and historical significance.

St Albans Bridge over MacDonald River was listed on the New South Wales State Heritage Register on 20 June 2000 having satisfied the following criteria.

The place is important in demonstrating the course, or pattern, of cultural or natural history in New South Wales.

Through the bridge's association with the expansion of the NSW road network, its ability to demonstrate historically important concepts such as the gradual acceptance of NSW people of American design ideas, and its association with Ernest DeBurgh, it has historical significance.

The place is important in demonstrating aesthetic characteristics and/or a high degree of creative or technical achievement in New South Wales.

The bridge exhibits the technical excellence of its design, as all of the structural detail is clearly visible. It is also visually attractive in its setting, and with ornate iron piers, the bridge has substantial aesthetic significance.

The place has a strong or special association with a particular community or cultural group in New South Wales for social, cultural or spiritual reasons.

St Albans bridge is highly valued by the local community. Situated near a popular pub and regular stop off area for tourists from nearby Sydney, the bridge is also valued by the many visitors to the area. Timber truss bridges are prominent to road travellers, and NSW has in the past been referred to as the "timber truss bridge state". Through this, the complete set of bridges gain some social significance, as they could be said to be held in reasonable esteem by many travellers in NSW.

The place has potential to yield information that will contribute to an understanding of the cultural or natural history of New South Wales.

The bridge has technical significance because it is a DeBurgh truss, is representative of a range of major technical developments that were made in timber truss design by the Public Works Department. The St Albans bridge has the largest DeBurgh truss spans constructed, giving it further technical significance.

The place possesses uncommon, rare or endangered aspects of the cultural or natural history of New South Wales.

The bridge is rare in the Sydney region, and has rare technical features.

The place is important in demonstrating the principal characteristics of a class of cultural or natural places/environments in New South Wales.

The bridge is highly representative of De Burgh trusses.

== See also ==
- Historic bridges of New South Wales
- List of bridges in Australia
