= Webbs Creek =

Coordinates: 33°20′S 150°46′E

Webbs

Location
- Country: Australia
- State: New South Wales
- Region: Sydney Basin (IBRA), Outer Metropolitan Sydney
- Municipality: City of Hawkesbury

Physical characteristics
- Source: Womerah Range
  - location: near Mile Ridge
  - elevation: 273 m (896 ft)
- Mouth: confluence with Hawkesbury River
  - location: near Wisemans Ferry
  - elevation: 36 m (118 ft)
- Length: 40 km (25 mi)

Basin features
- River system: Hawkesbury-Nepean catchment
- Tributaries
  - right: Budda Creek, Rush Creek, Doyles Hollow
- State conservation area: Parr SCA

The Webbs Creek, a perennial stream of the Hawkesbury-Nepean catchment, is located in the Outer Metropolitan Sydney region of New South Wales, Australia.

== Course ==
The Webbs Creek (officially designated as a river) rises below the Womerah Range, near the Devils Hole in remote country within the Parr State Conservation Area. The river flows generally north-east by east before reaching its confluence with the Hawkesbury River, south-west of Wisemans Ferry. The river descends 271 metres (889 ft) over its 40-kilometre (25 mi) course.

== See also ==
- List of rivers of Australia
- List of rivers in New South Wales (L-Z)
- Rivers of New South Wales
- Webbs Creek Ferry
