= The Hawkesbury Chronicle and Farmers' Advocate =

Defunct weekly Australian newspaper

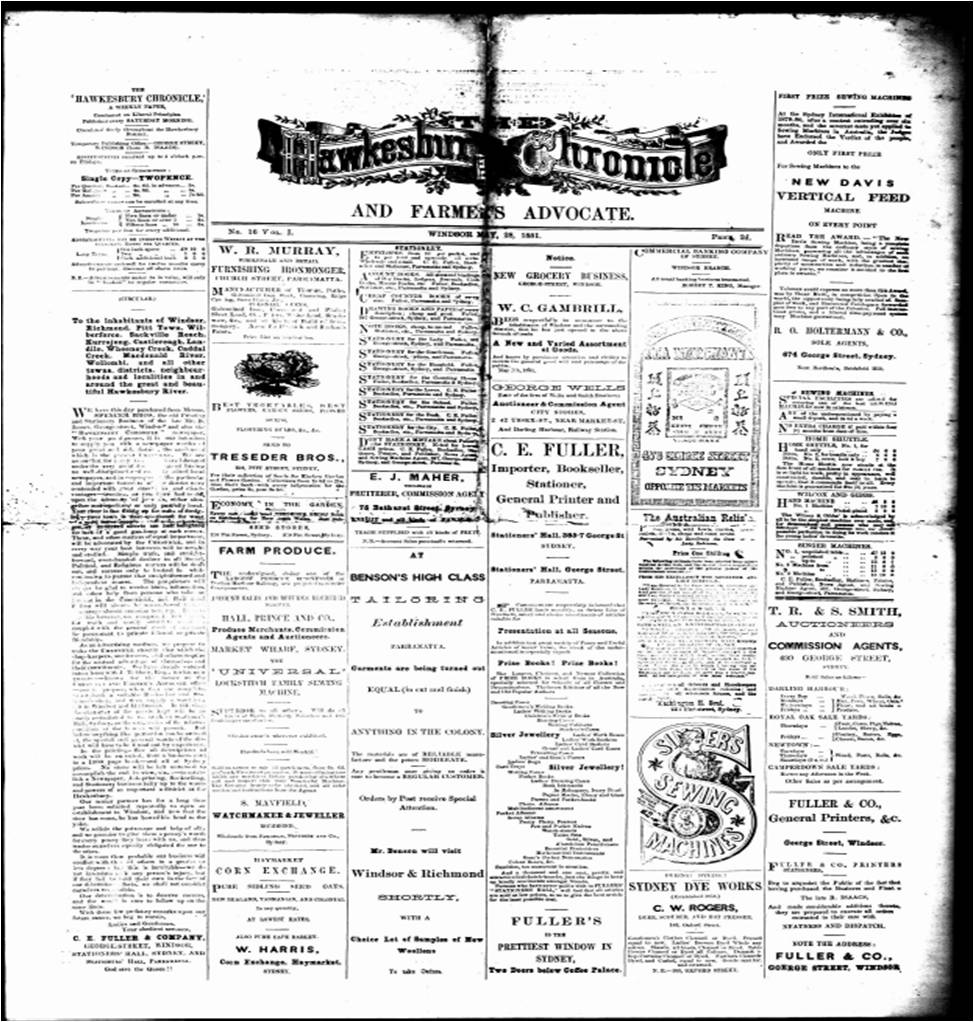
Hawkesbury Chronicle and Farmers' Advocate 28 May 1881

The Hawkesbury Chronicle and Farmers' Advocate was a weekly English language newspaper published in Windsor, New South Wales between 1881 and 1888. The newspaper notes its publication as "conducted on Liberal principles", "bound to no Individual, Sect, or Party but works for the good of all". It was distributed freely throughout the Hawkesbury district each Saturday morning.

== History ==
First published on 12 February 1881 by Fuller & Co., The Hawkesbury Chronicle and Farmers' Advocate was distributed until 26 May 1888.

== Digitisation ==
The paper has been digitised as part of the Australian Newspapers Digitisation Program project of the National Library of Australia.

== See also ==
- List of newspapers in Australia
- List of newspapers in New South Wales
