= OSHC =

OSHC may refer to:

- Out of School Hours Care
- Overseas Student Health Cover
