= 2024 Hawkesbury City Council election =

- 14 September 2024

All 12 seats on Hawkesbury City Council 7 seats needed for a majority
- Registered: 50,010
- Turnout: 84.3%
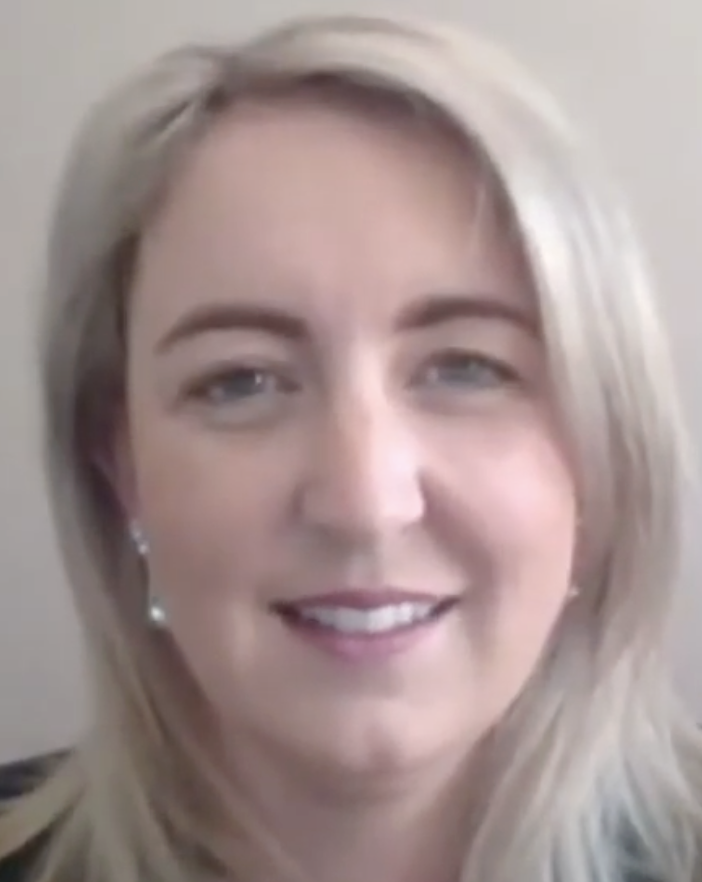

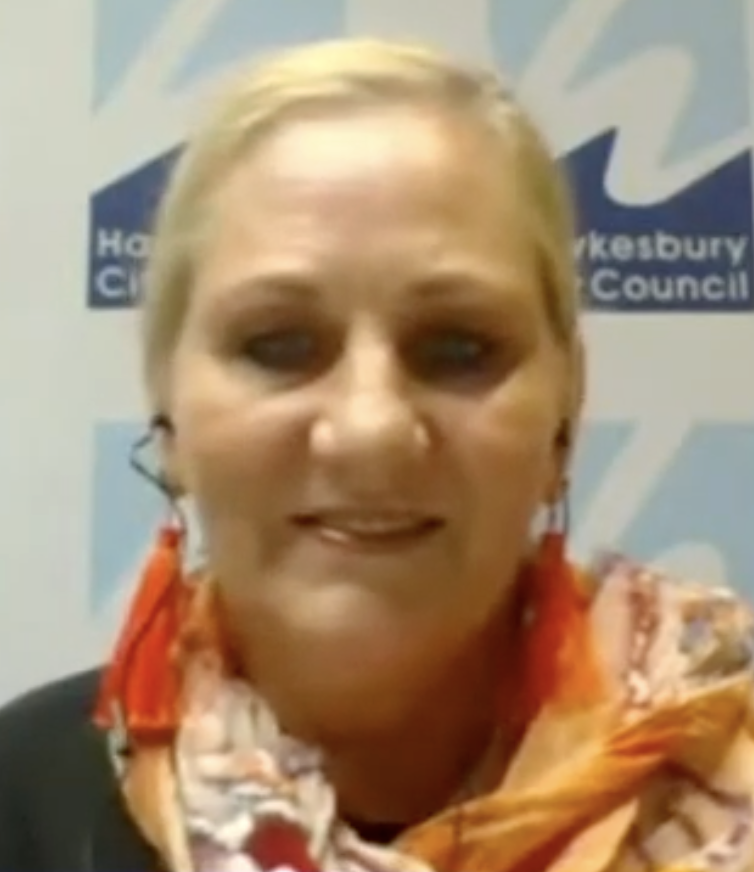

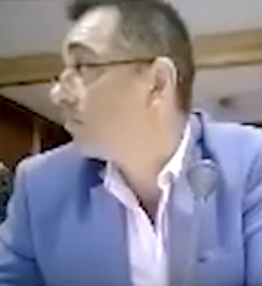

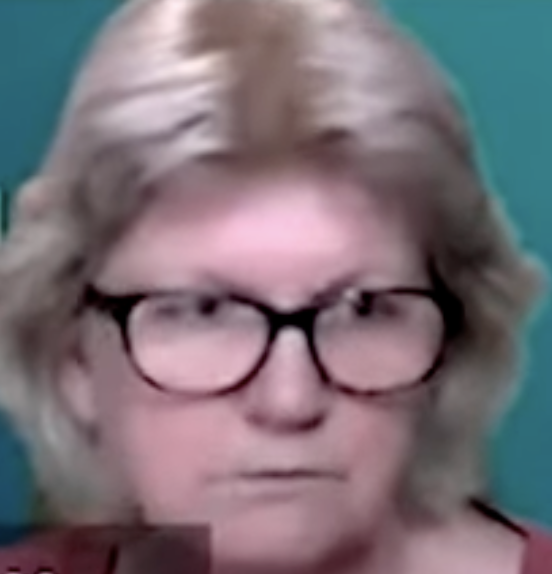

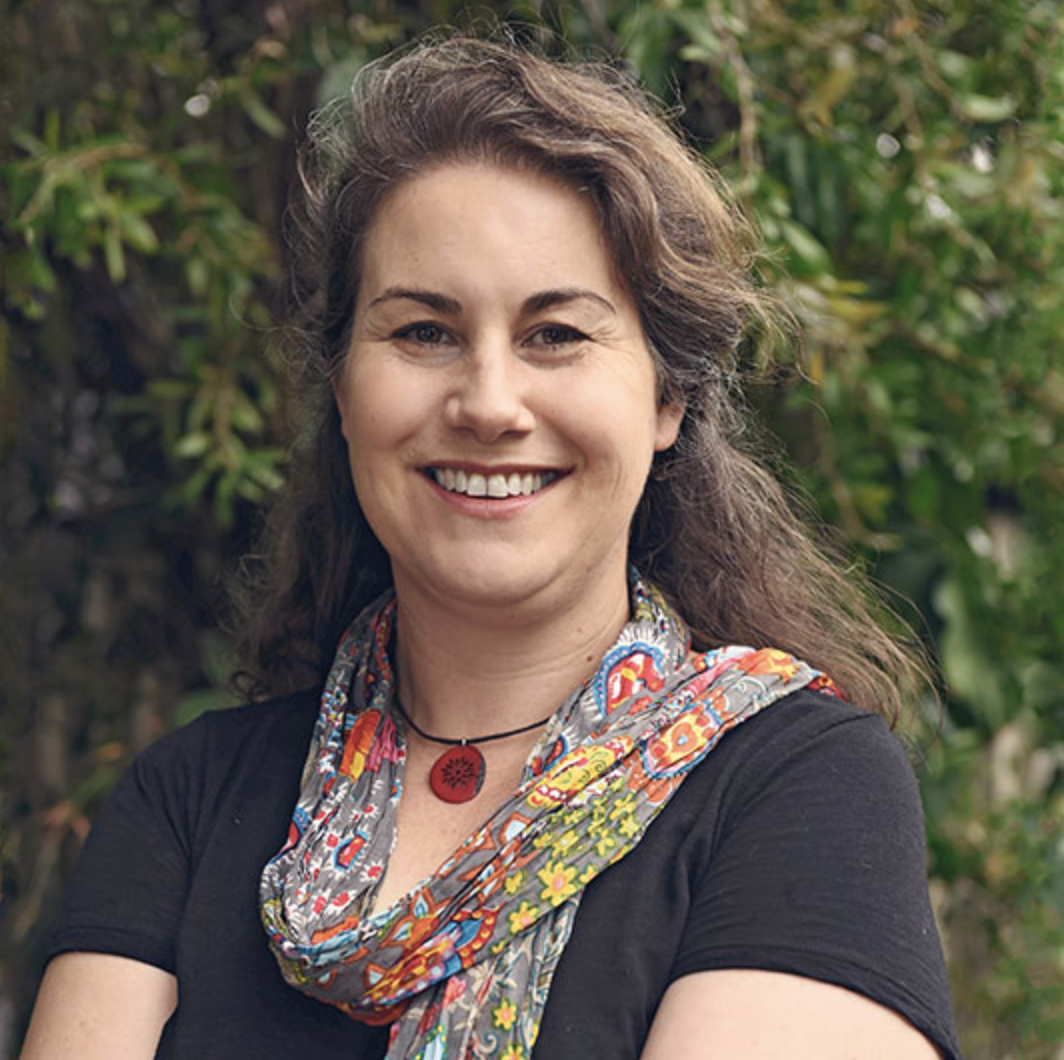

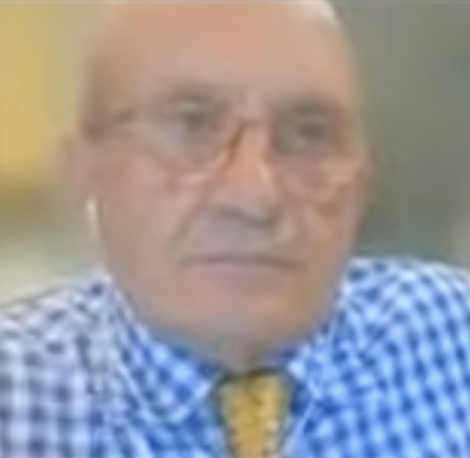
	First party	Second party	Third party
Leader	Sarah McMahon	Mary Lyons-Buckett	Shane Djuric
Party	Liberal	People Not Parties	Shooters
Last election	4 seats	1 seat	1 seat
Seats before	4	1	1
Seats won	4	2	1
Seat change	Steady	▲1	Steady
Primary vote	10,997	4,879	4,529
Percentage	27.3%	12.1%	11.2%
Swing	▼7.1	▲2.4	▲4.1
	Fourth party	Fifth party	Sixth party
Leader	Amanda Kotlash	Danielle Wheeler	Eddie Dogramaci
Party	Labor	Greens	Small Business
Last election	2 seats	1 seat	1 seat
Seats before	2	1	1
Seats won	1	1	1
Seat change	▼1	Steady	Steady
Primary vote	4,337	3,930	3,474
Percentage	10.7%	9.7%	8.6%
Swing	▼1.4	▲2.6	▲4.0

The 2024 Hawkesbury City Council election was held on 14 September 2024 to elect twelve councillors to the City of Hawkesbury. The election was held as part of the statewide local government elections in New South Wales.

The Liberal Party retained the four seats it held prior to the election despite a 7.1% decrease in its vote. People Not Parties doubled its seats to two, while two independents from separate groups were also elected. The Shooters, Fishers and Farmers Party, the Labor Party, the Greens and the Small Business Party all won one seat each.

== Background ==
In September 2023, councillor Nathan Zamprogno left the Liberal Party, making claims of bullying and corruption against the party. He was elected in 2016 on the Liberal ticket but recontested his seat without party endorsement in 2021 and was elected with 9.5% of the vote. Zamprogno's support increased in 2024, when he was re-elected with 11.9% of the vote.

== Electoral system ==
Like in all other New South Wales local government areas (LGAs), Hawkesbury City Council elections use optional preferential voting. Under this system, voters are only required to vote for one candidate or group, although they can choose to preference other candidates.

All elections for councillor positions are elected using proportional representation. Hawkesbury has an Australian Senate-style ballot paper with above-the-line and below-the-line voting. The council is composed of a single ward.

The election was conducted by the New South Wales Electoral Commission (NSWEC).

== Retiring councillors ==
=== Labor ===
- Barry Calvert

=== Liberal ===
- Patrick Conolly – announced 29 March 2024

== Candidates ==
Former Labor MP Chris Haviland, who served as the member for Macarthur in the House of Representatives from 1993 until 1996, sought preselection to replace Barry Calvert as Labor's lead candidate but was unsuccessful and received the fifth position on the party's ticket.

This was the only council contested by The Small Business Party in 2024.

Greens (Group A)	People Not Parties (Group B)	Labor (Group C)	Independent (Group D)	Hawkesbury's Future (Group E)
1. Danielle Wheeler; 2. Allister Claasz; 3. Matilda Julian; 4. Debbie Paton; 5. Brian Crowther; 6. Karen Kobier	1. Mary Lyons-Buckett; 2. Thomas Aczel; 3. Emma-Jane Garrow; 4. Peter Ryan; 5. Stacy O'Toole; 6. Richie Benson; 7. Kayte Murphy; 8. Tara Vigouroux	1. Amanda Kotlash; 2. Wendy Davies; 3. Simon Griffin; 4. Anita Artlett; 5. Chris Haviland; 6. Roger Pyke	1. Les Sheather; 2. Andrew Cadman; 3. Kris Waters; 4. Gerard Hodgskin; 5. Dave Coaldrake; 6. Michelle Tapara	1. Bob Gribbin; 2. Melissa Crane; 3. Lynette Brand; 4. Wendy Campbell; 5. Elise Smith; 6. Anton Raunjak
Shooters (Group F)	Independent (Group G)	Independent (Group H)	Liberal (Group I)	Small Business (Group J)
1. Shane Djuric; 2. Bradley McGregor; 3. Brooke Djuric; 4. Stephanie Hill; 5. Keith Levy; 6. Gae Kelly	1. Angela Maguire; 2. Meera Webster; 3. Melanie Carr; 4. James Cleaver; 5. Kirsten Radnuz; 6. John Maguire	1. Nathan Zamprogno; 2. Donna Pellew; 3. David Ball; 4. Philip Price; 5. Joel Baltaks; 6. Jessica Dickinson	1. Sarah McMahon; 2. Mike Creed; 3. Jill Reardon; 4. Paul Veigel; 5. Warwick Mackay; 6. Natasha Bennett	1. Eddie Dogramaci; 2. Rodney Galea; 3. Peter Muscat; 4. Hanif Bismi; 5. Thomas Chiarelli; 6. Esma Dogramaci

== Campaign ==
During the campaign, corflutes for Small Business Party councillor Eddie Dogramaci were torched, torn and doused in acid.

== Results ==
2024 Hawkesbury City Council election
Party	Candidate	Votes	%	±%
Liberal	1. Sarah McMahon (elected 1); 2. Mike Creed (elected 8); 3. Jill Reardon (elected 9); 4. Paul Veigel (elected 12); 5. Warwick Mackay; 6. Natasha Bennett	10,997	27.3	−7.1
People Not Parties	1. Mary Lyons-Buckett (elected 3); 2. Thomas Aczel (elected 10); 3. Emma-Jane Garrow; 4. Peter Ryan; 5. Stacy O'Toole; 6. Richie Benson; 7. Kayte Murphy; 8. Tara Vigouroux	4,879	12.1	+2.4
Independent	1. Nathan Zamprogno (elected 2); 2. Donna Pellew; 3. David Ball; 4. Philip Price; 5. Joel Baltaks; 6. Jessica Dickinson	4,809	11.9	+2.4
Shooters, Fishers, Farmers	1. Shane Djuric (elected 4); 2. Bradley McGregor; 3. Brooke Djuric; 4. Stephanie Hill; 5. Keith Levy; 6. Gae Kelly	4,529	11.2	+4.1
Labor	1. Amanda Kotlash (elected 5); 2. Wendy Davies; 3. Simon Griffin; 4. Anita Artlett; 5. Chris Haviland; 6. Roger Pyke	4,337	10.7	−1.4
Greens	1. Danielle Wheeler (elected 6); 2. Allister Claasz; 3. Matilda Julian; 4. Debbie Paton; 5. Brian Crowther; 6. Karen Kobier	3,930	9.7	+2.6
Small Business	1. Eddie Dogramaci (elected 7); 2. Rodney Galea; 3. Peter Muscat; 4. Hanif Bismi; 5. Thomas Chiarelli; 6. Esma Dogramaci	3,474	8.6	+4.0
Independent	1. Les Sheather (elected 11); 2. Andrew Cadman; 3. Kris Waters; 4. Gerard Hodgskin; 5. Dave Coaldrake; 6. Michelle Tapara	1,692	4.2	−3.2
Independent	1. Angela Maguire; 2. Meera Webster; 3. Melanie Carr; 4. James Cleaver; 5. Kirsten Radnuz; 6. John Maguire	916	2.3	+2.3
Hawkesbury's Future	1. Bob Gribbin; 2. Melissa Crane; 3. Lynette Brand; 4. Wendy Campbell; 5. Elise Smith; 6. Anton Raunjak	785	2.0	+2.0
Total formal votes		40,348	93.5	
Informal votes		2,808	6.5	
Turnout		43,156	86.3	

=== Results summary ===
2024 Hawkesbury City Council election: Results summary
Party	Votes	%	Swing	Seats	Change
Liberal	10,997	27.3	−7.1	4	Steady
Independents	7,417	18.4		2	Steady
People Not Parties	4,879	12.1	+2.4	2	▲1
Shooters, Fishers, Farmers	4,529	11.2	+4.1	1	Steady
Labor	4,337	10.7	−1.4	1	▼1
Greens	3,930	9.7	+2.6	1	Steady
Small Business	3,474	8.6	+4.0	1	Steady
Hawkesbury's Future	785	2.0	+2.0	0	Steady
Formal votes	40,348	93.5			
Informal votes	2,808	6.5			
Total	43,156	100.0		12	
Registered voters / turnout	50,010	86.3			
