= Central Macdonald =

Village in New South Wales, Australia

Central Macdonald Sydney, New South Wales
- Coordinates: 33°19′55″S 150°58′30″E
- Population: 49 (SAL 2021)
- Postcode(s): 2775
- Location: 86.4 km (54 mi) from Sydney CBD
- LGA(s): City of Hawkesbury
- State electorate(s): Hawkesbury
- Federal division(s): Macquarie
Suburbs around Central Macdonald:
St Albans	St Albans	Wrights Creek
St Albans	Central Macdonald	Ten Mile Hollow
Lower Macdonald	Lower Macdonald	Lower Macdonald

Central Macdonald is a village in the City of Hawkesbury, in the state of New South Wales, Australia. Macdonald Valley Public School is situated in the village. It was previously known as the village of Benton.
