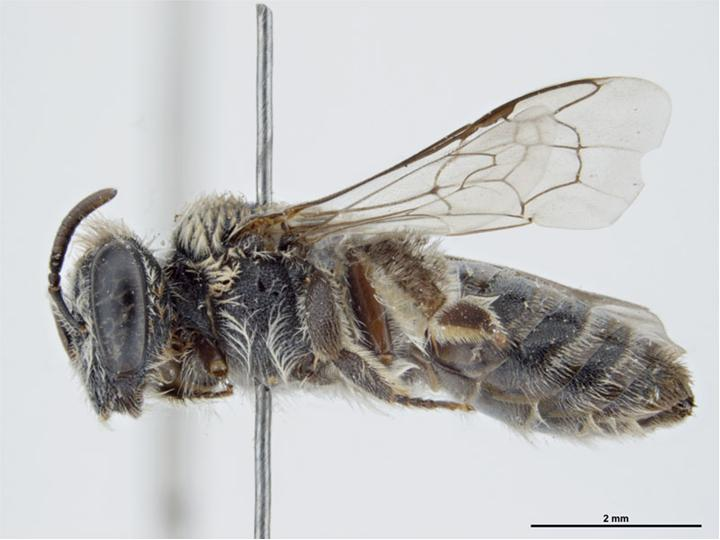
- Female

Scientific classification
- Kingdom: Animalia
- Phylum: Arthropoda
- Clade: Pancrustacea
- Class: Insecta
- Order: Hymenoptera
- Family: Colletidae
- Genus: Leioproctus
- Species: L. fallax

Binomial name
- Leioproctus fallax (Cockerell, 1921)

Synonyms
- Paracolletes fallax Cockerell, 1921

= Leioproctus fallax =

Species of bee

Leioproctus fallax, or Leioproctus (Protomorpha) fallax, is a species of bee in the family Colletidae and subfamily Colletinae. It is endemic to Australia. It was described by British-American entomologist Theodore Dru Alison Cockerell in 1921.

== Description ==
Female body length is about 9 mm. Colouration is mainly black with white, grey and red hair.

== Distribution and habitat ==
The species occurs in eastern Australia. The type locality is Bribie Island in south-eastern Queensland. It has also been recorded from Coonabarabran, Mellong Swamp and Marramarra National Park in New South Wales.

== Behaviour ==
The adults are flying mellivores.
