= Womerah =

- Suburb
- Coordinates: 33°13′57″S 150°48′7″E
- Country: Australia
- State: New South Wales
- City: Sydney
- LGA: City of Hawkesbury

Government
  - State electorate: Hawkesbury
  - Federal division: Greenway
- Postcode: 2756

Womerah is a suburb of Sydney, within the Hawkesbury electorate of the state of New South Wales, Australia.
