= The Devils Wilderness =

- Suburb
- Interactive map of The Devils Wilderness
- Coordinates: 33°32′39″S 150°32′9″E
- Country: Australia
- State: New South Wales
- LGA: City of Hawkesbury

Government
  - State electorate: Hawkesbury
  - Federal division: Greenway

Population
  - Total: 0 (SAL 2016)
- Postcode: 2750

The Devils Wilderness is a suburb of Sydney, within the Hawkesbury electorate of the state of New South Wales, Australia.
