= The Small Business Party =

Political party in New South Wales, Australia

- Abbreviation: SBP
- Leader: Eddie Dogramaci
- Founder: Angela Vithoulkas
- Founded: 2017
- Preceded by: Sydney Matters Independent Team
- Headquarters: Sydney
- Ideology: Small business advocacy Neoliberalism
- Political position: Centre-right
- Hawkesbury City Council: 1 / 12

Website
- https://thesmallbusinessparty.com

The Small Business Party (SBP) is a political party in New South Wales, Australia. Their party advocates for the small business sector. The party was founded in 2017 by Angela Vithoulkas, a City of Sydney councillor and café operator.

The party claims that the major parties focus too much on larger businesses and ignore the smaller ones, even though the vast majority are small businesses. The party's platform mostly focuses on lowering taxes associated with business; they also advocate for better education and out of school care for children. They also have a policy to cut immigration, as the party claims that the infrastructure in New South Wales is inadequate for sustaining immigration.

The federal party was deregistered on 23 August 2021 due to the party ceasing to have at least 500 members but remained registered with the New South Wales Electoral Commission.

The party contested the 2021 New South Wales local government elections, with Eddie Dogramaci winning a seat on Hawkesbury City Council.

At the 2023 New South Wales state election, the SBP was the only registered party not to contest the Legislative Council. Dogramaci was the party's sole nominee at the election, running in the Legislative Assembly seat of Hawkesbury, where he received less than 4% of the vote. As of April 2024, the New South Wales state party remains registered.
