= Mount Yengo =

Mountain in New South Wales, Australia

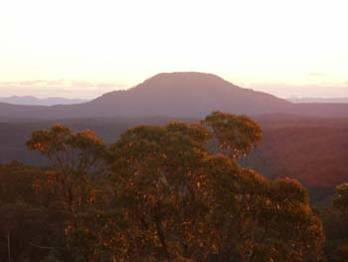
- Mount Yengo

Highest point
- Elevation: 668 m (2,192 ft)
- Coordinates: 32°58′54″S 150°51′04″E

Geography
- Location within New South Wales
- Location: Lower Hunter region, New South Wales, Australia
- Parent range: Calore Range, Great Dividing Range

Mount Yengo is a mountain that is located in the Lower Hunter region of New South Wales, in eastern Australia. The 668-metre (2,192 ft) mountain is part of the Calore Range, part of the Great Dividing Range, and is situated within the Yengo National Park, approximately 3 kilometres (1.9 mi) east of the Macdonald River and 17 kilometres (11 mi) east by south of Putty.

== Significance to Indigenous Australians ==
Mount Yengo is a natural feature of spiritual and ceremonial importance to the Wonnarua, Awabakal, Worimi and Darkinjung Indigenous Australians. According to indigenous mythology, Mount Yengo is the place from which Baiame, a creational ancestral hero, jumped back up to the spirit world after he had created all of the mountains, lakes, rivers and caves in the area. Baiame flattened the top of Mount Yengo when he jumped skyward and the flat top is still visible today.

== Access ==
Mount Yengo is within The Big Yango precinct, which has locked gates and requires permit to enter. The key is included in bookings of campsites and/or hotels in the precinct.

== See also ==
- List of mountains in New South Wales
