= Webbs Creek, New South Wales =

Webbs Creek Sydney, New South Wales
- Coordinates: 33°21′S 150°56′E
- Population: 55 (2021 census)
- Postcode(s): 2775
- Elevation: 7 m (23 ft)
- Location: 77 km (48 mi) from Sydney CBD; 80 km (50 mi) from Gosford
- LGA(s): City of Hawkesbury
- State electorate(s): Hawkesbury
- Federal division(s): Macquarie
Suburbs around Webbs Creek:
Colo Heights	Central Macdonald	Lower Macdonald
Cumberland Reach	Webbs Creek	Wisemans Ferry
Lower Portland	Leets Vale	South Maroota

Webbs Creek is a scattered village of Sydney, in the state of New South Wales, Australia. It is located in the City of Hawkesbury north-west of Wisemans Ferry. It is bounded in the south-west by the Hawkesbury River and is traversed by the creek from which it is named.

Webbs Creek's population at the 2006 census was 204. Its population was not calculated at the 2011 census.
