= Fernances =

- Suburb
- Interactive map of Fernances
- Coordinates: 33°12′1″S 150°59′46″E
- Country: Australia
- State: New South Wales
- City: Sydney
- LGA: City of Hawkesbury

Government
  - State electorate: Hawkesbury
  - Federal division: Greenway

Population
  - Total: 7 (2021 census)
- Postcode: 2775

Fernances is a suburb of Sydney, within the City of Hawkesbury in the state of New South Wales, Australia.

== Demographics ==
As of the 2021 Australian census, 7 people resided in Fernances, down from 13 in the 2016 census. The median age of persons in Fernances was 62 years. There were fewer males than females, with 30.8% of the population male and 69.2% female. The average household size was 1.1 people per household.
