= Putty, New South Wales =

Putty New South Wales
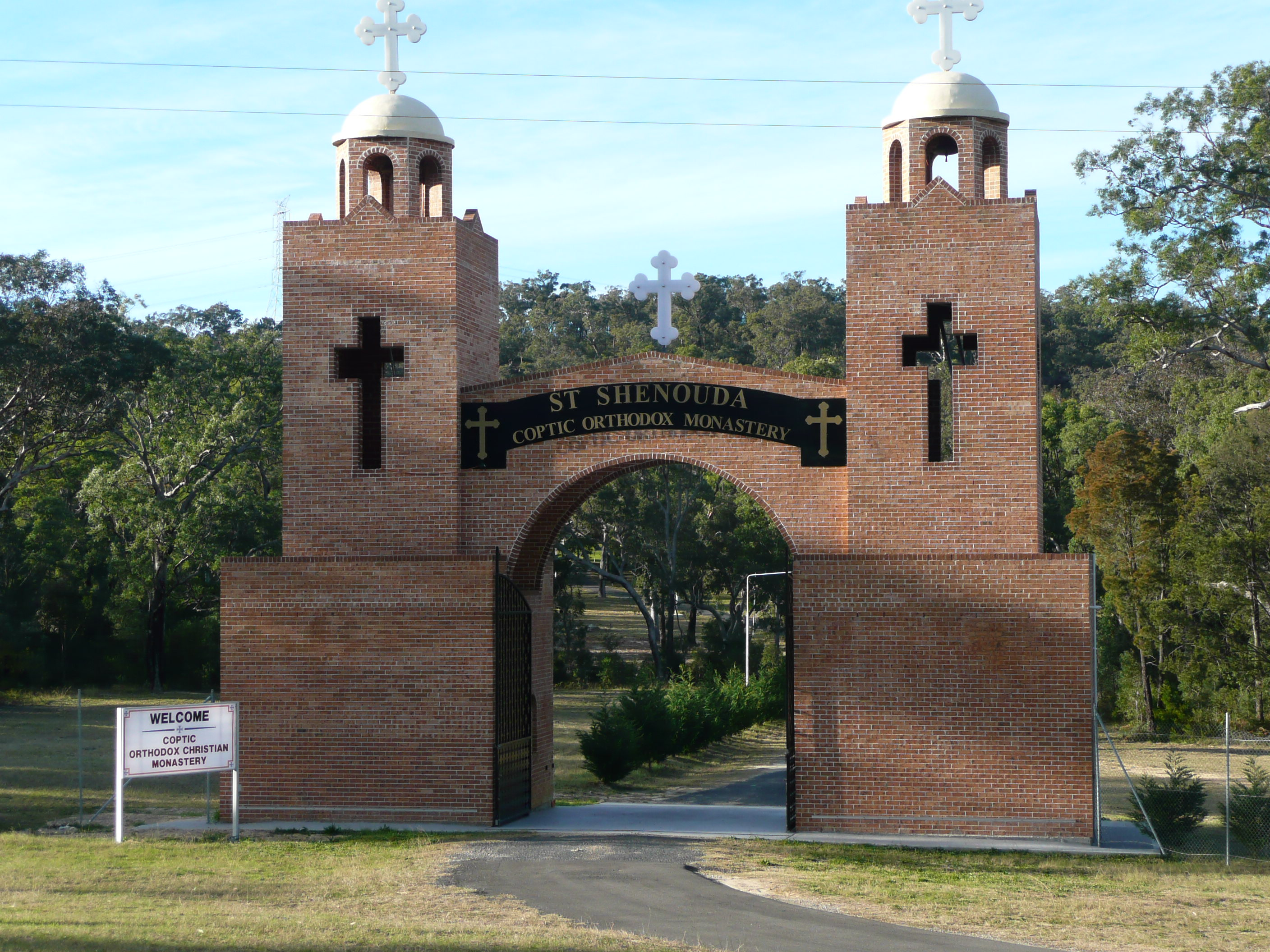
- Saint Shenouda Coptic Monastery

- Coordinates: 32°58′S 150°40′E
- Population: 126 (SAL 2021)
- LGA(s): Singleton Council; City of Hawkesbury
- State electorate(s): Upper Hunter
- Federal division(s): Hunter
Localities around Putty:
Wollemi Creek	Martindale, New South Wales	Garland Valley, New South Wales
Wollemi	Putty	Mount Yengo
Wirraba, New South Wales	Mellong	Macdonald River (St Albans)

Putty is a village in New South Wales, Australia in Singleton Shire. It is north west of Sydney on the Putty Road between Windsor and Singleton.

== Geography ==
The village lies in a wide valley. The knee-deep Putty Creek, or the Tupa, rises in north at the foot of Mt Kindarun, and runs the length of the valley before joining with the Wollemi Creek which then feeds into the Colo River.

Adjoining the Putty Road (State Route 69) at a distance of 81 kilometres (50 mi) from Singleton and 91 kilometres (57 mi) from Windsor, Putty Valley Road services the northern stretch of the valley, while the recently relocated Box Gap Road services the south western end.

Land holdings in the area extend to the boundaries of the Wollemi National Park in the west and south, the Putty State Forest in the north and the Yengo National Park in the East.

== Commerce ==
While the number of large land holdings in Putty are diminishing to make way for smaller hobby farms, livestock production (primarily beef cattle) continues on a small scale.

A saw mill located on the eastern side of the Putty Road produces sawn timber from locally cut raw materials.

Local trades and services include an earth moving business, a building/construction business, a Licensed Plumber, Drainer & Gas Fitter.

== Infrastructure ==
Town water and sewerage are not available at Putty. A 22,000 volt electrical distribution line runs into the valley, but many residents in outlying dwellings rely on solar power and generators due to the distance back to the main line. The telephone system is serviced by a local automatic exchange.

In September 2006 Telstra commissioned a 3G/CDMA mobile tower near the Putty Road adjacent to the Putty Valley Road turnoff.

Only one terrestrial television signal (Newcastle based NBN) is of a usable quality in some parts of the valley. Residents must rely on satellite services for more variety.

The closest retail outlet was the Garland Valley Roadhouse, 12 km (7 mi) north of Putty, although the roadhouse really only catered for travellers. It was destroyed by fire on 1 August 2009. Residents of Putty must travel to Windsor or Singleton for food, clothing and agricultural supplies.

A recent addition to the Putty scene has been the Saint Shenouda Coptic Orthodox Monastery situated on the Putty Road.

Another addition in 2011 is the Grey Gum Cafe on the Singleton/Putty Road, 6 km south of the Putty turnoff. Coffee, hot meals, toilets and a shower block for travellers are available.

== Social and activities ==
Community groups include:

- New South Wales Rural Fire Service Putty brigade.
- The Putty Community Association (PCA) which currently operates the Putty Community Hall.
- The hall is an historic building that stands on land donated for the purpose, and as the land title deeds dated 1918 state: "Upon trust for the use of the residents of Putty for Public, Religious and Social gatherings and for such other purposes as the said residents may from time to time determine...". The hall has undergone a continual restoration over the last 20 years, using volunteer labour and funds donated or raised during social events.
- The Hall is used as a Church on the second and fourth Sunday mornings of each week with Eucharists, Bible Study and Sunday School being provided by the local Anglican Priest from the Anglican Communities of Our Lady.
- The PCA hosts several annual events at the hall, including an Anzac day service, a Christmas gathering, a Christmas in July, and the "Biggest Morning Tea" to raise money for cancer research. The major social event is the Putty Spring Fair, held at the hall usually on a weekend-day in September. Various information and training sessions are also held at the Community Hall from time to time.
- The hall also serves as a place of refuge during times of local disaster. Bushfire and flood can quickly isolate the town making a return home impossible if caught on the wrong side. For such occasions, the PCA operates an emergency satellite phone in the event of a failure of the local telephone system.
- Putty's proximity to the Wollemi National Park means it is sometimes used as a starting or finishing point for treks. Hikers often utilise old logging trails that make it possible to walk through the national park on trips of eighty kilometres or more.
