= Bucketty =

Bucketty New South Wales
- Coordinates: 33°6′24″S 151°8′4″E
- Population: 186 (2016 census)
- Postcode(s): 2250
- Time zone: AEST (UTC+10)
  - Summer (DST): AEDT (UTC+11)
- Location: 105 km (65 mi) N of Sydney; 122 km (76 mi) NNE of Windsor; 53 km (33 mi) SSW of Cessnock
- LGA(s): Cessnock City Council
- Region: Hunter
- County: Northumberland
- Parish: Lockyer
- State electorate(s): Upper Hunter
- Federal division(s): Hunter

Bucketty is a locality in the City of Cessnock local government area (LGA), in New South Wales, Australia. It is in the south of the LGA, immediately adjacent to the border with the City of Hawkesbury and Central Coast Council, in the Hunter Region, about 105 km (65 mi) north of Sydney, and 55 km (34 mi) from Cessnock, New South Wales, the council seat. Bucketty is presumably the Aboriginal word for mountain spring.

Bucketty is situated on a ridge of ironstone hills separating Yengo National Park from the Central Coast.

Bucketty has no services and the nearest general stores are located in Laguna and Kulnura. The New South Wales Rural Fire Service maintains the Bucketty & District Rural Fire Brigade and the Fire Shed is the social centre of the town. When rural addressing was introduced, the numbering was based on the distance from Broke, and some of the streets were also given names.

== Background ==
Bucketty and the surrounding bushland contains some of the country's most significant Aboriginal sites, including Mt Yengo. In the early 1800s pioneers settled in Murrays Run, and one of the most significant roads of the colony, the 220 km-long (136 mi) Great North Road between Sydney and Newcastle, was built using convict labour. Sambar deer are a common sight. The current community of Bucketty (186 people) was only established in 1972. It was in Bucketty that the Convict Trail Project was conceived – a heritage initiative that manages the restoration, maintenance and promotion of the convict-built road. The community is also involved in the Wombat Rescue Project which has attracted national attention and has an MoU with the NPWS to self-manage the Convict Wall site that is part of the Yengo National Park. This site is a focal point for community activities, such as the Concerts under the Stars and the annual Carols by Candlelight. The community has received several awards for its various activities and initiatives .
