= Mogo Creek =

Coordinates: 33°10′S 151°02′E

Mogo Wallambine Creek
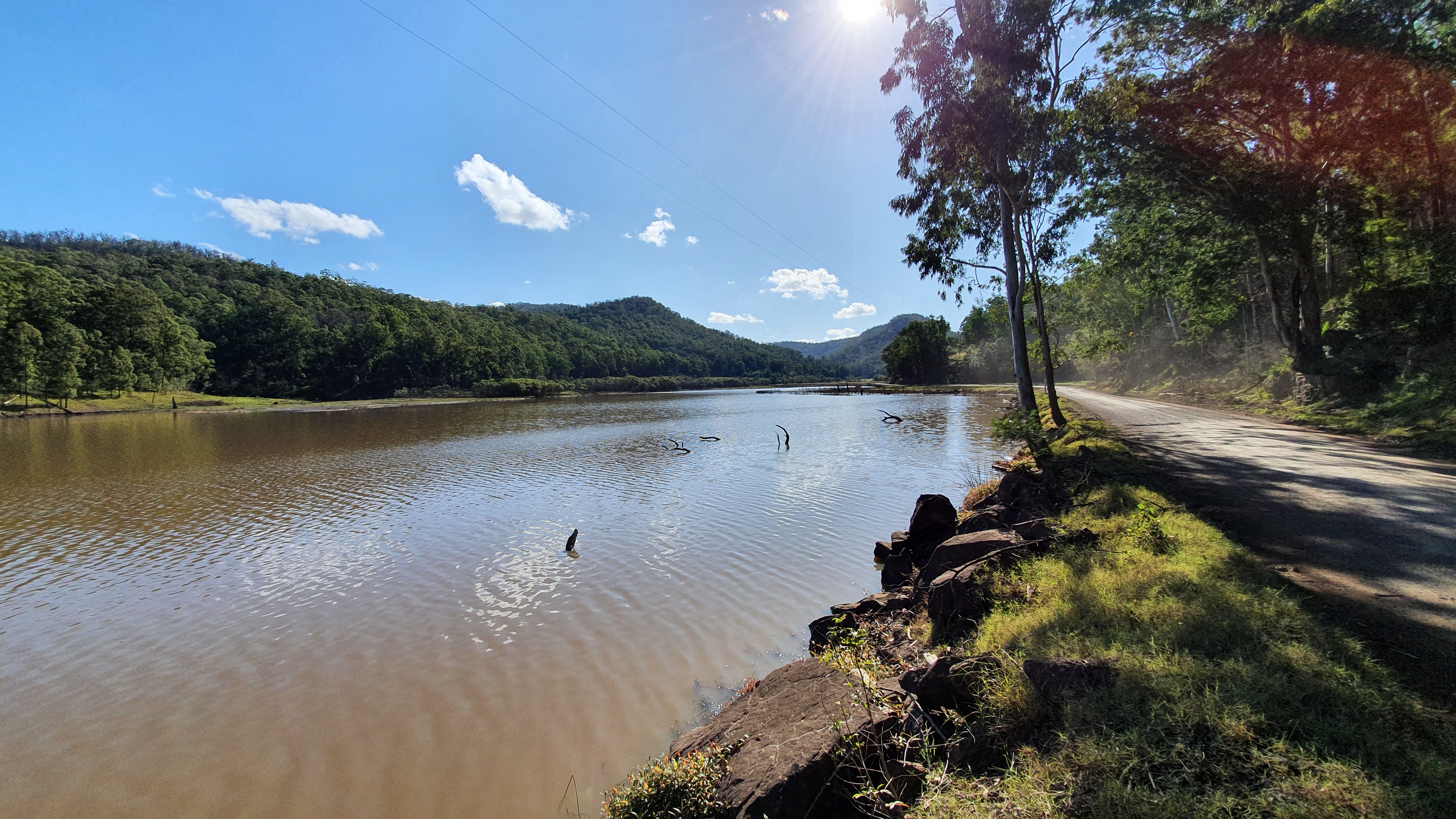
- Mogo Creek

Location
- Country: Australia
- State: New South Wales
- Region: Sydney Basin (IBRA), Outer Metropolitan Sydney
- Municipality: City of Hawkesbury

Physical characteristics
- Source: Mount Finch, Hunter Range
  - location: near Mount McQuoid
  - elevation: 213 m (699 ft)
- Mouth: confluence with the Macdonald River
  - location: north of St Albans
  - elevation: 5 m (16 ft)
- Length: 31 km (19 mi)

Basin features
- River system: Hawkesbury-Nepean catchment
- Tributaries
  - left: Little Mogo Creek
  - right: Broad Arm

The Mogo Creek, a perennial stream of the Hawkesbury-Nepean catchment, is located in the Blue Mountains region of New South Wales, Australia.

== Course ==
The Mogo Creek (officially designated as a river) rises below Mount Finch on the southern slopes of the Hunter Range, about 5 kilometres (3.1 mi) north-west of Mount McQuoid. The river flows generally south, then west, then south, joined by two minor tributaries, before reaching its confluence with the Macdonald River near St Albans Common, north of St Albans. The river descends 208 metres (682 ft) over its 31-kilometre (19 mi) course.

== See also ==
- List of rivers of Australia
- List of rivers in New South Wales (L-Z)
- Rivers of New South Wales
