= Wisemans Ferry, New South Wales =

Wisemans Ferry
- Suburb
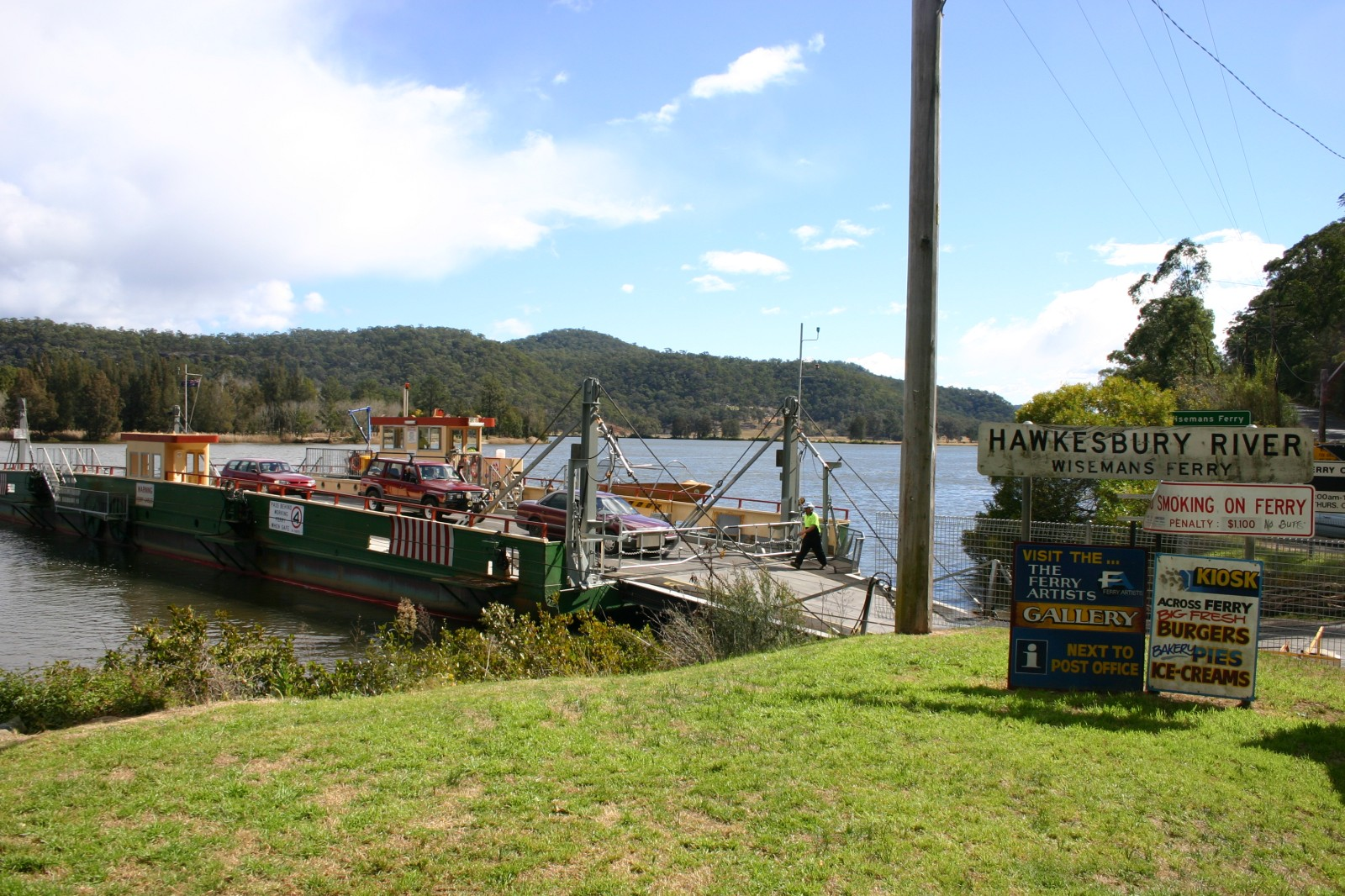
- The ferry over the Hawkesbury River

- Interactive map of Wisemans Ferry
- Coordinates: 33°22′55″S 150°59′06″E
- Country: Australia
- State: New South Wales
- LGAs: Hornsby Shire; The Hills Shire; City of Hawkesbury; Central Coast Council
- Location: 75 km (47 mi) NNW of Sydney; 44 km (27 mi) NNE of Windsor; 78 km (48 mi) W of Gosford
- Established: 1827

Government
  - State electorates: Gosford; Hornsby; Hawkesbury
  - Federal division: Berowra, Macquarie, Robertson
- Elevation: 10 m (33 ft)

Population
  - Total: 233 (SAL 2021)
- Postcode: 2775
- Parish: Cornelia, Frederick
Suburbs around Wisemans Ferry
Colo Heights	Lower Macdonald	Lower Macdonald
Webbs Creek	Wisemans Ferry	Gunderman
Leets Vale	Maroota	Laughtondale

Wisemans Ferry is a town on the northern outskirts of Sydney and the south-west of the Central Coast region in the state of New South Wales, Australia, located 75 kilometres north north-west of Sydney. It is located in the Sydney local government areas of the Hornsby Shire, The Hills Shire, City of Hawkesbury and the Central Coast Council. The town is a tourist spot with picnic and barbecue facilities. As well as a rich convict and colonial heritage in the area, the Dharug National Park and Yengo National Park are close by.

== History ==
The town was originally called Lower Portland Headland, but the name was eventually changed to Wisemans Ferry, named after Solomon Wiseman, a former convict (1777–1838), who received a land grant in the area from Governor Macquarie in 1817. Wiseman established a ferry service on the Hawkesbury River in 1827 for the transport of produce and provisions to the convicts building the Great North Road and was known to many as King of the Hawkesbury.

Wisemans Ferry Post Office opened on 1 January 1857.

There is information on the early history of Wisemans Ferry in Ball, John and Pam, 'Early Wisemans Ferry: George Mollison, Solomon Wiseman, Bushrangers and Land Title Confusion', Oughtershaw Press, Riverview, 2014 – ISBN 978 0 9593420 9 3.

== Heritage listings ==
Wisemans Ferry & Mount Manning has a number of heritage-listed sites, including:

- Old Great North Road (Devine's Hill to Mount Manning Section)

== Schools ==
Wisemans Ferry Public School was established in 1867.

== Transport ==
Today, two ferry services cross the Hawkesbury River from the town of Wisemans Ferry. The eponymous Wisemans Ferry crosses the river to a point down-stream of its confluence with the Macdonald River, connecting with the old Great North Road. Webbs Creek Ferry crosses to a point upstream of the confluence, connecting with the St Albans Road that follows the west bank of the Macdonald River. There are approximately ten buses per week departing near Wisemans Ferry.

== Bibliography ==
- Aussie Towns. ‘Wiseman’s Ferry’.
- Dictionary of Sydney. ‘Wiseman’s Ferry’.
- Hawkesbury on the Net: Memorials, Monuments and Plaques Register. ‘Convicts and Early History Monument - Wisemans Ferry.’
- NSW Department of Customer Service. ‘Wiseman’s Ferry’.
- NSW National Parks and Wildlife Service. Wisemans Ferry Historic Site Plan of Management. 2010.
- Swancott, Charles. Wiseman’s Ferry. Brisbane Water Historical Society, 1979.
- Webb, Ian. Blood, Sweat & Irons: building the Great North Road from Wisemans Ferry to Mt. Manning 1827 – 1832. Dharug & Lower Hawkesbury Historical Society, 1999.
- Wisemans. ‘Wiseman’s Ferry’.
