= Upper Macdonald =

Upper Macdonald New South Wales
- Coordinates: 33°15′29″S 150°56′31″E
- Population: 42 (SAL 2021)
- Postcode(s): 2775
- Location: 108 km (67 mi) N of Sydney
- LGA(s): City of Hawkesbury
- State electorate(s): Hawkesbury
- Federal division(s): Macquarie

Upper Macdonald is a small village 108 km north of Sydney, in the state of New South Wales, Australia. It is located in the City of Hawkesbury on the Macdonald River (a tributary of the Hawkesbury River) north of St Albans. The village used to be known as Howick.

Upper Macdonald was counted as part of St Albans at the 2011 census, which had a population of 305.
