= Ten Mile Hollow =

- Suburb
- Interactive map of Ten Mile Hollow
- Coordinates: 33°19′17″S 151°5′17″E
- Country: Australia
- State: New South Wales
- LGAs: Central Coast Council; City of Hawkesbury

Government
  - State electorate: Gosford, Hawkesbury
  - Federal division: Macquarie, Robertson
- Postcode: 2250, 2758

Ten Mile Hollow is a locality split between the northern outskirts of Sydney and the Central Coast region of the state of New South Wales, Australia.
