= Mellong =

Locality in New South Wales, Australia

Coordinates: 33°05′57″S 150°44′16″E

Mellong is a locality in the state of New South Wales, Australia. Mellong is located about 110 km NNW of Sydney. It is a scattered village located in the City of Hawkesbury south of Putty and north of Colo Heights.

Most of the area of the locality of Mellong is within the Wollemi National Park.
