= Out of School Care and Recreation =

Aspect of childcare

The field of Out of School Care and Recreation provides forms of childcare to children whose school days do not coincide with the working hours of their parents or guardians: before/after school and/or during school holidays. Often based in or near schools, it provides supervision and recreational/educational facilities. In Australia, these programs are commonly known as "OOSH", while in New Zealand they are commonly known as "OSCAR" .

Most programs have a community base; some operate as private profit-making ventures.

Out of School Hours Care programs are seen as vehicles for promoting healthy child development by engaging children in physical and creative activities and by linking children with other community organisations and clubs. However, the important role of these programs is the development of children's life skills, the provision of play opportunities and supporting children to engage within their community.

== OSCAR Care definition ==
OSCAR Care stands for Out of School Care and Recreation. It is often called After School Care. This definition is most commonly used in New Zealand for the sector of the childcare industry that caters for children aged 5 to 13 years of age. Predominately this type of childcare is delivered before school hours, after school hours or during school holiday breaks. OSCAR services are not delivered by government departments, but rather individuals (sole traders), companies, non-profit groups (such as churches) and school-owned operations.

== Establishment ==
Many OSCAR services are established due to community demand. Many services seek certification as an approved provider of OSCAR services from Child Youth and Family (CYF), the government department tasked with developing, maintaining and enforcing standards in the OSCAR industry. Funding for OSCAR services or programs comes from three main sources; parent cash fees paid to the provider, Work & Income subsidies (the government social welfare department) and large grants from the Ministry of Social Development (MSD).

== CYF Standards for Approved OSCAR Programs ==
CYF consulted with OSCAR service providers, and other interested stakeholders, to develop the 11 standards (or rather standard 'areas') by which an OSCAR service is approved. Suitable policies and procedures must be in place to account for: Program environment, Program operation, Health and Safety, Child Protection, Supervision, Emergencies, Staff, Buildings and Facilities, Recordkeeping, Finance, and Camps (if delivered during holidays, though this often covers 24 hours or overnight, including sleeping arrangements).

== Recreation focus ==
This sector does not provide education or curriculum delivery as OSCAR care is a recreation based service, by definition and by delivery.

The OSCAR industry has a national body, the OSCAR Foundation. By contractual agreement, the OSCAR Foundation provides monitoring of the industry by providing advisers in some regions, delivering a yearly conference and ensuring government funded programmes are being delivered by yearly visits.

With CYF approval, programmes can offer parents discounted fees and may apply for yearly assistance funding from the MSD.

== Support and quality control ==
In the two large regions of Canterbury and Auckland, local networks of OSCAR service providers have secured an agreement to receive funding directly, thus being able to employ their own OSCAR advisers. Regional networks (OSCN in Auckland and The Christchurch OSCAR Network in Canterbury) the advisers report on service delivery to the OSCAR Foundation.

The OSCAR Foundation, formally the national body went into liquidation in May 2012.
