= Macdonald River (St Albans) =

River in New South Wales, Australia

Coordinates: 32°59′55″S 150°48′04″E

Macdonald Mullen Malong Creek, Mullen Malone Creek, Branch Creek, Head of Macdonald River

Location
- Country: Australia
- State: New South Wales
- Region: Sydney Basin (IBRA), Hunter, Outer Metropolitan Sydney
- Local government areas: Singleton, Hawkesbury

Physical characteristics
- Source: Mellong Range, Great Dividing Range
  - location: northwest of Putty
  - elevation: 482 m (1,581 ft)
- Mouth: confluence with the Hawkesbury River
  - location: Butlers Crossing, Wisemans Ferry
  - elevation: 0.0963 m (3.79 in)
- Length: 150 km (93 mi)

Basin features
- River system: Hawkesbury-Nepean catchment
- Tributaries
  - left: Palomorang Creek, Howes Valley Creek, Yengo Creek, Thompson Creek, Mogo Creek, Wellums Creek
  - right: Kindarun Creek, Stony Creek (New South Wales), Reedy Creek (New South Wales), Burrowell Creek, Boggy Swamp Creek, Toorwai Creek, Marlo Creek, Melon Creek, Womerah Creek, Gorricks Creek
- National park: Yengo National Park

The Macdonald River is a perennial river located in the Hunter and Outer Metropolitan Sydney regions of New South Wales, Australia. It is a part of the Hawkesbury-Nepean catchment.

== Course and features ==
The Macdonald River rises on the eastern slopes of the Mellong Range within the Great Dividing Range below Kindarun Mountain, northwest of Putty and flows generally east by south and then south, joined by sixteen minor tributaries, before reaching its confluence with the Hawkesbury River, at Butlers Crossing, near Wisemans Ferry. The river descends 481 metres (1,578 ft) over its 150-kilometre (93 mi) course.

The upper reaches of the river flows through a remote canyon in the Yengo National Park. The lower valley of the river is also narrow but has small patches of relatively fertile land along its banks which were an important agricultural district in the early period of colonial settlement in New South Wales, due to its accessibility from Sydney by water. The historic village of St Albans is located in the lower Macdonald Valley.

== History ==
=== Aboriginal ===
Relations with the aboriginals (the Dharug and Barkinung people) were reasonably harmonious, The natives treated the newcomers as welcome guests, teaching bush skills and assisting in the planting of crops, little realizing that the whites intended to stay and claim ownership of the land. Property ownership was completely alien to the Aboriginals who cared for the land, but did not 'own' it. There are stories to suggest that on at least one occasion the local aboriginals approached the "new" land owners over concern for their own people's survival since the granted farmland given to the new settlers' substantially reduced the tribes' ability to gather food. As a result of the new settlers cultivation of land close to the river's edge, the local tribes lost the ability to collect yam and others resources. They were promised a percentage of the bounty in exchange for their labour during the harvest, however, once the crops were harvested the Aborigines were slaughtered.

=== European settlement ===
Most of the course of the river is very rugged, and away from the narrow floodplain, the soil becomes barren and sandy. The clearing that was carried out in the early 19th century was all that was usable. Thirty kilometres north of St Albans the valley becomes so narrow that there is no room for cultivable land and as families were large, farmers were forced to cultivate the flood plains down to the riverbank and even up the slopes. The first reliable record of the Macdonald valley settlers resulted from a survey by Felton Matthew in 1833–34. His map showed some 86 landholders, some with several blocks. The survey was from the mouth of the Macdonald up to the Boree Swamp that is now part of the St Albans Common. By the mid-1840s, the population reached a peak of more than 1000 people on about 100 small properties.

Early maps show original "Branch" farm grants in the Townships of Benton, Macdonald and Howick. The Village of Macdonald (now St Albans) was established at the site of a drover's camp called "Bullock Wharf". From here, cattle were shipped to the Colony by boat. (The river was navigable at that time). Halfway downstream towards Hawkesbury was to be the "Town of Benton" [Bent Town] and north of the "Village of Macdonald" the "Town of Howick". Benton and Howick were the names in 1823 as registered in the old land title records of that time. Benton finally became Central Macdonald as it is to this day.

=== Inns ===
The Settlers Inn in St Albans still survives as a working inn. A number of other Inns in the valley have been restored as private residences. The oldest licensed Inn in the valley was The Industrious Settler, built by Aaron Walters in 1833 and located approximately 3 kilometres (1.9 mi) north of St Albans, and another early inn was The Victoria Inn, erected by David Cross in 1842, about 5 kilometres (3.1 mi) from the Hawkesbury River junction with the Macdonald.

=== Churches and cemeteries ===
The valley once supporting seven small churches and four denominational schools, many now in ruins. Throughout the valley are the remains of a number of small cemeteries. Some of the earlier settlers, especially in the upper valley, buried their dead on their properties.

=== St Albans Common ===
Since 1824 an area north of St Albans of approximately 10.4 square kilometres (4.0 sq mi) along the Mogo Creek has been in use as common land. This has its roots in the traditional "Common" of England and is designed to compensate "villagers" for the small size of their allotments. Perpetual succession to the St Albans Common was granted on 4 March 1853 to five trustees, who were to act on behalf of the "Settlers, Cultivators and other Inhabitants of the District". The land is private property, reserved for the use of the "Commoners" and is still run by the Commoners themselves through the Trustees. As well as being host to stock the Common has an extensive lagoon which provides a refuge to many water birds and wildlife. The whole area is now listed as a conservation area ensuring its preservation for future generations of St Albans Commoners.

== See also ==
- List of rivers of Australia
- List of rivers of New South Wales (L–Z)
- Rivers of New South Wales
