= St Albans, New South Wales =

Suburb of New South Wales, Australia

St Albans
- Suburb
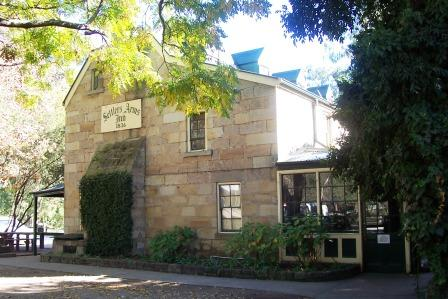
- Settlers Arms Inn

- Coordinates: 33°17′25″S 150°58′34″E
- Country: Australia
- State: New South Wales
- LGA: City of Hawkesbury
- Location: 94 km (58 mi) NW of Sydney CBD

Government
  - State electorate: Hawkesbury
  - Federal division: Macquarie
- Elevation: 13 m (43 ft)

Population
  - Total: 161 (2021 census)
- Postcode: 2775
Suburbs around St Albans
Colo Heights	Laguna	Laguna
Colo Heights	St Albans	Kulnura
Colo Heights	Lower Macdonald	Kulnura

St Albans is a small and historic village on the Macdonald River, New South Wales, Australia, about 94 kilometres (65 mi) north west of Sydney. At the 2021 census, St Albans and the surrounding area had a population of 161.

== History ==
The original inhabitants of the Hawkesbury district were the Darug tribe of Aboriginals, also spelt as Dharug or Daruk. The river, which they called Derrubbin, was a focal point as a source of food and transport. The Darug people used the river to farm for fish, eels, water birds, and mussels. They also used the river as a mode of transport in bark canoes.

It was first settled by Europeans in 1794 in a bid to acquire arable land to feed the increasing population of the penal colony at Sydney. In April 1794, Lieutenant Governor Francis Grose submitted plans for the first 22 farms on the Hawkesbury River in the present Pitt Town Bottoms area. In June 1795 a camp of Aboriginal peoples opposing the landtakings was harassed by a British regiment commanded by Paterson (who later regretted the necessary injustice).

The "Village of Macdonald" was surveyed in 1837 but renamed St Albans on 26 January 1841 after the City of St Albans in Hertfordshire, England, north of London.

In the early part of the colonial settlement of New South Wales, the Macdonald Valley was an important agricultural area because of its accessibility by water. However, with the development of railways and extensive agricultural development west of the Great Dividing Range, the Macdonald Valley less important and declined into a remote backwater. The valley is often referred to by the locals as the "Forgotten Valley".

St Albans is on the banks of the Macdonald River, a tributary of the Hawkesbury River which is about 15 kilometres (9.5 mi) to the south. The village was opened for settlement in 1842 largely because it had become an important stopping point for farmers and others in the area wanting to ship their goods down the Hawkesbury River to Sydney. St Albans was at the navigational upper limit of the Macdonald River. This upper portion of the river has since been drastically reduced to navigation with sand and silt.

== Ferry and road access ==
Two (free) 24-hour car ferries provide access to St Albans from the Sydney region along roads following the old goat and horse tracks on either side of the Macdonald. Both roads meander (one partly unsealed) through rich country and farms of cattle, melons, orchards and corn. On either side of the river are historic homes and spectacular sandstone towering hills. A route is through Wisemans Ferry township and north across the Hawkesbury via Wisemans ferry, then follows the eastern side of the Macdonald. The first bridge to cross the river links the two roads at St Albans. Another route to St Albans is to turn left just before entering Wisemans Ferry township, cross the Hawkesbury via the Webbs Creek Ferry, then follow up the western side of the Macdonald to the village.

== Churches and cemetery ==
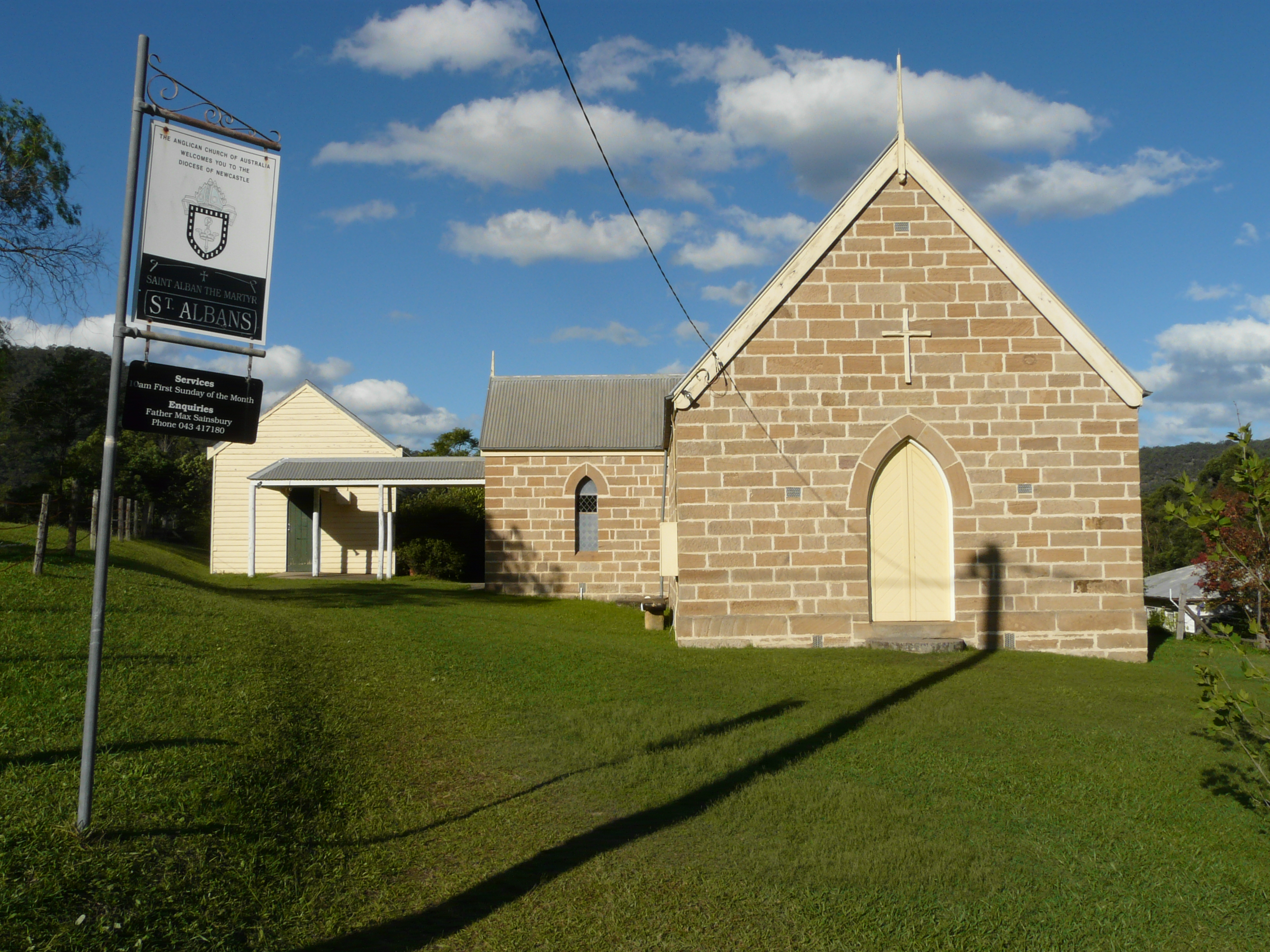
St Albans Anglican Church

The St Albans Anglican Church (Saint Alban The Martyr), near the top of Wharf Road is the only church still in use. A timber chapel, opened in 1843, was replaced by the current stone building in 1897.

Another interesting stone church remaining in the village is the old Wesleyan Methodist church in Espie Street. This was built in 1902 and is now in private hands, a reminder of almost 150 years of Wesleyan influence in the Macdonald valley.

The stone Catholic church of St Joseph, completed about 1845, has been restored and converted into a guesthouse.

The funerals of those close to town usually progressed by boat to the old St Albans Burial Ground, a few kilometres south of the village beside the river, founded in 1826. This site had in the past suffered much by neglect, floods and vandalism but is now preserved.

== Historic buildings ==
Two sites in St Albans are listed on the New South Wales Heritage Register:

- 181 Main Road: MacDonald River bridge
- 37 Upper Macdonald Road: Price Morris Cottage

Other historic sites include:

- The Court House and Police lockup built in 1890

The Court House is perched on wooded slopes of Hawkesbury sandstone, high above the beautiful Macdonald River and St Albans. The building, originally consisting of a courtroom, police station and lock-up, now offers comfortable overnight and holiday accommodation. The original prisoners' exercise yard is now a recreational area. The two original cells have been retained as unique bathrooms. The building is recognised by the National Trust and has a City of Hawkesbury heritage classification.

- The Settlers Arms Inn (Originally known as Travellers Rest)

The inn occupies a picturesque position facing the river and is in an excellent state of preservation. In July 1842 the first land sales were held in St Albans. John Sullivan of Wollombi purchased seven allotments on which he built the Settlers Arms Inn. It was constructed at a cattle drover's camp on the limit of navigation on the Macdonald River. It still trades as "a purveyor of conversation, beer, and accommodation". There is some confusion as to the construction date. 1836 was the year the license was issued, number. 36/10, but a report by the Hawkesbury correspondent in the ‘’Sydney Morning Herald’’ on 1 March 1848 reads: "The township which a few years ago was marked out upon this river, has been built on by only one individual, Mr. Sullivan. He has erected a very reasonable stone house two stories high, which we understand he intends to open as an Inn." [Implying that it was not open then.].

- Price Morris Cottage 1837

The newly restored 1837 cottage took 8 years to build and 2 years to restore. It has vertical timber slab, wattle and daub construction with its calico ceilings under a shingle roof. Price Morris, an emancipist/farmer took up the 50 acre (20 hectare) property grant in 1837. In the 1830s the area was settled by Welsh Methodists and the Price Morris cottage became the centre for Methodist meetings and worship. A Methodist church was built in St. Albans but the cottage continued as an occasional meeting place until the late 1960s. One of the preachers was the grandfather of the late Sir Alan Walker, founder of the Central Methodist Mission.

== Floods ==
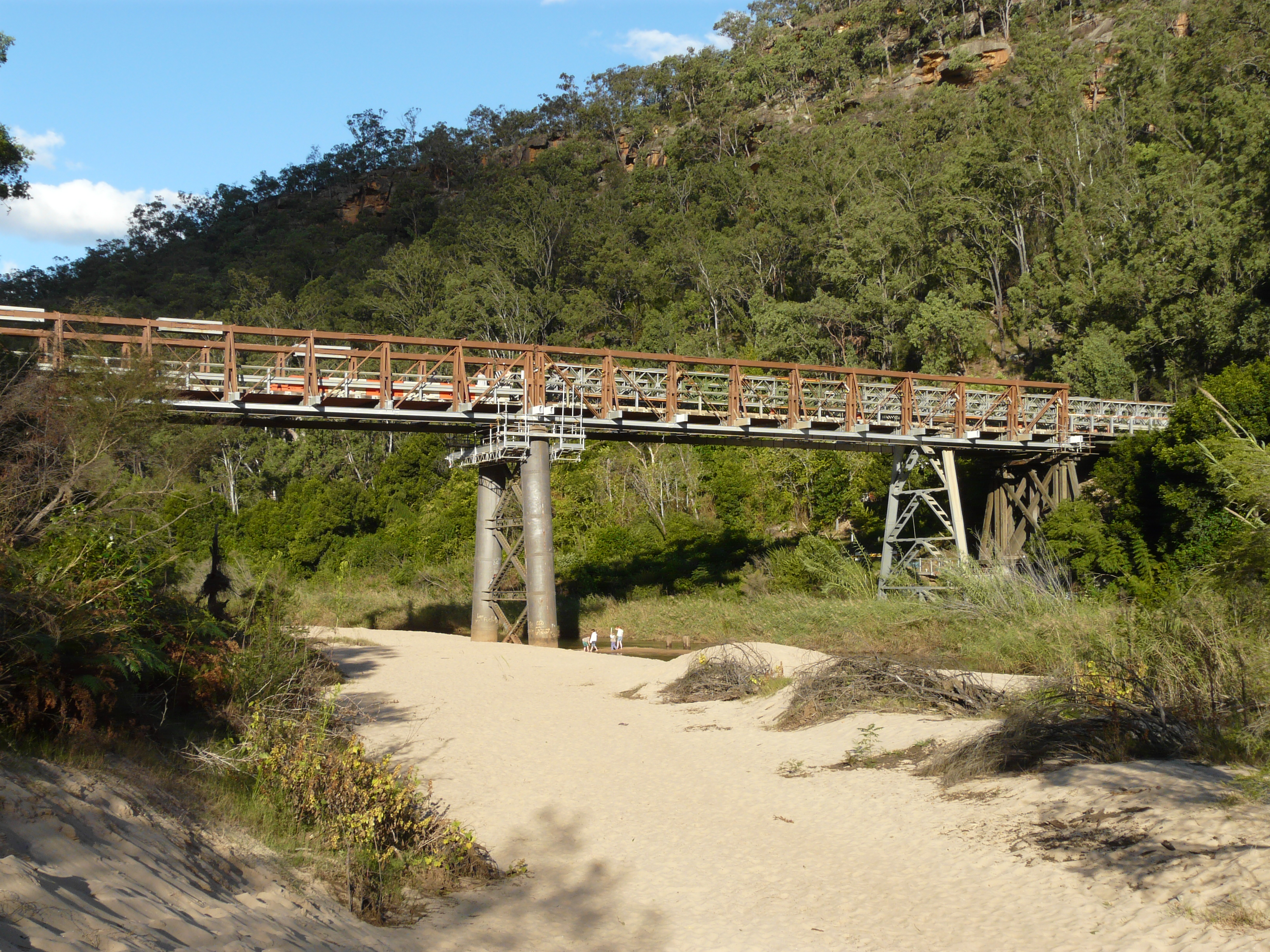
Road bridge at St Albans

There were devastating floods in 1867, 1889, 1913, and particularly 1949. The town lies fifty feet above the riverbed and the floor of the bridge is forty feet from the sand. In the 1889 flood the bridge was covered, the Court House was not washed away but the Police quarters were. The water rose to the eaves of Jurds Hotel (Settlers Arms Inn) and left a hole seven feet deep in front of it. The old house was of stone, but some of it washed away. The floodwaters rose to the veranda eaves and washed away five houses, and another newly built on the other side of the river.

== Bibliography ==
- Aussie Towns. ‘St. Albans, N.S.W.’ https://www.aussietowns.com.au/town/st-albans-nsw
- Discover the Hawkesbury. ‘St. Albans’. https://www.discoverthehawkesbury.com.au/hawkesbury-towns/st-albans
- Hawkesbury People & Places. ‘Settler’s Arms Hotel.’ https://www.hawkesbury.org/name/settlers-arms-inn.html
- Neve, M. Hutton. The forgotten valley: history of the Macdonald Valley and St. Albans, N.S.W. Library of Australian History, 1978.
- Visit Sydney Australia. ‘St. Albans’. https://www.visitsydneyaustralia.com.au/st-albans.html
