= City of Hawkesbury =

- Local government area
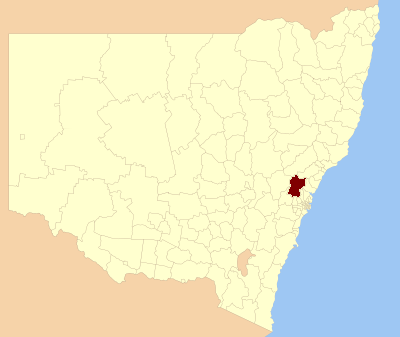
- Location in Outer Metropolitan Sydney

- Interactive map of City of Hawkesbury
- Coordinates: 33°36′41.42″S 150°48′53.68″E
- Country: Australia
- State: New South Wales
- Region: Hawkesbury; Blue Mountains; Greater Western Sydney
- Established: 1 January 1981
- Council seat: Windsor

Government
  - Mayor: Mary Lyons-Buckett (Independent)
  - State electorates: Hawkesbury; Londonderry; Riverstone; Upper Hunter
  - Federal divisions: Macquarie; Greenway; Hunter

Area
  - Total: 2,776 km^{2} (1,072 sq mi)

Population
  - Total: 67,207 (LGA 2021)
- Website: City of Hawkesbury
LGAs around City of Hawkesbury
Mid-Western	Singleton	Central Coast & Cessnock
Lithgow	City of Hawkesbury	The Hills
Blue Mountains	Penrith	Blacktown

The City of Hawkesbury is a local government area that is located on the far northwest fringe of the Greater Sydney area in New South Wales, Australia. The local government area is located in the Hawkesbury and Blue Mountains regions. Hawkesbury City is named after the Hawkesbury River. Major towns in the City of Hawkesbury are Windsor and Richmond. It is a member council of the Hawkesbury River County Council.

The mayor of the city of Hawkesbury since September 2026 is Mary Lyons-Bucket. She previously served as mayor from 2016 to 2018.

== Suburbs and localities in the local government area ==
Suburbs and localities in the City of Hawkesbury are:

- Agnes Banks (shared with City of Penrith)
- Berambing
- Bilpin
- Blaxlands Ridge
- Bligh Park
- Bowen Mountain
- Bucketty (shared with Cessnock City Council)
- Cattai (shared with The Hills Shire)
- Central Colo
- Central Macdonald
- Clarendon
- Colo
- Colo Heights
- Cornwallis
- Cumberland Reach
- East Kurrajong
- Ebenezer
- Fernances
- Freemans Reach
- Glossodia
- Grose Vale
- Grose Wold
- Higher Macdonald
- Hobartville
- Kurmond
- Kurrajong
- Kurrajong Heights
- Kurrajong Hills
- Leets Vale (shared with The Hills Shire)
- Lower Macdonald
- Lower Portland (shared with The Hills Shire)
- Maraylya (shared with The Hills Shire)
- McGraths Hill
- Mellong
- Mogo Creek
- Mountain Lagoon
- Mulgrave
- North Richmond
- Oakville
- Perrys Crossing
- Pitt Town
- Pitt Town Bottoms
- Putty
- Richmond
- Richmond Lowlands
- Sackville
- Scheyville
- South Windsor
- St Albans
- Ten Mile Hollow (shared with Central Coast Council)
- Tennyson
- The Devils Wilderness
- The Lowlands
- The Slopes
- Upper Colo
- Upper Macdonald
- Vineyard (shared with City of Blacktown)
- Webbs Creek
- Wheeny Creek
- Wilberforce
- Windsor
- Windsor Downs
- Wisemans Ferry (shared with Central Coast Council, The Hills Shire and Hornsby Shire)
- Womerah
- Wrights Creek
- Yarramundi

== History ==
The original inhabitants of the Hawkesbury district were the Darug tribe of Aboriginals, also spelt as Dharug or Daruk. The river, which they called Derrubbin, was a focal point as a source of food and transport. The Darug people used the river to farm for fish, eels, water birds, and mussels. They also used the river as a mode of transport in bark canoes.

It was first settled by Europeans in 1794 in a bid to acquire arable land to feed the increasing population of the penal colony at Sydney. In April 1794, Lieutenant Governor Francis Grose submitted plans for the first 22 farms on the Hawkesbury River in the present Pitt Town Bottoms area. In June 1795, Lieutenant Governor William Paterson deployed troops to engage with Aboriginals inhabiting land along the Hawkesbury River.

By 1811 Governor Lachlan Macquarie established the five Macquarie Towns in the area. They are Windsor, Richmond, Castlereagh, Wilberforce and Pitt Town, all located on and around the Hawkesbury River. Many of the early 19th century buildings still survive today. Ebenezer has the oldest surviving church and school building in Australia. Windsor District Council was formed in 1843 and disbanded in 1846. In 1871 the Borough Council of Windsor was founded and the Richmond Borough Council followed in 1872. The two councils amalgamated in 1949 to become the Municipality of Windsor. Colo Shire Council was established in 1906 and joined Windsor Municipal Council from 1 January 1981 to become Hawkesbury Shire Council. On 1 July 1989, Hawkesbury became a City.

On its creation in 1981, Hawkesbury was largely rural, but urban expansion within Sydney has since transformed the southern part of the area into dormitory suburbs. The northern part of the local government area still contains some farmlands and national parkland.

== Demographics ==
At the 2021 census, there were 67,207 people in the Hawkesbury local government area. Of these, 49.8% were male and 50.2% were female. Aboriginal and Torres Strait Islander people made up 4.8% of the population, which was 1.6% above the national average. The median age of people in the City of Hawkesbury was 39 years. Children aged 0–14 years made up 19.1% of the population and people aged 65 years and over made up 16.6% of the population. Of people in the area aged 15 years and over, 49.3% were married and 12.4% were either divorced or separated.

Population in the City of Hawkesbury between the 2001 Census and the 2006 Census decreased by 0.54%; and in the subsequent five years to the 2011 Census, population growth was 2.96%. Between the 2011 and 2016 Census, population increased by a further 1.04%. When compared with total population growth of Australia for the same periods, population growth in Hawkesbury local government area was significantly lower than the national average. The median weekly income for residents within the City of Hawkesbury has been consistently marginally higher than the national average.

At the 2021 Census, the proportion of residents in the Hawkesbury local government area who stated their ancestry as Australian or English amounted to 80.8%, representing an increase from 62% in 2011. Many people from the Hawkesbury identified as having a Catholic (26.0%) or Anglican (19.3%) religious affiliation in 2021.

Selected historical census data for Hawkesbury local government area
Census year		2001	2006	2011	2016	2021
Population	Estimated residents on census night	60,887	▼60,561	▲62,353	▲64,592	▲67,207
Population	LGA rank in terms of size within New South Wales		34th	align="right"	align="right"|	
Population	% of New South Wales population			0.90%	▲1.66%	▼0.83%
Population	% of Australian population	0.32%	▼0.31%	▼0.29%	▼0.27%	▼0.26%
Cultural and language diversity						
Ancestry, top responses	Australian			32.6%	▼30.4%	▲41.1%
Ancestry, top responses	English			29.5%	29.5%	▲39.7%
Ancestry, top responses	Irish			7.6%	▲8.3%	▲10.6%
Ancestry, top responses	Scottish			6.3%	▲6.8%	▲9.5%
Ancestry, top responses	Maltese			3.1%	▲3.5%	▲5.8%
Language, top responses (other than English)	Maltese	0.8%	▼0.7%	▲0.8%	▲0.9%	0.9%
Language, top responses (other than English)	Italian	0.6%	0.6%	▼0.5%	▼0.4%	▼0.4%
Language, top responses (other than English)	Cantonese	–	–	–	0.3%	0.3%
Language, top responses (other than English)	German	0.3%	0.3%	0.3%	0.3%	–
Language, top responses (other than English)	Arabic	0.3%	0.3%	0.3%	0.3%	▲0.4%
Language, top responses (other than English)	Punjabi	–	–	–	–	0.5%
Religious affiliation						
Religious affiliation, top responses	Catholic	26.6%	▲27.3%	▲28.2%	▼27.5%	▼26.0%
Religious affiliation, top responses	Anglican	30.9%	▼29.9%	▼29.4%	▼24.6%	▼19.3%
Religious affiliation, top responses	No religion	12.2%	▲14.8%	▲16.7%	▲23.9%	▲33.7%
Religious affiliation, top responses	Not stated	–	–	–	8.3%	▼5.5%
Religious affiliation, top responses	Uniting Church	5.7%	▼5.0%	▼4.4%	▼3.3%	▼2.6%
Religious affiliation, top responses	Presbyterian and Reformed	3.0%	▲5.7%	▼2.8%	–	–
Median weekly incomes						
Personal income	Median weekly personal income	–	$527	▲$622	▲$728	▲$860
Personal income	% of Australian median income	–	113.1%	▼107.8%	▲110.0%	▼106.8%
Family income	Median weekly family income	–	$1,146	▲$1,598	▲$1,916	▲$2,272
Family income	% of Australian median income	–	111.6%	▼107.9%	▲110.5%	▼107.1%
Household income	Median weekly household income	–	$1,290	▲$1,385	▲$1,668	▲$1,980
Household income	% of Australian median income	–	110.2%	▲112.2%	▲116.0%	▼113.4%

== Council ==
=== Current composition and election method ===
Hawkesbury City Council is composed of twelve councillors elected proportionally as one entire ward. All councillors are elected for a fixed four-year term of office. The mayor is elected by the councillors at the first meeting of the council. The most recent election was held on 14 September 2024, and the makeup of the council is as follows:

Party	Councillors
Liberal Party	4
Independents and Unaligned	4
Labor Party	1
Shooters, Fishers and Farmers Party	1
The Greens	1
The Small Business Party	1
Total	12

The current Council, elected in 2024, is:

Councillor	Party	Notes
Nathan Zamprogno	Independent	
Sarah McMahon	Liberal	Deputy Mayor 2024–date
Mary Lyons-Buckett	Independent	
Mike Creed	Liberal	
Tom Aczel	Independent	
Paul Veigel	Liberal	
Jill Reardon	Liberal	
Danielle Wheeler	Greens	
Les Sheather	Independent	Mayor 2024–2026
Eddie Dogramaci	The Small Business Party	Suspended since August 2025 pending resolution of a legal matter.
Amanda Kotlash	Labor	
Shane Djuric	Shooters, Fishers and Farmers Party	

== Election results ==
=== 2024 ===
2024 Hawkesbury City Council election: Results summary
Party	Votes	%	Swing	Seats	Change
Liberal	10,997	27.3	−7.1	4	Steady
Independents	7,417	18.4		2	Steady
People Not Parties	4,879	12.1	+2.4	2	▲1
Shooters, Fishers, Farmers	4,529	11.2	+4.1	1	Steady
Labor	4,337	10.7	−1.4	1	▼1
Greens	3,930	9.7	+2.6	1	Steady
Small Business	3,474	8.6	+4.0	1	Steady
Hawkesbury's Future	785	2.0	+2.0	0	Steady
Formal votes	40,348	93.5			
Informal votes	2,808	6.5			
Total	43,156	100.0		12	
Registered voters / turnout	50,010	86.3			

=== 2021 ===
Elected councillor	Party
Sarah McMahon	Liberal
Patrick Conolly	Liberal
Paul Veigel	Liberal
Jill Reardon	Liberal
Barry Calvert	Labor
Amanda Kotlash	Labor
Mary Lyons-Buckett	People Not Parties
Nathan Zamprogno	Ind. Liberal
Les Sheather	Les and The Doc
Shane Djuric	SFF
Danielle Wheeler	Greens
Eddie Dogramaci	Small Business

2021 New South Wales local elections: Hawkesbury
Party	Candidate	Votes	%	±%
Liberal		13,577	34.3	+6.0
Labor		4,783	12.1	−4.3
People Not Parties		3,846	9.7	
Independent Liberal		3,357	8.5	
Les and The Doc		2,916	7.4	
Shooters, Fishers, Farmers		2,821	7.1	+7.1
Greens		2,795	7.1	−0.8
Small Business		1,899	4.8	+4.8
Andrew Cadman Group		1,070	2.7	
Independent		947	2.4	
Hawkesbury Alliance		944	2.4	
The Locals		448	1.1	
Independent	John Ross	85	0.2	
Total formal votes		39,488	94.9	
Informal votes		2,135	5.1	
Turnout		41,623	86.1	

== Mayors ==
Mayor	Party	Term	Notes
Cecil Sullivan	Independent	1980-1981	
Bruce Brown	Independent	1981-1983	
Geoffrey Michael	Independent	1983-1987	
John Horrex	Independent	1987- 1989 (Shire president)	
John Horrex	Independent	1989-1990 (Mayor, after Hawkesbury gazetted a city)	
Wendy Sledge	Independent	1990-1994	
Rex Stubbs	Independent	27 September 1994 – 30 September 1997	
Rex Stubbs	Independent	30 September 1997 – 29 September 1999	
Rex Stubbs	Independent	29 September 1999 – 27 September 2004	
Bart Bassett	Liberal	27 September 2004 – 18 September 2006	
Rex Stubbs	Independent	18 September 2006 – 18 September 2007	
Bart Bassett	Liberal	18 September 2007 – 20 September 2011	
Kim Ford	Liberal	20 September 2011 – 10 September 2016	
Mary Lyons-Buckett	Independent	27 September 2016 – 18 September 2018	
Barry Calvert	Labor	18 September 2018 – 22 September 2020	
Patrick Conolly	Liberal	22 September 2020 – 23 August 2022	
Sarah McMahon	Liberal	23 August 2022 – 15 October 2024	
Les Sheather	Independent	15 October 2024 – 8 September 2026	
Mary Lyons-Buckett	Independent	8 September 2026 -	

== See also ==
- Local government in New South Wales
