= Putty Road =

Road in New South Wales, Australia

Putty Road New South Wales
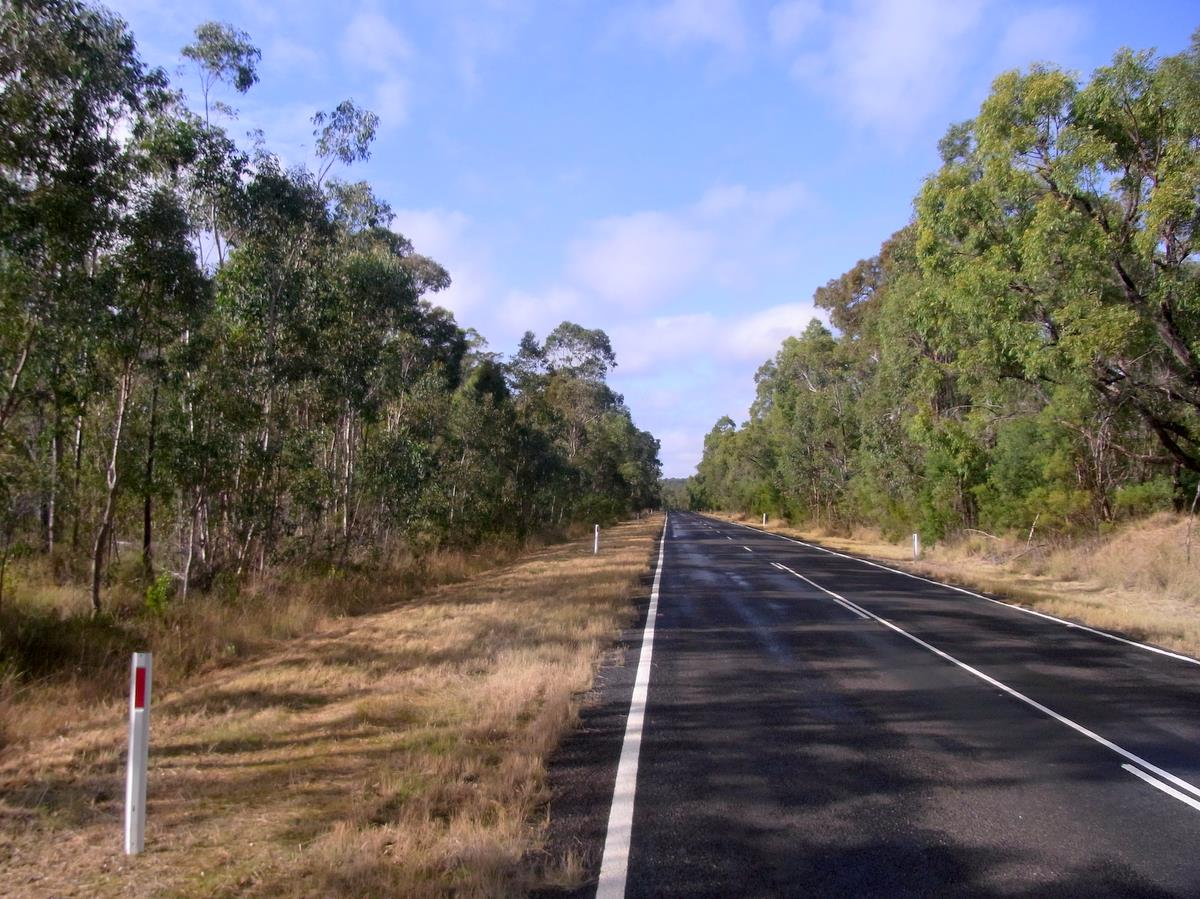
- Putty Road near Wombat Swamp, Mellong
- Coordinates: 32.559003°S 151.173500°E (North end); 33.562086°S 150.838726°E (South end)

General information
- Type: Road
- Length: 168 km (104 mi)
- Opened: 1823
- Gazetted: August 1939
- Route number(s): Concurrency: B84 (2013–present) (through Mount Thorley)
- Former route number: State Route 69 (1974–2013); Entire route

Major junctions
- North end: New England Highway; Singleton, New South Wales
- Golden Highway
- South end: Wilberforce Road; Wilberforce, New South Wales

Location(s)
- Major suburbs: Mount Thorley, Milbrodale, Putty, Colo Heights, Colo

(The) Putty Road is a 168-kilometre (104 mi)-long rural road that links the Hunter Region in New South Wales to Wilberforce, just north of Windsor on the far northwestern suburban edge of Sydney, Australia.

== Route ==
Putty Road commences as John Street in Singleton, running in a southerly direction as a two-lane, single carriageway road, crossing the Main Northern railway line as Putty Road and continuing south until the intersection with Mitchells Line of Road (part of Golden Highway); Putty Road and Golden Highway are concurrent for around 2 kilometres through the Mount Thorley industrial estate, before Putty Road branches south-east to run through Bulga, Milbrodale, Putty and Colo, bounded to the west and east by protected national parks – the Wollemi National Park to the west, and the Yengo National Park to the east – both part of the UNESCO World Heritage-listed Greater Blue Mountains Area. Putty Road eventually terminates at the intersection of King Road and Wilberforce Road in Wilberforce, 6km north of Windsor.

Putty Road is very historic, closely following the Bulga Road (named after the Bulga Creek), first explored by John Howe, Chief Constable of Windsor, being the first road to link Sydney to the Hunter Valley. It was opened in 1823 and was initially a popular cattle-duffing (an Australian term for cattle-rustling) route. The road is narrow and winding in places and very scenic, but may be hazardous during wet weather. It is popular with tourists, motorcyclists and cyclists.

== History ==
The passing of the Main Roads Act of 1924 through the Parliament of New South Wales provided for the declaration of Main Roads, roads partially funded by the State government through the Main Roads Board (MRB, later Transport for NSW). With the subsequent passing of the Main Roads (Amendment) Act of 1929 to provide for additional declarations of State Highways and Trunk Roads, the Department of Main Roads (having succeeded the MRB in 1932) declared Main Road 503 from Lower Kurrajong via Upper Colo, Putty and Bulga to Singleton on 23 August 1939; the southern end was re-aligned to run via Colo to terminate at Wilberforce on 17 January 1945; its former alignment to Lower Kurrajong was redeclared as Main Road 519. Its northern end was truncated to the intersection with Golden Highway at Mount Thorley on 22 November 1996; the western end of Main Road 128 was extended to cover its former alignment from Mount Thorley into Singleton (and continuing eastwards to East Gresford).

The passing of the Roads Act of 1993 updated road classifications and the way they could be declared within New South Wales. Under this act, Putty Road retains its declaration as Main Road 503 and part of Main Road 128.

Putty Road was allocated part of State Route 69 in 1974. With the conversion to the newer alphanumeric system in 2013, it was removed and the route is now unallocated, apart from the short concurrency with route B84 along Golden Highway through Mount Thorley.

== Major intersections ==
LGA	Location	km	mi	Destinations	Notes
Singleton	Singleton	0.0	0.0	Queen Street, to Gresford Road – East Gresford	Northern terminus of road
Singleton	Singleton	0.0	0.0	New England Highway (A15) – Muswellbrook, Tamworth, Branxton, Newcastle	Eastbound exit from New England Highway only
Singleton	Singleton	0.2	0.12	Newton Street (west) – Darlington; Campbell Street (east) – Singleton to New England Highway (A15) – Muswellbrook, Tamworth, Branxton, Newcastle	Roundabout
Singleton	Singleton	1.6	0.99	Main Northern railway line	
Singleton	Mount Thorley	8.8	5.5	Mitchell Line of Road (Golden Highway) (B84 east) – Branxton	Eastern concurrency terminus with Golden Highway; Route B84 continues east along Mitchell Line of Road
Singleton	Mount Thorley	9.7	6.0	Broke Road – Broke	
Singleton	Mount Thorley	12.1	7.5	Jerrys Plains Road (Golden Highway) (B84 north) – Warkworth; Mount Thorley Road (south) – Mount Thorley	Western concurrency terminus with Golden Highway; Route B84 continues north along Jersey Plains Road
Wollombi Brook		21.5	13.4	Wollombi Brook Bridge	
Singleton	Milbrodale	27.4	17.0	Milbrodale Road – Broke	
Macdonald River		62.6	38.9	Bridge over river (name not known)	
Singleton	Putty	82.5	51.3	Putty Valley Road – Putty	
Colo River		150.5	93.5	Bridge over river (name not known)	
Hawkesbury	Colo	150.7	93.6	Upper Colo Road (west) – Central Colo, Upper Colo; Lower Colo Road (east) – Lower Portland	
Hawkesbury	East Kurrajong	159.3	99.0	Bull Ridge Road – Sackville	
Hawkesbury	East Kurrajong	160.4	99.7	East Kurrajong Road – Kurrajong	
Hawkesbury	Wilberforce	168.4	104.6	King Road (east), to Sackville Road – Sackville; King Street (west) – Wilberforce	
Hawkesbury	Wilberforce	168.4	104.6	Wilberforce Road – Windsor	Southern terminus of road
1.000 mi = 1.609 km; 1.000 km = 0.621 mi: Concurrency terminus; Incomplete access; Route transition

== See also ==
- Highways in Australia
- List of highways in New South Wales
