= Wheeny Creek =

- Suburb
- Coordinates: 33°27′S 150°40′E
- Country: Australia
- State: New South Wales
- City: Sydney
- LGA: City of Hawkesbury
- Location: 81 km (50 mi) NW of Sydney CBD

Government
  - State electorate: Hawkesbury
  - Federal division: Macquarie
- Elevation: 8 m (26 ft)
- Postcode: 2758
Suburbs around Wheeny Creek
Upper Colo	Central Colo	Colo
Blaxlands Ridge	Wheeny Creek	Sackville
Blaxlands Ridge	Glossodia	Ebenezer

Wheeny Creek is a locality of Sydney, in the state of New South Wales, Australia. It is located in the City of Hawkesbury north-east of Kurrajong.

At the 2011 census, the population of Wheeny Creek was counted as part of Mountain Lagoon, which had 327 people.
