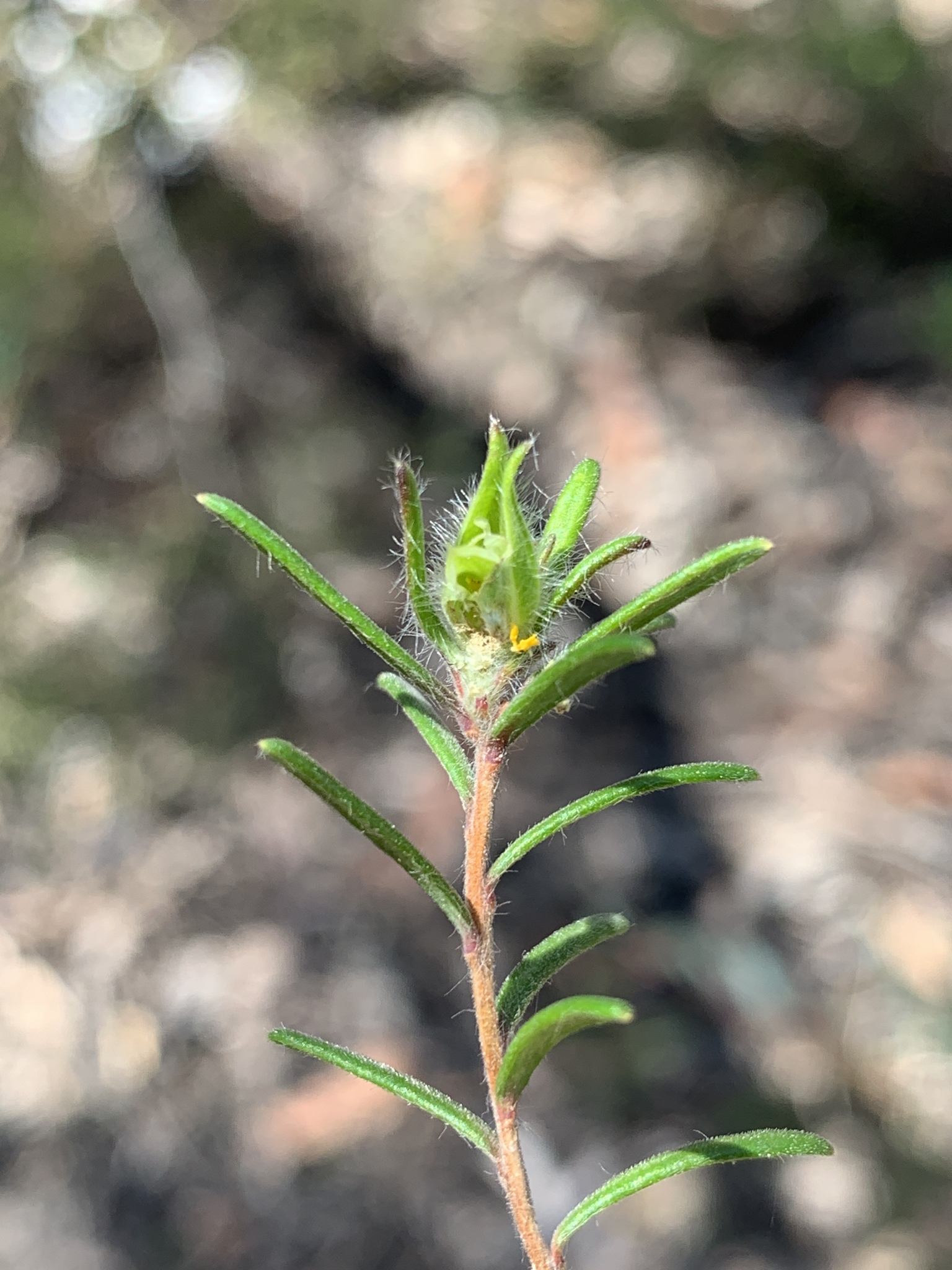
- Near Warrimoo

Scientific classification
- Kingdom: Plantae
- Clade: Tracheophytes
- Clade: Angiosperms
- Clade: Eudicots
- Order: Dilleniales
- Family: Dilleniaceae
- Genus: Hibbertia
- Species: H. superans

Binomial name
- Hibbertia superans Toelken

= Hibbertia superans =

Species of flowering plant

Hibbertia superans is a species of flowering plant in the family Dilleniaceae and is endemic to New South Wales, Australia. It is a low, spreading shrub with silky-hairy foliage, linear leaves and yellow flowers with six to nine stamens on one side of two carpels.

== Description ==
Hibbertia superans is spreading shrub that typically grows to a height of up to 30 cm (12 in) and has silky-hairy foliage. The leaves are linear, mostly 7.5–10 mm (0.30–0.39 in) long, 0.9–1.2 mm (0.035–0.047 in) wide on a short petiole, and with the edges rolled under. The flowers are arranged singly on the ends of branches and are more or less sessile with linear bracts 8.3–9.5 mm (0.33–0.37 in) long and 1.0–1.3 mm (0.039–0.051 in) wide at the base. The five sepal are joined at the base, the outer lobes 7.5–9.0 mm (0.30–0.35 in) long and 1.5–1.6 mm (0.059–0.063 in) wide, the inner lobes shorter but broader. The petals are yellow, broadly egg-shaped with the narrower end towards the base, 5.5–6.7 mm (0.22–0.26 in) long with six to nine stamens fused at the base on one side of two carpels, each carpel with four ovules. Flowering occurs from July to September.

== Taxonomy ==
Hibbertia superans was first formally described in 2000 by Hellmut R. Toelken in the Journal of the Adelaide Botanic Gardens from specimens collected near Kellyville in 1998. The specific epithet (superans) means "overtopping", referring to flowers found on old flowering branches.

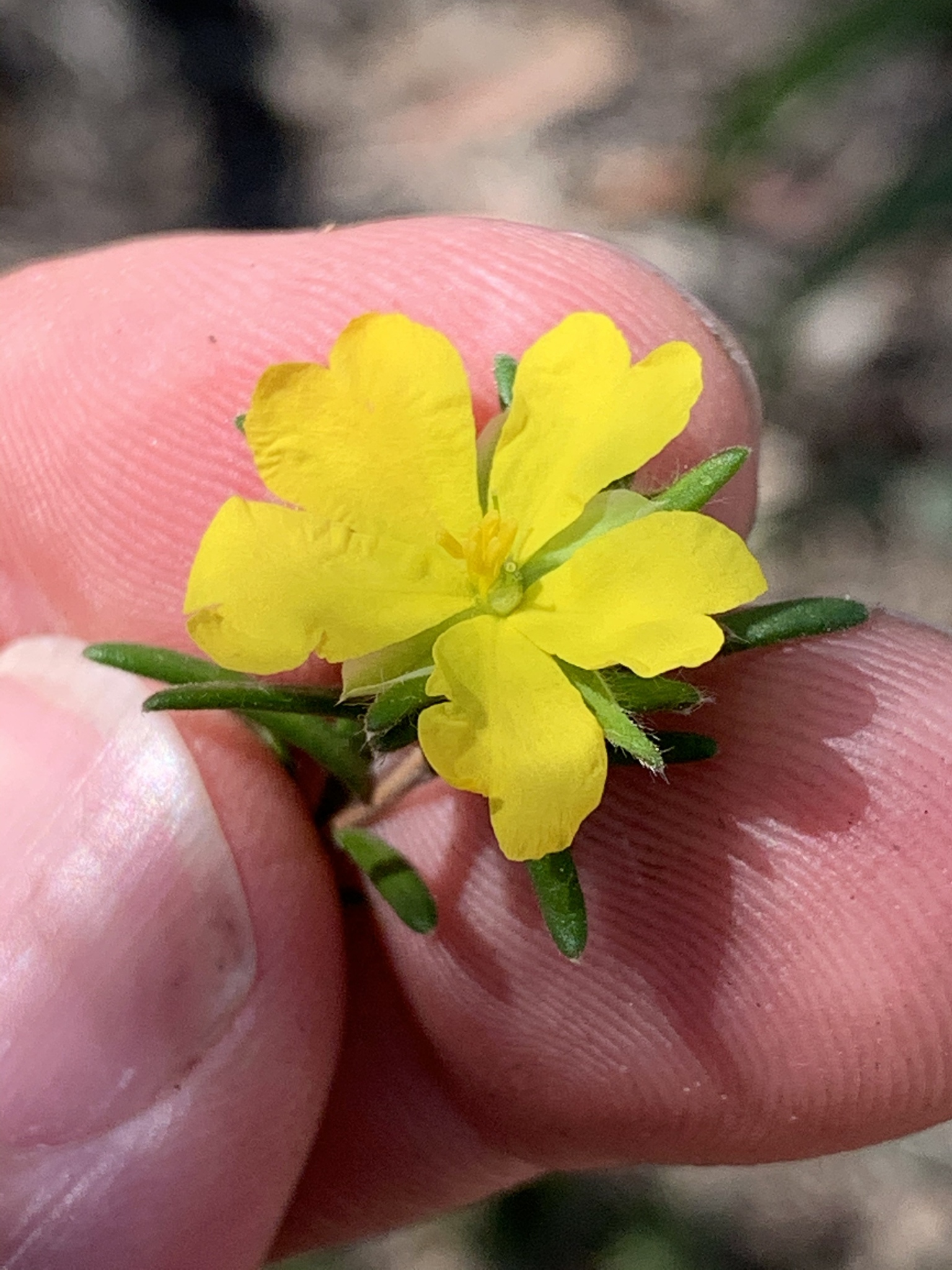
Flower

== Distribution and habitat ==
This hibbertia grows on sandstone ridge-tops in woodland and heathland mainly between Baulkham Hills and South Maroota in the northern outskirts of Sydney.

== Conservation status ==
Hibbertia superans is listed as "endangered" under the New South Wales Government Biodiversity Conservation Act 2016. The main threats to the species include land clearing, habitat disturbance, weed invasion and road and rail maintenance.

== See also ==
- List of Hibbertia species
