= Colo, New South Wales =

Colo Sydney, New South Wales
- Coordinates: 33°25′S 150°48′E
- Population: 62 (SAL 2021)
- Postcode(s): 2756
- Elevation: 15 m (49 ft)
- Location: 85 km (53 mi) NW of Sydney CBD
- LGA(s): City of Hawkesbury
- State electorate(s): Hawkesbury
- Federal division(s): Macquarie
Suburbs around Colo:
Central Colo	Yengo National Park	Yengo National Park
Central Colo	Colo	Lower Portland
Wheeny Creek	Wheeny Creek	Sackville

Colo is a small town located north-west of Sydney in New South Wales, Australia. It is home to the Colo River and parts of the Wollemi National Park. The main road through Colo is Putty Road. The locality of Colo is bounded in the south and the east by the Hawkesbury River.

Colo was counted as part of Mountain Lagoon at the 2016 census, which had a population of 327.
