= Upper Colo =

Upper Colo Sydney, New South Wales
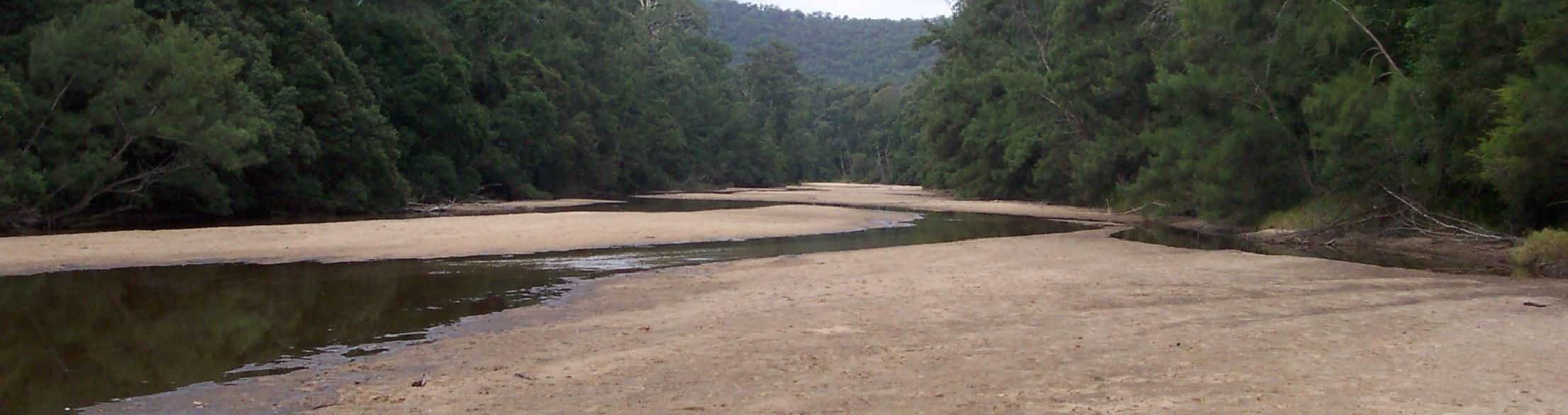
- Upper Colo River

- Coordinates: 33°25′S 150°44′E
- Population: 48 (SAL 2021)
- Postcode(s): 2756
- Elevation: 18 m (59 ft)
- Location: 93 km (58 mi) NW of Sydney CBD
- LGA(s): City of Hawkesbury
- State electorate(s): Hawkesbury
- Federal division(s): Macquarie
Suburbs around Upper Colo:
| Blue Mountains National Park | Colo Heights | Colo Heights |
| Mountain Lagoon | Upper Colo | Central Colo |
| Mountain Lagoon | Blaxlands Ridge | Wheeny Creek |

Upper Colo is a locality of Sydney, in the state of New South Wales, Australia. It is located in the City of Hawkesbury west of Colo and south of Colo Heights, on the Colo River, a tributary of the Hawkesbury River. It was previously known as Colo Upper.

Upper Colo was counted as part of Mountain Lagoon at the 2011 census, which had a population of 327.

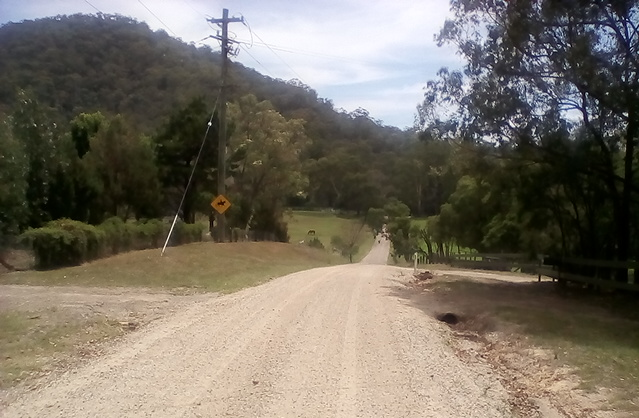
Looking north toward the Colo River, Upper Colo River NSW

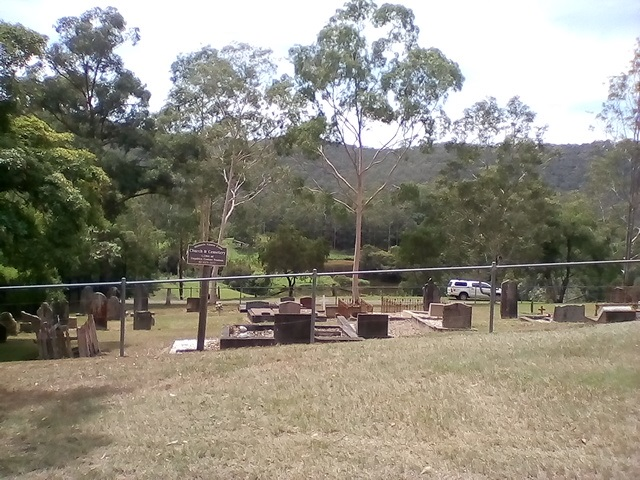
Upper Colo, New South Wales, looking east

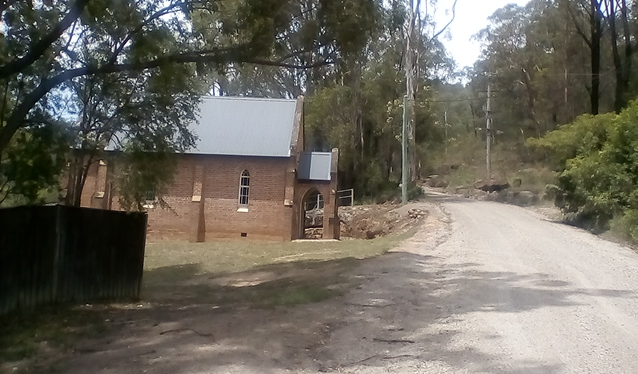
Upper Colo River Anglican Church, Australia
