= Narara (ship) =

Australian screw steamer (1900–1909)

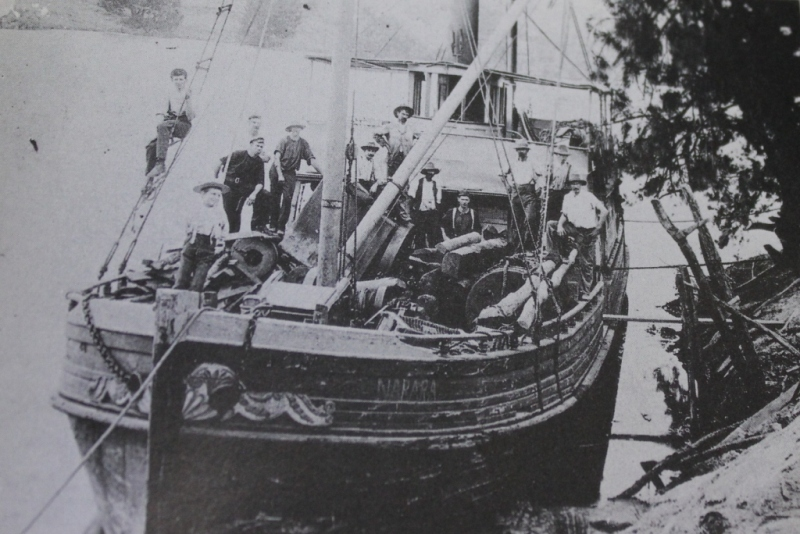
- SS Narrara circa 1905

History
- Name: Narara
- Owner: Messrs D A Mitchell and T H Johnston Hawkesbury Steam Navigation Company's
- Port of registry: (United Kingdom) Sydney (Pre Federation of Australia); (Australia) Sydney (1901–1909)
- Builder: Jervis Bay, New South Wales, Australia
- Completed: 1900
- Maiden voyage: on or about 16 January 1900
- In service: 1900
- Out of service: 1909/05/29
- Identification: Sydney registration number: 1/1900 Ship official number: 112479
- Fate: Wrecked 29 May 1909

General characteristics
- Type: Wood carvel screw steamer
- Tonnage: 71 GRT; 48 NRT
- Length: 79 ft 8 in (24.28 m)
- Beam: 18 ft 9 in (5.72 m)
- Draught: 5 ft 8 in (1.73 m)
- Installed power: Compound
- Crew: 7

Narara was a wooden carvel screw steamer built in 1900 at Jervis Bay, that was wrecked when it sprang a leak while carrying general cargo between Sydney and the Hawkesbury River and was lost at 2 ml SE off Little Reef Newport near, Barranjoey, New South Wales on 29 May 1909. The vessel commenced her runs from Sydney Harbour to the Hawkesbury River in January 1900 and continued on this run till the time of her final 1909 sinking. During 1903 the vessel was burned to the water line and sank at its mooring only to be refloated and rebuilt and started back on the same run.

== Description and construction ==
The Narara was a wooden vessel, and was built at Jervis Bay In 1900 she was 79 feet 8 inches (24.28 m) long, 18 feet 9 inches (5.72 m) broad, and 5 feet 8 inches (1.73 m) deep her owners were Messrs D.A. Mitchell and T.H. Johnston She has traded regularly between Sydney and the Hawkesbury River ever since she was placed In commission. She was insured for £1,250

A photo of the SS Hawkesbury and SS Narara at the junction of the Colo and Hawkesbury Rivers in 1904 can be found here

== Ship service history ==
=== Early career ===
The SS Narara commenced her runs from Sydney Harbour to the Hawkesbury River on or about 16 January 1900 and was described she “can get along at a good speed.”

At about the same time The SS Narara, owned by the Gosford Steamship Company was described as

Presently running two weekly trips on the river on behalf of the Hawkesbury Steam Navigation Company, The Narara is a recently built boat, and is an excellent cargo vessel.

The vessel soon became a part of the small local community as indicated when its ships engineer Mr Greentree taking part in local sculling races at the time

A boat race between Mr John Greentree and Mr Samuel Morley was pulled on the Sackville course, 2 1/2 miles, on Saturday of last week, for a stake of £10, when Jolly Jack was the victor. The SS Narara followed the scullers, and on the banks of the river were many spectators. It is probable that the same two will meet again in a few weeks for a larger stake.

While in 1902 and 1903 the vessel became involved in some cases before the courts when Helen Ashwin Mitchell wife of Frederick Newton Mitchell, of Lower Portland, Hawkesbury River sought to sue the Sydney Harbour Trust Commissioners for the sum of £200 as damages as when the steamer Narara landed at Russell's wharf on 14 January 1902 a heavy door or hatch suddenly swung open and knocked Mrs Mitchell down as she was passing along the footway, and inflicted serious injuries. The court found in favour of her, but assessed the damages sustained by her at £50.

Yet in May 1903 Samuel James Crosland, 23 was found guilty and was fined £15, in default four months imprisonment for having stolen from the steamer Narara two silver watches and one gold chain, valued in all at £6, the property of David Austin Mitchell (the owner of the vessel). When Samuel Crosland was arrested he admitted having taken the watches, and he said he had hidden them behind some sacks on the wharf. The chain, he stated, had been pawned at a shop in George Street West.

=== 1903 fire and sinking ===
At midnight of Sunday 23 August 1903 the Narara was burnt to the water line and sank. At the time it was described as

The river steamer Narara trading between Sackville and Sydney and owned by Messrs Mitchell and Johnston was burned to the water’s edge at midnight on Sunday and being scuttled sank at her moorings in Sackville Reach She had only arrived from Sydney the night before and contained a cargo of goods for settlers In the vicinity The crew were asleep below and had just time to escape with what they had on. The origin of the fire is unknown. The vessel which insured had lately been overhauled. The steamer Hawkesbury was at one time burned to the water s edge and sank, and on another occasion sank after striking a rock within a short distance of where the present disaster occurred.

Approximately a month later

The small steamship Narara, a well known trader between Sydney and the Hawkesbury River, which a few weeks ago was almost completely destroyed by fire and sank in the Hawkesbury, has been raised and left yesterday in tow of a steam tug for Sydney She will be repaired here, and will again enter the Hawkesbury trade.

== Shipwreck ==
What nonsense; put it all on, and let's get in, anyhow

— Master of the vessel, Frederick Petersen

On the night of 28 – 29 May 1909 there was a very heavy fog from Midnight till daylight, The Narara a left Sydney as usual at about midnight on Friday with a cargo for the Hawkesbury with the ship's company numbering seven hands all told. There were no sensational incidents connected with the wreck. Everything went well until the Narara had completed half of her journey at the Marine Court of Inquiry. The master of the vessel, Frederick Petersen, gave evidence that:

When the disaster occurred he was on the way to the Hawkesbury with-a mixed cargo. The only persons on watch were the engineer, a fireman, and himself. He cleared the Heads at about 1.30 a.m., and steered about north. He did not set any compass course, as it was a bright night. There was a light westerly breeze and smooth sea. When in the middle of Narrabeen Bight the engineer came on deck, and reported that the vessel was making water. Witness replied, "What nonsense; put it all on, and let's get in, anyhow." He made no examination, but he was called by the engineer again ten minutes afterwards. He then went down to the engine room and found water up to the engineer's waist. He had the crew called, and the boat was got out, the engines being stopped. By the time they got it in the water, steam was too low for the engines to be started again, and the steamer was therefore abandoned. She went down at about 4.30 a.m. They were about a mile and a half off the land. The crew landed at Barranjoey at about 8 o'clock. He could give no reason for the steamer making water as she did.

The engineer, Ephraim Greentree, in his evidence said:

That the water was a foot or 18 inches over the floor when he first noticed it. He told the captain about it, and put on the pumps. The captain told him to let him know if the water gained on them. In ten minutes the water was up to his waist. The captain then ordered the dock pumps to be started, but the water gained on them too quickly for them to do any good, and the steam went down. The steamer, since her last overhaul, had not made any water. He had not felt her strike anything.

== Wreck site ==
The steamer Narara foundered about a mile and a half off the land; off Little Reef, south of Barranjoey, with Barranjoey Lighthouse, about 1½ mile distant and the vessel foundering in deep water close to Little Reef
