= Cumberland Reach =

- Suburb
- Coordinates: 33°27′22″S 150°53′46″E
- Country: Australia
- State: New South Wales
- City: Sydney
- LGA: City of Hawkesbury
- Location: 81 km (50 mi) from Sydney CBD

Government
  - State electorate: Hawkesbury
  - Federal division: Macquarie
- Elevation: 97 m (318 ft)

Population
  - Total: 208 (2021 census)
- Postcode: 2756
Suburbs around Cumberland Reach
Lower Portland	Lower Portland	Lower Portland
Lower Portland	Cumberland Reach	Lower Portland
Sackville North	Sackville North	Sackville North

Cumberland Reach is a town in Sydney, in the state of New South Wales, Australia. It is located in the City of Hawkesbury north of Sackville. The locality of Cumberland Reach is unusual in that it is an enclave surrounded completely by the locality of Lower Portland (although, its southern boundary is directly across the Hawkesbury River from Sackville North).
