= Central Colo =

- Suburb
- Coordinates: 33°25′S 150°47′E
- Country: Australia
- State: New South Wales
- City: Sydney
- LGA: City of Hawkesbury
- Location: 87 km (54 mi) NW of Sydney CBD

Government
  - State electorate: Hawkesbury
  - Federal division: Macquarie
- Elevation: 10 m (33 ft)
- Postcode: 2756
Suburbs around Central Colo
Colo Heights	Yengo National Park	Yengo National Park
Upper Colo	Central Colo	Colo
Blaxlands Ridge	Wheeny Creek	Colo

Central Colo is a suburb of Sydney, in the state of New South Wales, Australia. It is located in the City of Hawkesbury west of Colo and to the south of the Colo River near its confluence with the Hawkesbury River.
