= Sackville North =

- Suburb
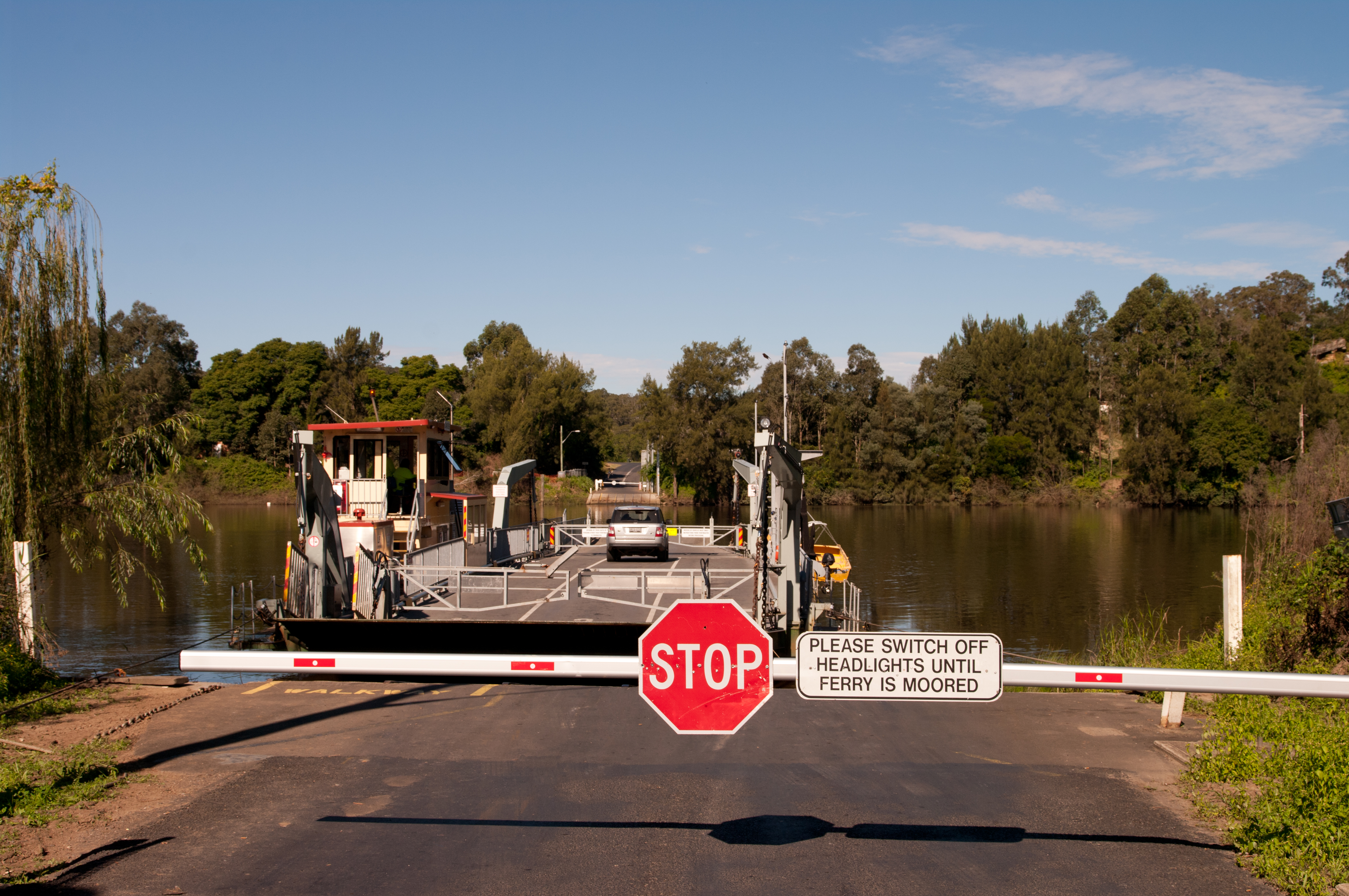
- Sackville Ferry departing from the Sackville North side of the Hawkesbury River in 2012

- Country: Australia
- State: New South Wales
- City: Sydney
- LGA: The Hills Shire
- Location: 80 km (50 mi) north-west of Sydney CBD

Government
  - State electorate: Hawkesbury
  - Federal division: Berowra
- Elevation: 81 m (266 ft)

Population
  - Total: 388 (2021 census)
- Postcode: 2756
Suburbs around Sackville North
Cumberland Reach	Lower Portland	Lower Portland
East Kurrajong	Sackville North	South Maroota
Sackville	Ebenezer	South Maroota

Sackville North is a suburb of Sydney, in the state of New South Wales, Australia 80 kilometres north-west of the Sydney central business district in the local government area of The Hills Shire.

Sackville North is adjacent to Sackville which is a separate suburb located in the City of Hawkesbury. Sackville North is a fairly isolated rural area, surrounded on the north, west and south by the Hawkesbury River. There are no shops or service stations in the suburb, which largely comprises holdings of 2 to 10 hectares (5 to 25 acres), with a few larger properties of 40 hectares or more.

== History ==
Sackville Reach, a portion of the Hawkesbury River, was named after Viscount Sackville (1716–1785) in the early years of European settlement. Sackville North's name was in common usage for many years but was not officially adopted by the Geographical Names Board of New South Wales until 1996.

Sackville School Post Office opened on 1 March 1911, was renamed Sackville North in December of the same year and closed in 1957. It reopened in 1963 and closed again in 1975.

== Commercial area ==
The nearest commercial centres are to the west across the river. Crossing the Hawkesbury by the Sackville Ferry (and so leaving Sydney) is Ebenezer (5 km), then some of the "Five Macquarie Towns" Wilberforce (15 km), Windsor (20 km), Richmond (25 km), which were established by Governor Lachlan Macquarie in 1811. The main road to Sydney is via Windsor.

== Transport ==
River Road passes the water ski resort of Dargle to the north of the suburb and again crosses the Hawkesbury River by the Lower Portland Ferry.

The route to the west leads to either Pitt Town (another of the "Five Macquarie Towns"), to the historic town of Wisemans Ferry, or to the Old Northern Road, an alternate route to Sydney. The latter does not cross the Hawkesbury and is the only access during river floods.

== Education ==
Brewongle Environmental Education Centre on Chapel Hill Road is a NSW government run school. It is on the site of the old Sackville North Public School, a NSW Heritage listed site, which has an 1878 sandstone classroom and residence. It is set in sclerophyll forest which is part of the Hawkesbury Valley system. This setting offers unique opportunity for children to study many different ecosystems and how humans have interacted with them, from the Dreamtime to the present.

== Landmarks ==
Below Brewongle, on Mud Island Road, is an 1869 sandstone church and graveyard (the Sackville North Methodist Church and Cemetery). Nearby is the sandstone vicarage. The church and vicarage are now private properties. There are some other historic dwellings and remains from early settlement along Mud Island Road adjacent to the Sackville Reach section of the Hawkesbury.

Sackville Cemetery located on Sackville Ferry Road was dedicated on 2 December 1899. It was also known as "Maroota General Cemetery".
