= Great Drain =

Historic place in New South Wales, Australia

- Location within New South Wales Location within Australia
- 33°30′40″S 150°55′38″E
- Location: Wisemans Ferry Road, South Maroota, The Hills Shire, New South Wales, Australia

History
- Built: 1795–1820

Site notes
- Owner: The Hills Shire Council

New South Wales Heritage Register
- Official name: Great Drain and two house sites
- Type: state heritage (archaeological-terrestrial)
- Designated: 14 July 2000
- Reference no.: 1402
- Type: Irrigation Channel/Canal
- Category: Utilities – Water
- Builders: Probably William Barren and William Harvey, stonemasons

The Great Drain is a heritage-listed former farm and cottage located on the Wisemans Ferry Road in the outer Sydney suburb of South Maroota, New South Wales, Australia. It was built from 1795 to 1820 by probably by William Barren and William Harvey, stonemasons. The property is owned by The Hills Shire Council and was added to the New South Wales State Heritage Register on 14 July 2000, where it is alternatively known as the Great Drain and two house sites. It now functions as a reserve including a motorcycle track and overnight accommodation.

Access to the heritage site is from 274 Pacific Park Rd, South Maroota which, in 2019, was the site of Pacific Park Water Ski Gardens & Motorcycle Park.

== History ==
Charles Williams, who arrived on the First Fleet, came to the Hawkesbury district in 1794 after the death of his wife near his earlier Parramatta farm. He left his farm near Windsor c. 1795 and at some time before 1810 occupied (without a grant) the land where the Great Drain was later constructed. The property was known as Williams' Farm and it is likely that he built the house with the stone foundations on the rocky slope to the south of the farmland, above the level of the floods of the early 19th century.

In 1810 the land, excluding the house site with stone foundations, was granted to Samuel Carr, who leased it to George Cox from 1813 to 1815. Cox ran pigs and grew grain. During the 1810s the rock cut foundations for a slab house known as Collingwood Cottage was cut, probably by stonemasons supplied through Andrew Johnston to freesettlers whose Portland Head Farm lay opposite.

Johnston's son and daughter-in-law, William and Mary Johnston, acquired the farm in 1819 and occupied the cottage known as Collingwood Cottage and probably constructed the Great Drain, again using Andrew Johnston's stonemasons.

The house constructed with stone house foundations remained on a riverside reserved strip although the intrusion of crescent reserve (portion 8) was granted to the Johnston family.

A couple still lived in the slab cottage until the 1930s when it was demolished. The swamp was stabilised by used tyres under George Johnston in the 1960s and portion ten became first a water-ski lodge in the 1980s and a motorcycle track on the 1990s.

== Description ==
The Great Drain is cut into sandstone for 70 metres (230 ft), 6.5 metres (21 ft) deep and at the top 2.3 metres (7 ft 7 in) wide, connecting swampy farmland with the Hawkesbury River. Excavated by pick and by gunpowder (some drill holes). Rock cutting for sluice gates at deepest point, with joist holes. To the east of cutting an earthwork channel goes into a paddock.

The rock cut serves as foundations for slab house. The rock outcrop artificially drilled creating three rooms and verandah in an L-shape. Stone thresholds flanked by square post holes gave access and a fireplace and oven bases are carved into rock. Verandah supported by stone embankment.

The stone house foundations on flood free slope above the farmland facing north from course of well arranged rubble stone: On the north wall, ten stones measuring 2.9 metres (9 ft 6 in) in height; on the east wall, four stones (one in common), measuring 1.7 metres (5 ft 7 in); and a south extension wall of six stones (one in common), measuring 1.8 metres (5 ft 11 in) in height. Accessible only by water until c. 1960s.

=== Condition ===
As at 30 January 1998, the physical condition of the drain was good; the rock cut foundations were fair; and the stone house foundations were fair. The archaeological potential for all items is high.

=== Modifications and dates ===
The following modifications have been made to the group:

- Great Drain – concrete sluice gates (extant) inserted just west of original sluice gates; and
- Rock cut foundations – slab cottage built on the foundations was demolished in the 1930s.

== Heritage listing ==
As at 19 December 1997, the three items in the group, dating between 1795 and 1830, are historically extremely rare and associated with a series of early Hawkesbury settlers (Williams, Carr, Cox, Johnston) predating official settlement down river. They are aesthetically valuable because of the siting in bushland of the house foundations and the dramatic vistas within the cutting of the Great Drain. They are scientifically extremely significant because they provide unique information about drainage and house building techniques.

Great Drain was listed on the New South Wales State Heritage Register on 14 July 2000 having satisfied the following criteria.

The place is important in demonstrating the course, or pattern, of cultural or natural history in New South Wales.

The Great Drain is a unique early work of magnitude to control drainage on the Lower Hawkesbury with a sophisticated sluice to repel tidal or flood water from the river. The rock cut foundations are unique in slab buildings and belongs to the Macquarie period. The stone house foundations are extremely early (1795-1810) and are associated with an interesting first fleet convict, Charles Williams.

The place is important in demonstrating aesthetic characteristics and/or a high degree of creative or technical achievement in New South Wales.

The Great Drain cuts a swathe through solid rock and can be entered from below as well as viewed from above. The stone house foundations are in a fine situation above the river in bushland.

The place has potential to yield information that will contribute to an understanding of the cultural or natural history of New South Wales.

The Great Drain is the only evidence for elaborate drainage works in so early a period outside Sydney. The rock cut foundations give unique evidence of a vernacular slab building technique.

== See also ==
- Australian archaeology
- Historical archaeology in Australia
