= Mountain Lagoon =

- Suburb
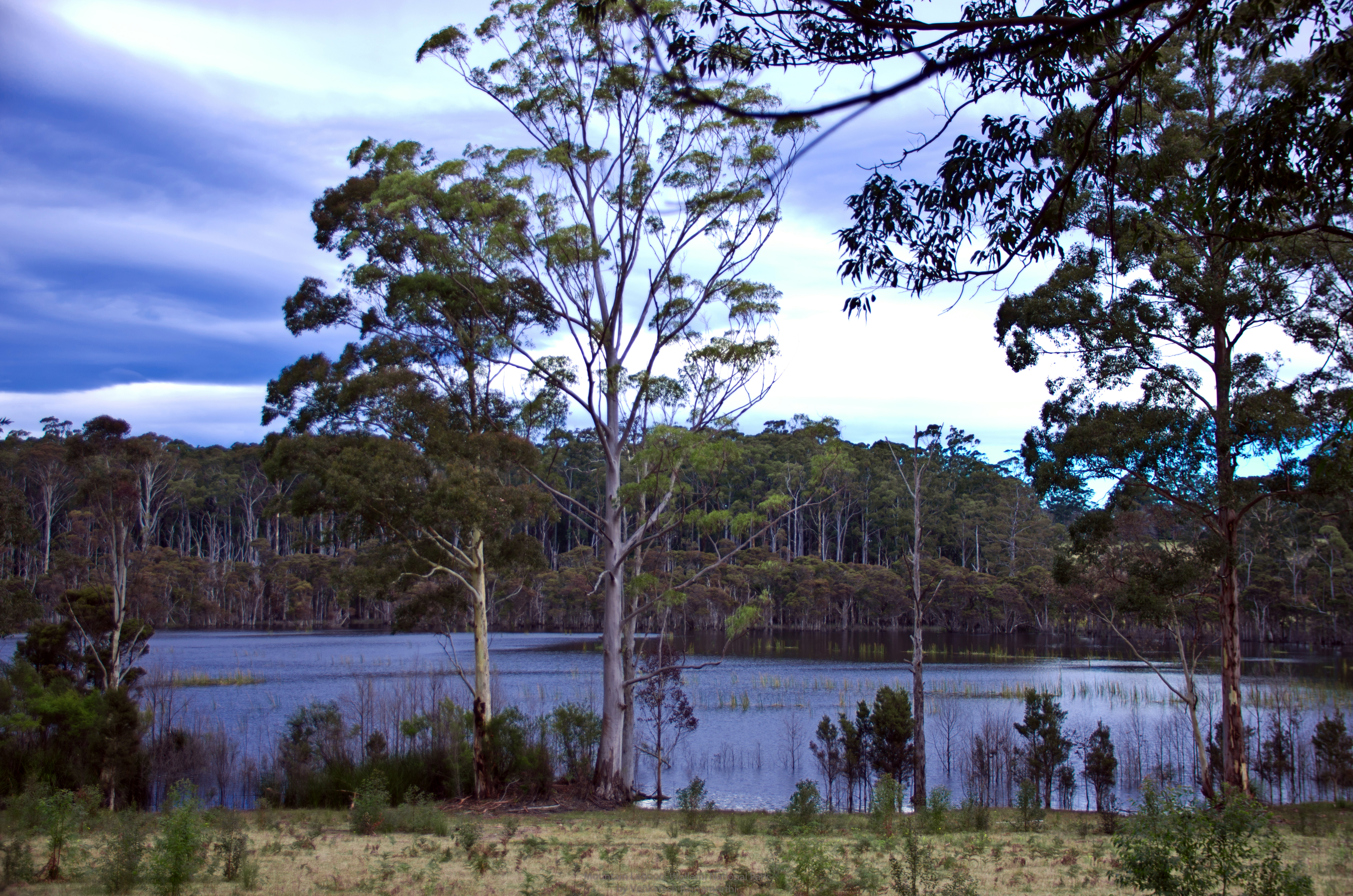
- Mountain Lagoon is an unusual feature caused by geological tilting of the plateau.

- Coordinates: 33°26′25″S 150°38′05″E
- Country: Australia
- State: New South Wales
- City: Sydney
- LGA: City of Hawkesbury
- Location: 103 km (64 mi) NW of Sydney CBD; 64 km (40 mi) E of Lithgow

Government
  - State electorate: Hawkesbury
  - Federal division: Macquarie
- Elevation: 517 m (1,696 ft)

Population
  - Totals: 327 (2011 census); 78 (2021 census)
- Postcode: 2758
Suburbs around Mountain Lagoon
Blue Mountains National Park	Colo Heights	Upper Colo
Blue Mountains National Park	Mountain Lagoon	Blaxlands Ridge
Bilpin	Kurrajong Heights	Kurrajong Hills

Mountain Lagoon is a small village north of Bilpin in Wollemi National Park in New South Wales, Australia in the City of Hawkesbury. The lagoon itself is an unusual feature caused by geological tilting of the plateau, located on a ridge-top above the elevation where lakes would commonly be found in this geological area. This is because of the mountain's uplift twisting the local drainage pattern. The lagoon is on private property, but can be seen from Sams Way, which encircles the lake. Part of Sams Way has been planted as an avenue of exotic trees and shrubs that have autumn and spring foliage contrasting with the native evergreen flora.
