= South Maroota =

- Suburb
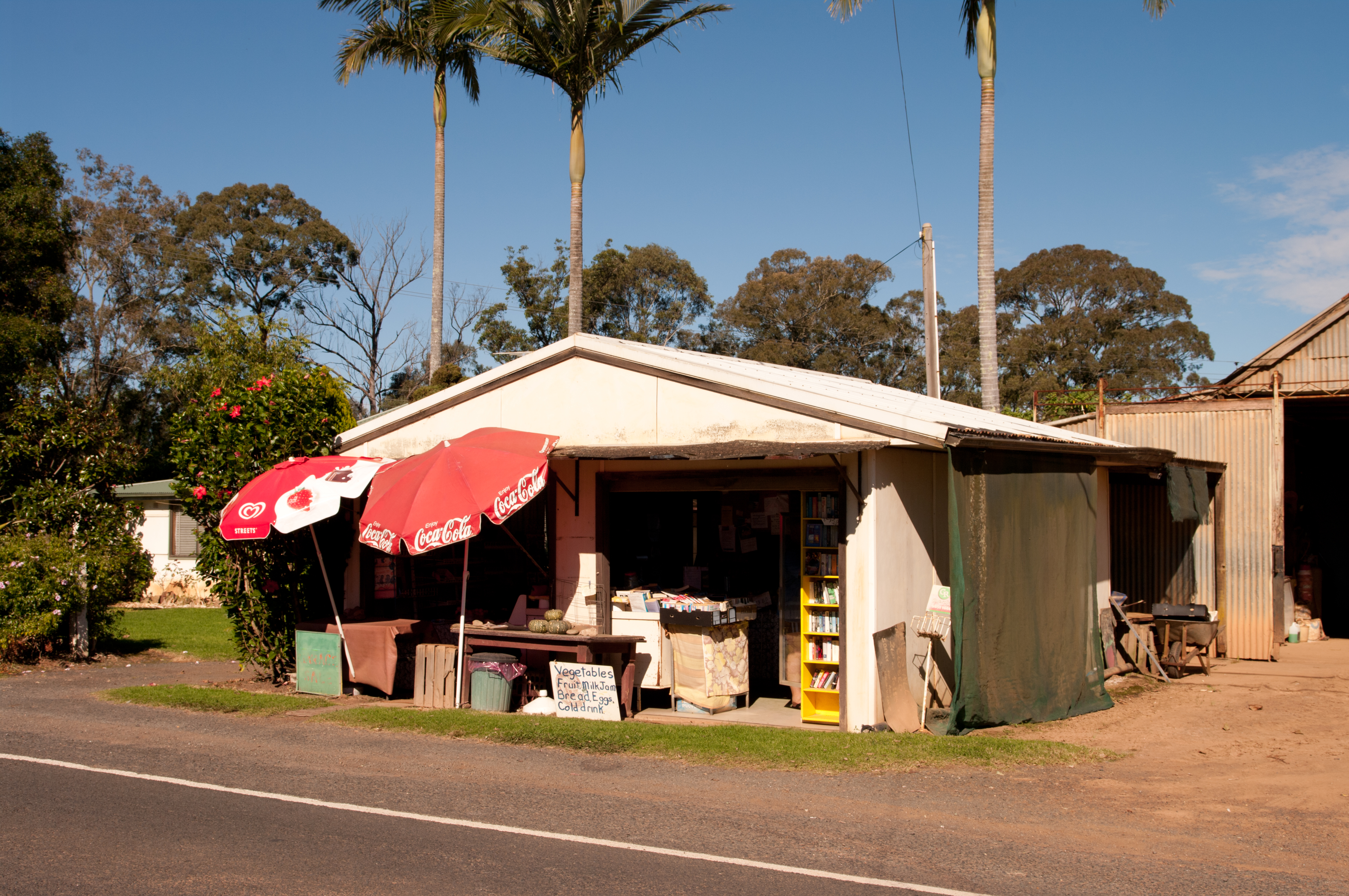
- Store in South Maroota

- Coordinates: 33°31′27″S 150°56′55″E
- Country: Australia
- State: New South Wales
- LGA: The Hills Shire
- Location: 72 km (45 mi) northwest of Sydney CBD

Government
  - State electorate: Hawkesbury
  - Federal division: Berowra
- Elevation: 124 m (407 ft)

Population
  - Total: 613 (2021 census)
- Postcode: 2756
Suburbs around South Maroota
Sackville North	Lower Portland	Maroota
Ebenezer	South Maroota	Glenorie
Wilberforce and Pitt Town	Cattai	Glenorie

South Maroota is a suburb in Sydney, New South Wales, Australia 72 kilometres north-west of the Sydney central business district in the local government area of The Hills Shire. The Hawkesbury River forms part of its western boundary.

== Heritage listings ==
South Maroota has a number of heritage-listed sites, including:

- Wisemans Ferry Road: Great Drain

== Recreation ==
South Maroota contains the Pacific Park motocross and water-skiing park, on the bank of the Hawkesbury River. In 1970 Sydney's largest naturist club Kiata Country Club was established
