= Ebenezer, New South Wales =

Ebenezer
- Suburb
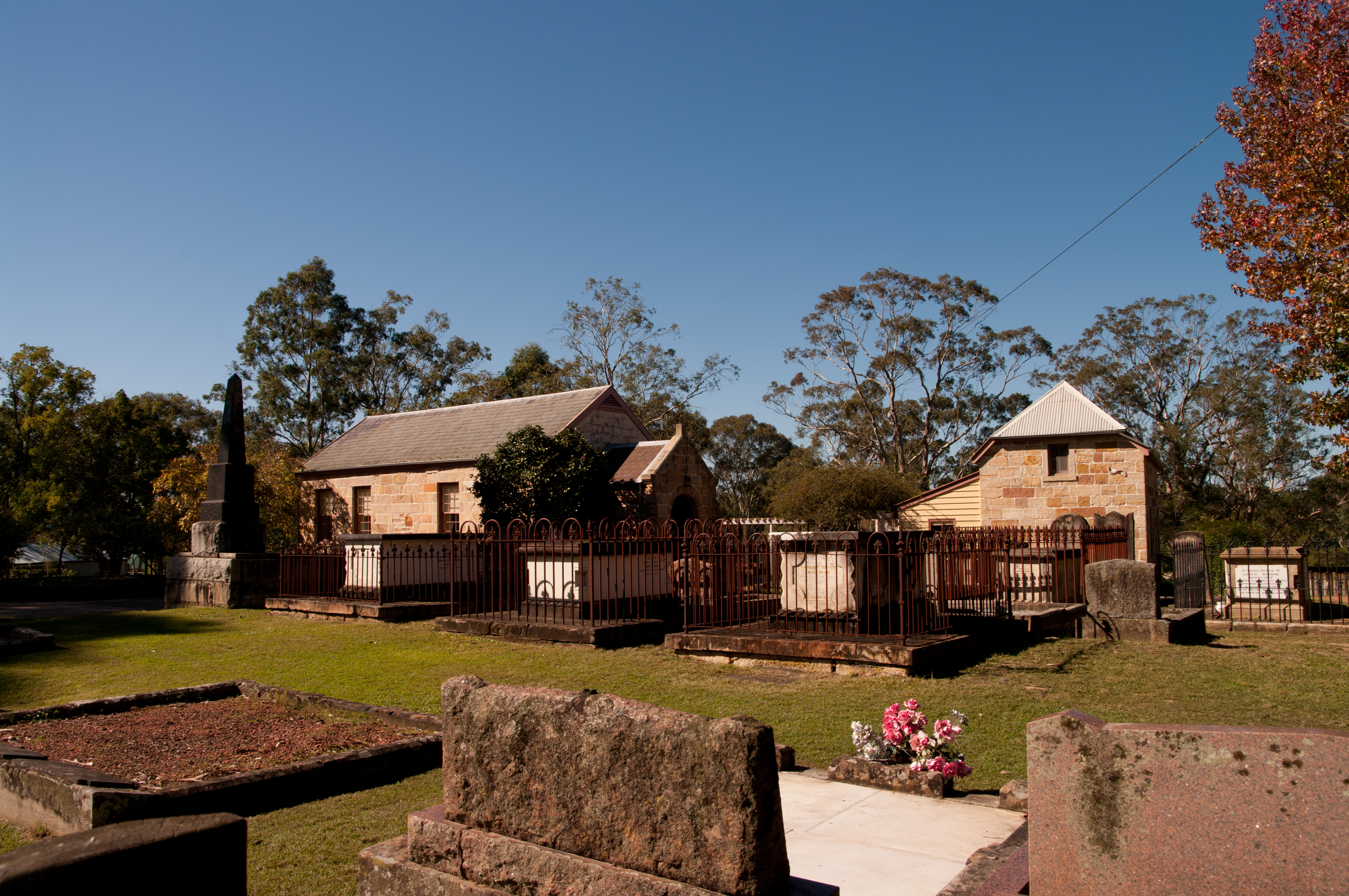
- Ebenezer church and grounds

- Coordinates: 33°31′54″S 150°52′4″E
- Country: Australia
- State: New South Wales
- LGA: City of Hawkesbury
- Location: 67 km (42 mi) north-west of Sydney CBD; 5 km (3.1 mi) north-east of Wilberforce

Government
  - State electorate: Hawkesbury
  - Federal division: Macquarie
- Elevation: 43 m (141 ft)

Population
  - Total: 1,081 (2021 census)
- Postcode: 2756
Suburbs around Ebenezer
| East Kurrajong | Sackville | Sackville North |
| East Kurrajong | Ebenezer | South Maroota |
| Wilberforce | South Maroota | South Maroota |

Ebenezer is a historic town in New South Wales, Australia, in the local government area of the City of Hawkesbury. Ebenezer is located 69 kilometres north-west of Sydney and about 5 kilometres from the larger centre of Wilberforce. It sits on the banks of the Hawkesbury River and like typical early 19th century villages in NSW, it straggles along the roads rather than compactly around a village centre.

== History ==
The town was named after Eben-Ezer in the Bible, 1 Samuel 7:12, wherein Samuel set up a stone between Mizpah and Shen and gave the name to Ebenezer.

The Ebenezer Church is listed on the New South Wales Heritage Register.

== Church ==
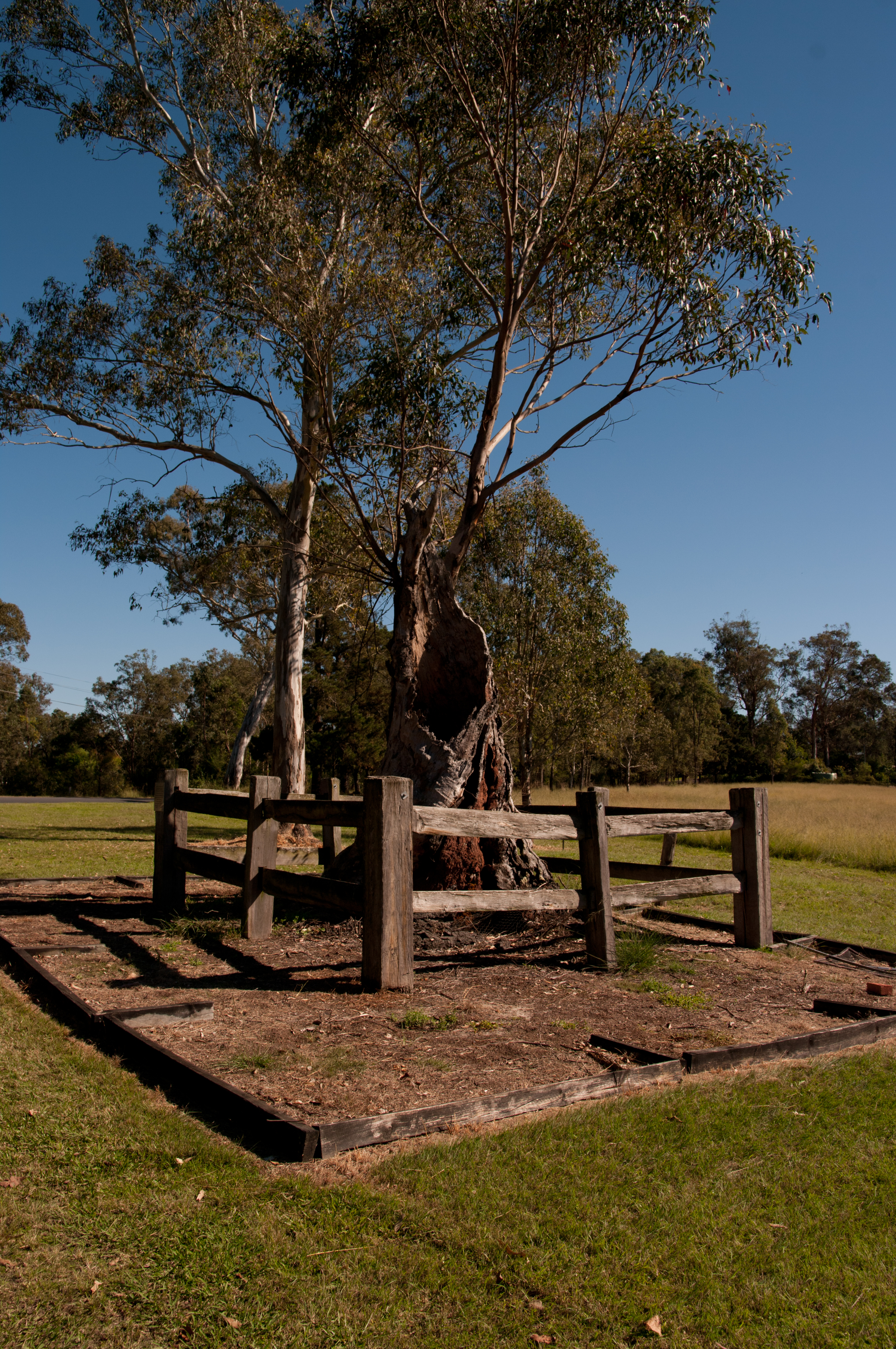
Tree where the early services were held

Ebenezer Uniting Church, on the banks of the Hawkesbury River, was originally a Presbyterian chapel which is the oldest standing church building in Australia. The area was settled in 1803 by a number of free settler families who sailed to Australia on the Coromandel in 1802. These settlers worshipped under a local gum tree, which still exists on the opposite side of the road from the church. James Mein, an elder of Galashiels Kirk started holding informal services in his house at Portland and from these meetings grew a desire to build the church at Ebenezer.

One of the important families in the area was the Grono family, early boat builders who built boats up to 200 tons on the Hawkesbury. They and other local families, mostly Scots who had emigrated from London, assisted in building a simple sandstone church, which was cut from sandstone along the banks of the river. The church was built in 1808-09 but not finally fitted out until 1817. An early clergyman at the church was John Youl.

Its restoration has been done with recognition of the church's importance and is still used for Sunday services. More like a crofter's cottage than a church, the stone entrance porch was added in 1929 and the eastern vestry in 1966. The cedar bookcase in the porch belonged to the first minister, Dr John McGarvie, who lived in Ebenezer from 1826 to 1831.

The first burial in 1812 was in the churchyard cemetery. Coffins were brought to the church by the river, with boatloads of mourners joining the funeral procession as it was rowed along the Hawkesbury. The cemetery is one of the most important in Australia with six generations buried in its grounds, including some of the first free settlers in the colony.

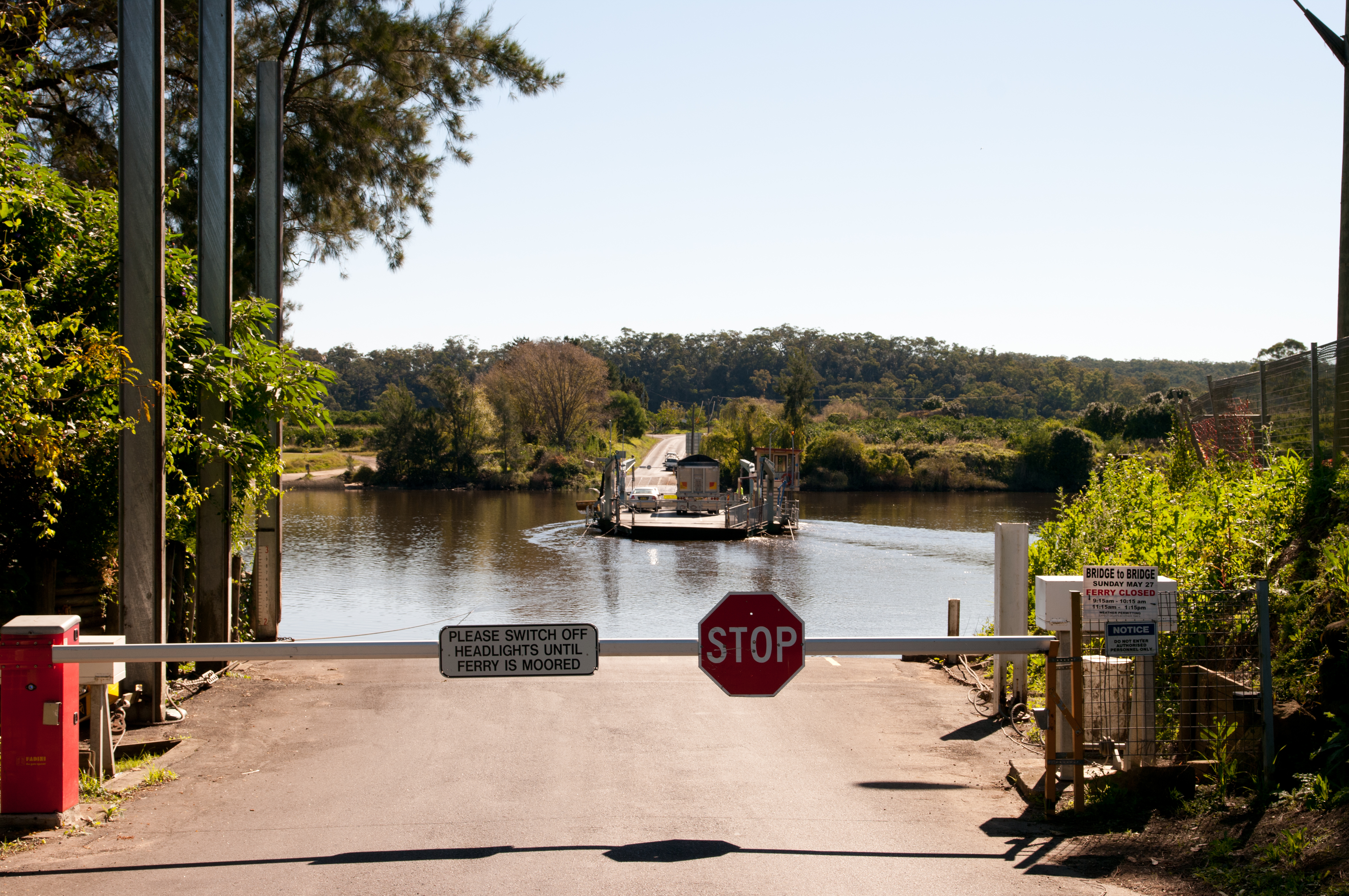
Sackville ferry going to Ebenezer

== Schools ==
The school at Ebenezer was opened in 1810 under the headmastership of John Youl, a layman of the Anglican Church. It operated out of the church until the 1880s when a public school was built. When this burnt down shortly afterwards, the school returned to the church. The building was a school during the week and a chapel on Sunday until the present public school opened in 1902. A schoolmaster's residence was built in 1817. It is now the oldest existing school building in Australia. The former schoolmaster's residence is used to serve Devonshire teas and has a small museum of photos and furniture, with records of the settlers from the Coomandel. Ebenezer Public School, built in 1902, is now a Primary school with enrolments about 120.

== Landmarks ==
=== John Turnbull's House ===
John Turnbull's House is on Old Port Eringhi Road, not far from Ebenezer Church and Schoolhouse and off Tizzana Road, this wonderful old sandstone 2 storey home is alongside new houses opposite the old golf course almost at the end of the road. Only the top of John's old 2 storey home can be seen from the road, since rampant vines and trees block the view. The front part of the home and the wall facing the old golf course was built about 1807, with the remainder completed about 1810. Lewis Jones, a stonemason was responsible for the construction of the home, as there appears to be a close connection between Jones & Ralph Turnbull the eldest son of Pioneer John Turnbull. His home is built on an 1803 land grant to John Turnbull, an enthusiastic supporter of the church at Ebenezer. Famous Presbyterian minister, John Dunmore Lang, used the house when he preached at Ebenezer in 1823–24. It has been only partly restored. At either end of the home, two huge fireplaces were constructed, close to 2 metres in height.

== Population ==
At the 2021 census, it had a population of 1,081.
