= Ebenezer Church (Australia) =

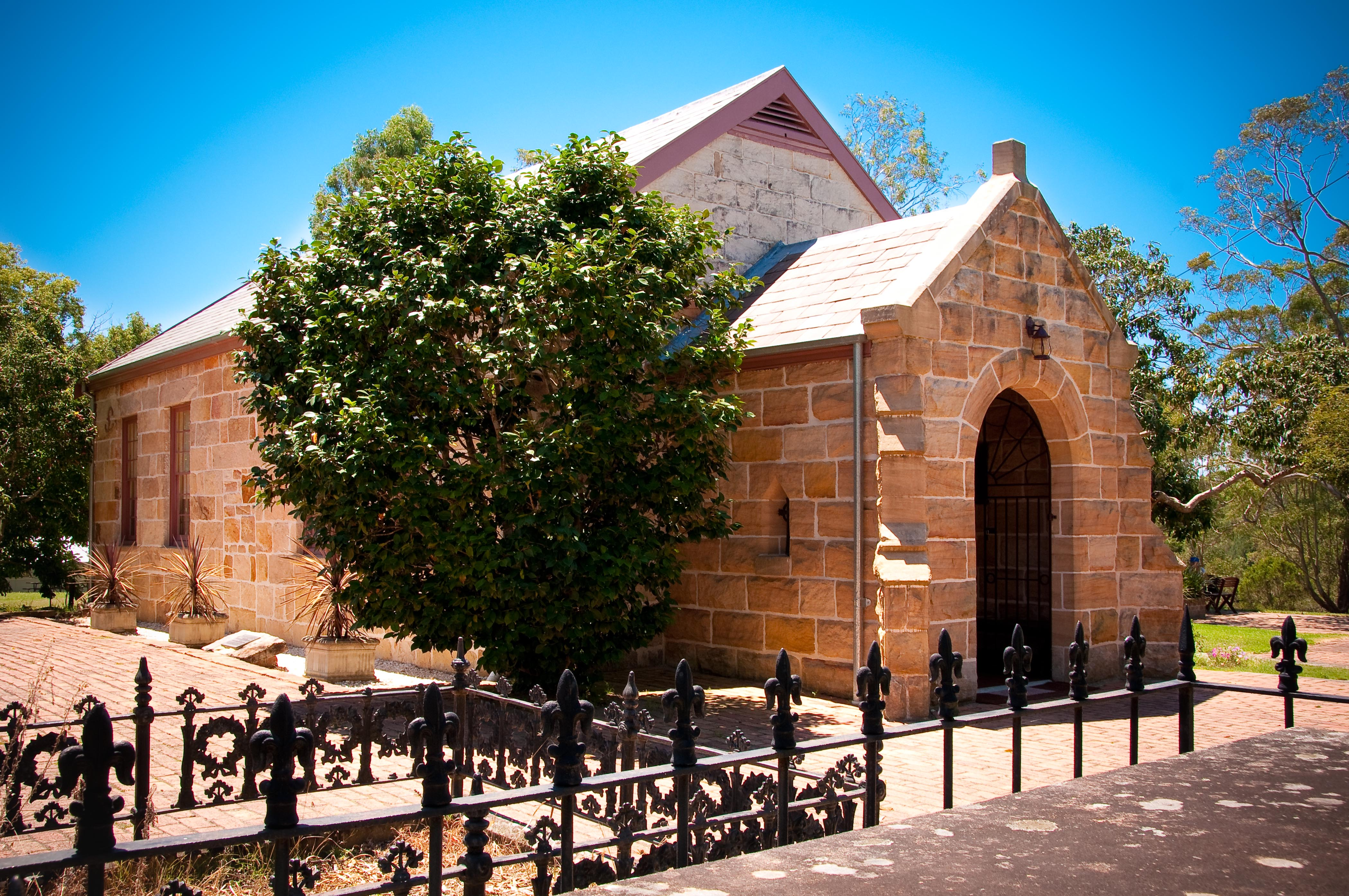
- Ebenezer Uniting Church, pictured in 2010

- Location within New South Wales
- 33°32′12″S 150°53′30″E
- Location: Coromandel Road, Ebenezer, City of Hawkesbury, New South Wales
- Country: Australia
- Denomination: Uniting Church
- Previous denomination: Presbyterianism
- Website: ebenezerchurch.org.au

History
- Former name: Ebenezer Presbyterian Church

Architecture
- Architect: Andrew Johnston
- Years built: 1809–1823

Administration
- Parish: Uniting Church Parish of Ebenezer Pitt Town

New South Wales Heritage Register
- Official name: Ebenezer Church (Uniting), Old Schoolhouse, Cemetery & Tree; Former Ebenezer Presbyterian Church
- Type: State heritage (complex / group)
- Designated: 2 April 1999
- Reference no.: 138
- Type: Church
- Category: Religion

The Ebenezer Church is a heritage-listed Uniting church and cemetery and former schoolhouse located at Coromandel Road, Ebenezer, City of Hawkesbury, New South Wales, Australia. It was designed by Andrew Johnston and built from 1809 to 1823. It is now part of the Uniting Church in Australia, having been a Presbyterian church prior to amalgamation. The church was added to the New South Wales State Heritage Register on 2 April 1999.

== History ==
Ebenezer Uniting Church is Australia's oldest remaining church. It was the first Presbyterian church in the colony and is the nation's oldest functioning church. Worship began on the site as early as 1803, when 15 families, under the leadership of Pastor James Mein, met beneath the tree which still stands adjacent to the church today. The Covenanted Membership of the Church which was formed in 1806, was made up of people of Methodist, Anglican and Catholic backgrounds with a core group of Coromandelers. A church which doubled as a school and chapel was built in 1809. The first burial occurred in 1812 and a cemetery was established in the churchyard. The schoolmaster's residence is believed to have been constructed in 1817. Ebenezer Church was the first and for many years the only church built and paid for by voluntary gifts and labour. It was formally established as a church of the Presbyterian Order in 1824.

The first ordained Minister to serve at Ebenezer was Dr John McGarvie, who was brought out to Sydney by the Rev. John Dunmore Lang in 1826 for this purpose. When Lang went overseas in 1830, McGarvie went back to Sydney to officiate at the Scots Church in Jamison Street and assist in the associated college.

The school at Ebenezer was opened in 1810 under the headmastership of John Youl, a layman of the Anglican Church. It operated out of the church until the 1880s when a public school was built. When this burned down shortly afterwards, the school returned to the church until the present public school opened in 1902.

In 1959 the church was extensively repaired and a vestry was built nearby. In 1985, a Heritage Council grant assisted the restoration of the Church, Vestry and Schoolmaster's Residence.

The pioneer families who worshipped at the Church were a vital part of the development of the Hawkesbury as the food bowl for the colony. Most of them supported Governor Bligh at the time of the Rum Rebellion. They made a significant contribution to commerce and government administration. Shipbuilding was a major enterprise of a number of local families.

== Description ==
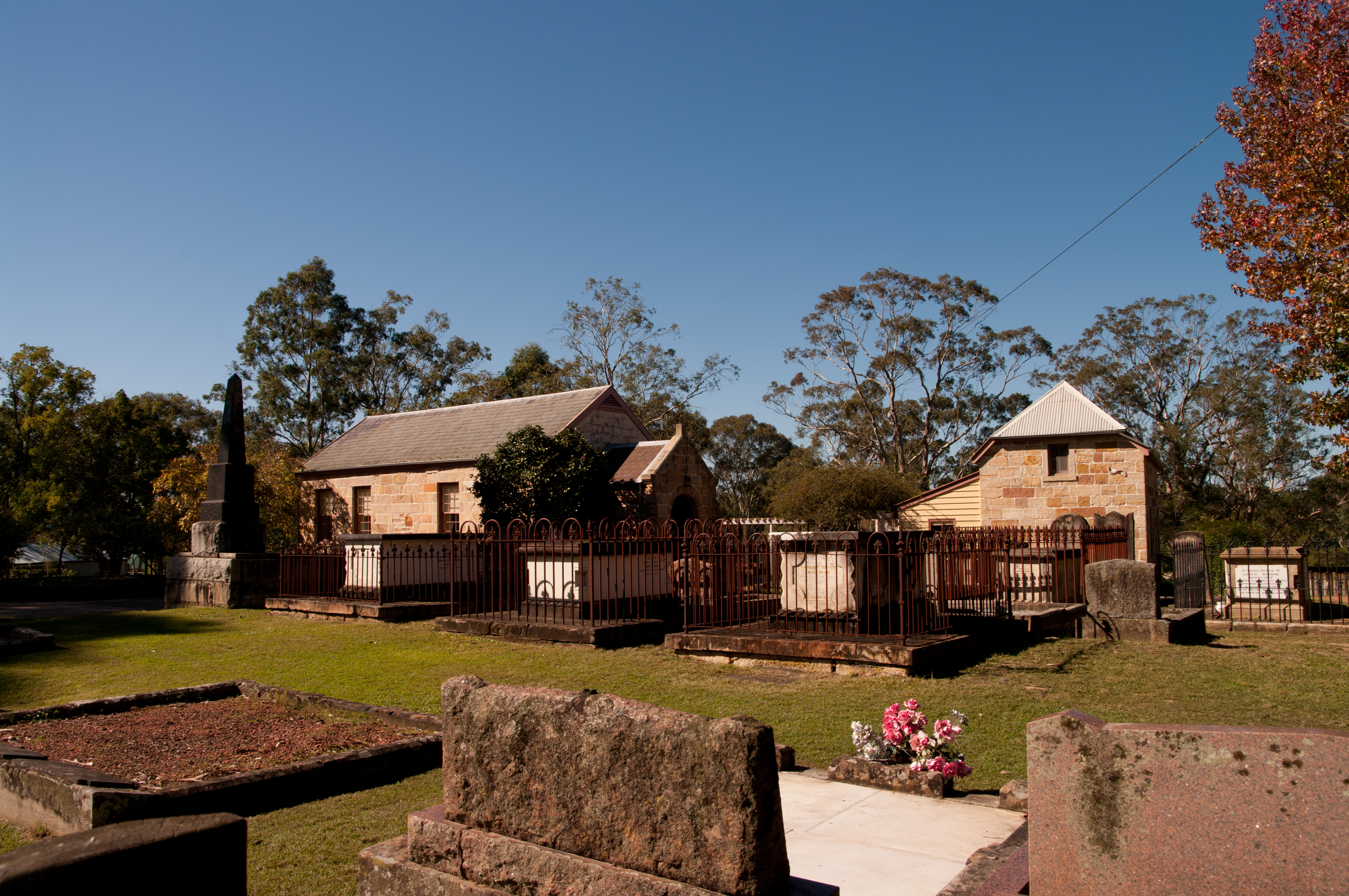
View through the cemetery

Ebenezer Church is located on a prominent ridge overlooking the Hawkesbury River.

=== Church ===
The church building is a very simple, unadorned structure, drawn from the vernacular architecture of its Scottish Presbyterian builders. Heavy stone blockwork walls and gables were used with a pitched slate roof. A porch of comparable size and texture was added in 1926.The 18 pane windows are double-hung. The church was originally built with two additional doors set into the side walls. These were filled in shortly after construction and the doors, step and path are still visible as a change in the block work and coursing.

The church was converted to its present form sometime after the construction of the school. There is some physical evidence of a temporary mezzanine level built before the church was commissioned by the Department of Education in 1887. During the late nineteenth century, guttering and rain water tanks were added. The church was repaired and ventilation slats were added when the vestry was built in 1959.

=== Church yard and grave yard ===
Sloping site with graves broadly west of the building complex, with some paved forecourt area from the street in to the church flanking the graveyard's northern edge. The eastern slope running down to the Hawkesbury River. This eastern slope of the church yard is predominantly grassed or grassland with some scattered remnant native Cumberland Plain Woodland trees.

=== Schoolmaster's residence ===
The schoolmaster's residence is of the same heavy construction as the church but has an unusual jerkinhead roof and raised stone window surrounds. A similar roof appears in the house of local Scottish settler John Turnbull. The windows are of the more common twelve pane variety. The annex on the northern side conceals elements of the original smaller annex, presumably built at the same time as the schoolhouse proper. This original annex was approximately 2.5m wide and ran from the living room door to the western corner of the schoolhouse. The east and west elevations were clad in vertical slab, while the north face appears to have been a rough weatherboarding. The annex was extended and clad with A/C panels some time this century. The remains of the original pergola and grape vine that extended to the living area door and smaller kitchen annex still exist.

=== Vestry ===
The vestry, added in 1959, is sympathetic to the scale and texture of the original buildings.

=== Modifications and dates ===
- pre-1879 – schoolhouse roofing replaced with corrugated iron.
- c. 1887 – guttering and rain water tank added to church. Possible mezzanine level added to church interior.
- 1926 – Church porch and role of honour added.
- 1959 – Vestry and covered way added, designed by Morton Herman. Ventilation slats added to church. All buildings repointed with a raised cement mortar.

== Heritage listing ==
Ebenezer Church is the oldest existing church in Australia, but it was not the first Church built. The first Church, built by the order of the colony's first chaplain, the Anglican Rev Richard Johnson, was made of wattle and daub and built on the corner of Bligh and Hunter Streets in 1793. It burned down in 1798.

Ebenezer Church is the first Presbyterian church and the oldest church still in use today. It has a unique place in the heritage of the Christian faith and the pioneer farming of the nation. The Church is an active congregation with a living history. Many of the families are descendants of the original Coromandel settlers. The cemetery is one of the most important in Australia. It has an association with six generations of Coromandel settlers.

The original structures display a high degree of technical competence. The simplicity and sturdiness of the buildings, particularly the church, can be seen as a manifestation of the way of life, taste and customs of the early Scottish Presbyterian settlers.

Ebenezer Church was listed on the New South Wales State Heritage Register on 2 April 1999 having satisfied the following criteria.

The place is important in demonstrating the course, or pattern, of cultural or natural history in New South Wales.

Ebenezer Church is the oldest extant church in Australia. It is the first Presbyterian church and the oldest church still in use today. Ebenezer represents the establishment of the Presbyterian Church in Australia.

Ebenezer has also established links with the development and politics of the early colony. The Protestant work ethic of the pioneers made a major contribution to shaping the Australian ethos.

The cemetery is one of the most important in Australia. It has an association with six generations of Coromandel settlers, who were some of the first free settlers in the colony.

The place is important in demonstrating aesthetic characteristics and/or a high degree of creative or technical achievement in New South Wales.

The original structures display a high degree of technical competence. The simplicity and sturdiness of the buildings, particularly the church, can be seen as a manifestation of the way of life, taste and customs of the early Scottish Presbyterian settlers, while preserving the autonomy of the schoolmaster's house. The structures are also enhanced by their backdrop of eucalyptus, open grassland and the river. The visual and physical relationship with the river is important in maintaining the identity of the church group. The setting gives a good idea of the conditions the original settlers found. The river is also significant in its function of carrying funeral processions to the site.

The place has strong or special association with a particular community or cultural group in New South Wales for social, cultural or spiritual reasons.

Ebenezer Church is an active congregation with a living history. Many of the families are descendants of the original Coromandel settlers.

The place has potential to yield information that will contribute to an understanding of the cultural or natural history of New South Wales.

The original structures display a high degree of technical competence. The simplicity and sturdiness of the buildings, particularly the church, can be seen as a manifestation of the way of life, taste and customs of the early Scottish Presbyterian settlers.

== See also ==
- Presbyterian Church of Australia
- Uniting Church in Australia
