= Colo Heights =

Coordinates: 33°22′08″S 150°43′19″E

- Suburb
- Interactive map of Colo Heights
- Country: Australia
- State: New South Wales
- City: Sydney
- LGA: City of Hawkesbury
- Location: 93 km (58 mi) NW of Sydney CBD

Government
  - Federal division: Greenway
- Elevation: 286 m (938 ft)

Population
  - Total: 334 (2016 census)
- Postcode: 2756
Suburbs around Colo Heights
Bogee	Womerah	Laguna
Wollangambe	Colo Heights	St Albans
Bilpin	Cumberland Reach	Webbs Creek and Lower Macdonald

Colo Heights is a village of Sydney, in the state of New South Wales, Australia. It is located in the City of Hawkesbury, north-west of Colo.
