= Sackville, New South Wales =

Sackville
- Suburb
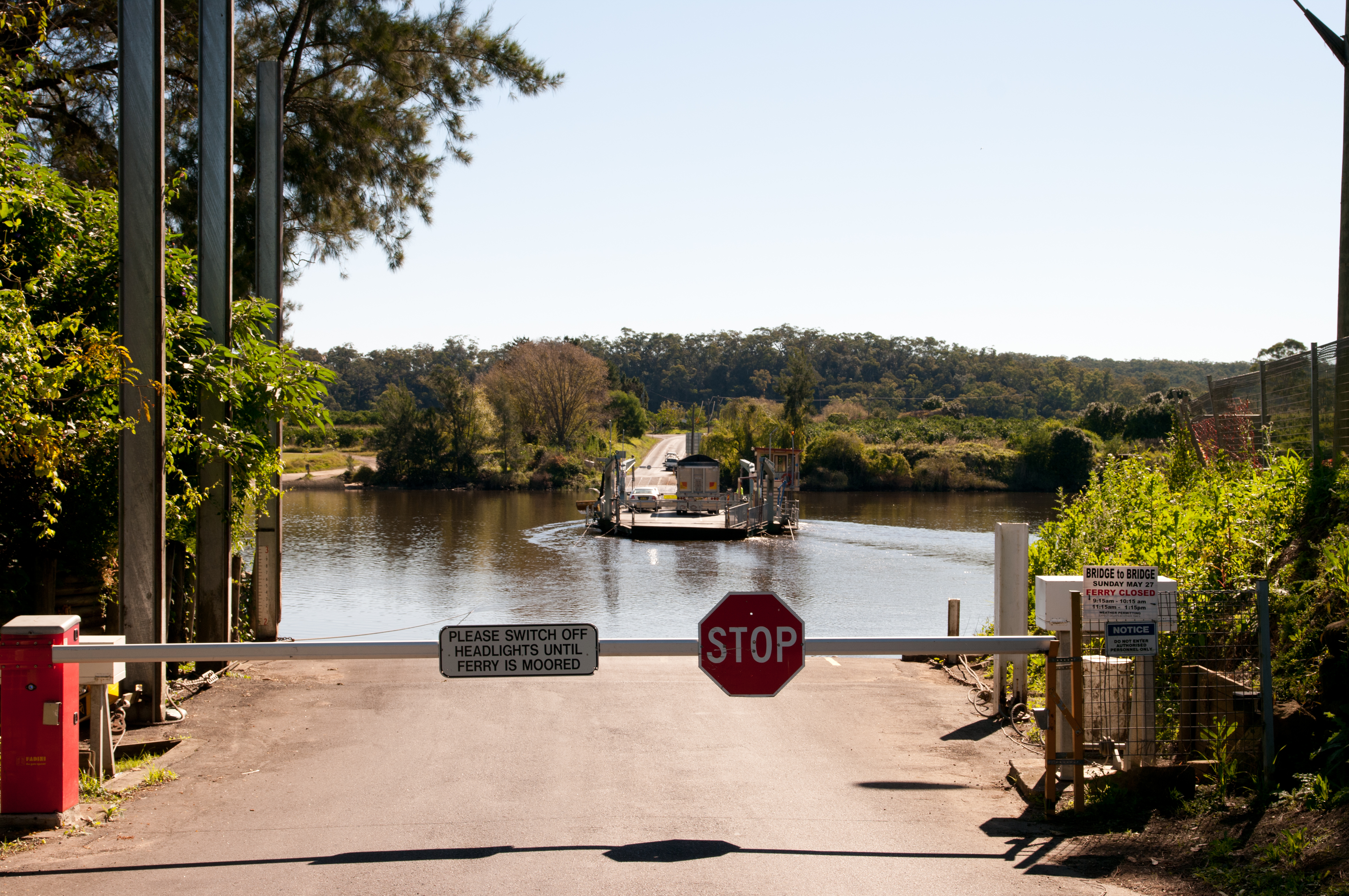
- Ferry crossing in 2012. Looking toward North Sackville.

- Interactive map of Sackville
- Coordinates: 33°29′S 150°54′E
- Country: Australia
- State: New South Wales
- City: Sydney
- LGA: City of Hawkesbury
- Location: 70 km (43 mi) from Sydney CBD

Government
  - State electorate: Hawkesbury
  - Federal division: Macquarie
- Elevation: 7 m (23 ft)

Population
  - Total: 230 (2021 census)
- Postcode: 2756
- County: Cumberland
- Parish: Cornelia
Suburbs around Sackville
East Kurrajong	Sackville North	Sackville North
East Kurrajong	Sackville	Sackville North
East Kurrajong	Wilberforce	Ebenezer

Sackville (Doorumbolooa) is a suburb of Sydney, in the state of New South Wales, Australia. It is located in the City of Hawkesbury and at the 2021 census had a population of 230, 22 of whom identified as Aboriginal and Torres Strait Islander (9.6%). Sackville is situated on the Hawkesbury River, and is the site of the Sackville Ferry, a car ferry that crosses the river to North Sackville. The suburb is home to five National Heritage Listed sites: Three residences, St Thomas' Anglican Church and the Sackville Cemetery, which dates back to 1828.

Sackville is bound by Ebenezer and Wilberforce to the south, East Kurrajong to the east and Lower Portland to the north.

== History ==
Located on the rich alluvial soil of the flood plains of the Hawkesbury, Sackville was close to a readily available fresh water supply, and had transportation links to Sydney via the Hawkesbury River. Sackville was first settled as a farming community by colonists in 1803, and the settlement was named after Viscount Sackville, the British Secretary of State for the Colonies between 1775 and 1782. Governor Arthur Phillip, travelling along the Hawkesbury River by boat, first encountered Indigenous people at present day Sackville in July 1789.

By 1828 following constant skirmishes with European settlers, and murders on both sides, Indigenous numbers dwindled. The Indigenous people necessarily grouped together to survive. Prominent families of the area included: Clark(e)s, Dillons, Everingham-Saunders, Barber-Morleys and Newmans. By 1862 the Aboriginal people in Sackville and La Perouse were the largest remaining groups in the Sydney region. Painted hands in a cave and rock engravings remain a testament to the Aboriginal presence in the area.

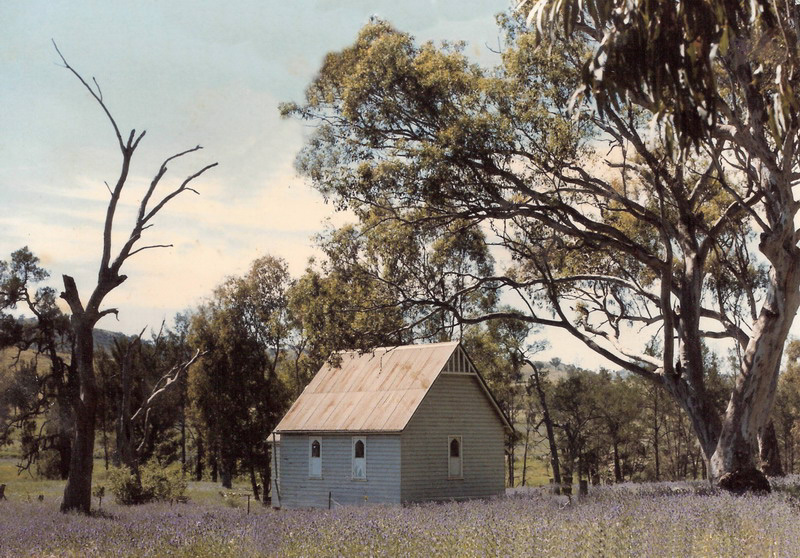
A shed in Sackville

In 1880 Robert Mathews recorded the name of the language of the peoples in Sackville as Darkiñung. This identification remains. In 1829 a word list or ‘Native names of places on the Hawkesbury’ was compiled by the Presbyterian Reverend, John McGarvie. A wordlist of Indigenous language by Hawkesbury people was recorded by James Tuckerman at Sackville.

=== Transport ===
The railway from Sydney to Windsor opened in 1864, which meant that farm produce could be shipped upriver for onward transportation by train. However, by the 1880s the river had become silted up between Sackville and Windsor, and Sackville became the head of navigation for seagoing vessels.

The SS Hawkesbury, operating from the 1880s, and the SS Narara, from 1900 until it sank in 1909, linked Sackville to Sydney by river. Later, there were two passenger steamers running daily trips; Empress and Surprise. Both boats were in high use during the fruit season. The Lady Hawkesbury was a passenger liner that was responsible for not only severing the cables of the Sackville Ferry but "pulling out the mooring posts as well."

The Sackville Ferry service is one of five vehicular ferries in the Hawkesbury. The Sackville ferry reportedly began service in the early 1870s. It was privately owned and used to transport school children and fresh produce. It operated as part of the transport process for moving produce to the Sydney Markets. The Minister of Works approved a punt to be placed at Mitchell Wharf, Sackville in July 1883.

Sackville Road is the main road leading to Sackville from Windsor and continues on the opposite side of the river at North Sackville. The main road dissects Sackville. To the East is Tizzana road which follows the river to the historical site of St Thomas Church, and then beyond to the suburb of Ebenezer. The West Portland Road runs West from Sackville Road before turning sharply North to Lilburndale Homestead and Roberts Creek.

== Heritage listings ==
There are five heritage listed sites in Sackville.

=== St. Thomas Cemetery ===
St. Thomas Cemetery sits at the Northern tip of Sackville, at the point where Tizzana road bends. This was also the location of the first Anglican church. It represents the archaeology and history of the early settlers and their descendants. The 1926 Indigenous woman, Martha Everingham,(nee Hobbs) was buried here. Martha was reportedly one of the original Hawkesbury Aborigines. A list of legible headstones was recorded in 2001. The oldest gravestone is dated 1 February 1828 marking the burial of Grace Turnbull aged 33. The Georgian headstones have significant historical value as they are rare examples of the era.

=== St Thomas' Anglican Church ===
The original church was located at the cemetery but was swept away in the 1867 flood. It is mentioned in 1905, the author writes that the Methodist church in Sackville North "disappeared bodily, like its Anglican neighbour across the river whose harmonium ultimately 'went ashore' on the beach at Manly". The Church was rebuilt further up the hill on the opposite side of Tizzana road in the 1870's. St Thomas' is an example of a Victorian Gothic church with steeply pitched roof, belfry and pointed arched openings. The church underwent extensive repairs following a fire in 1959.

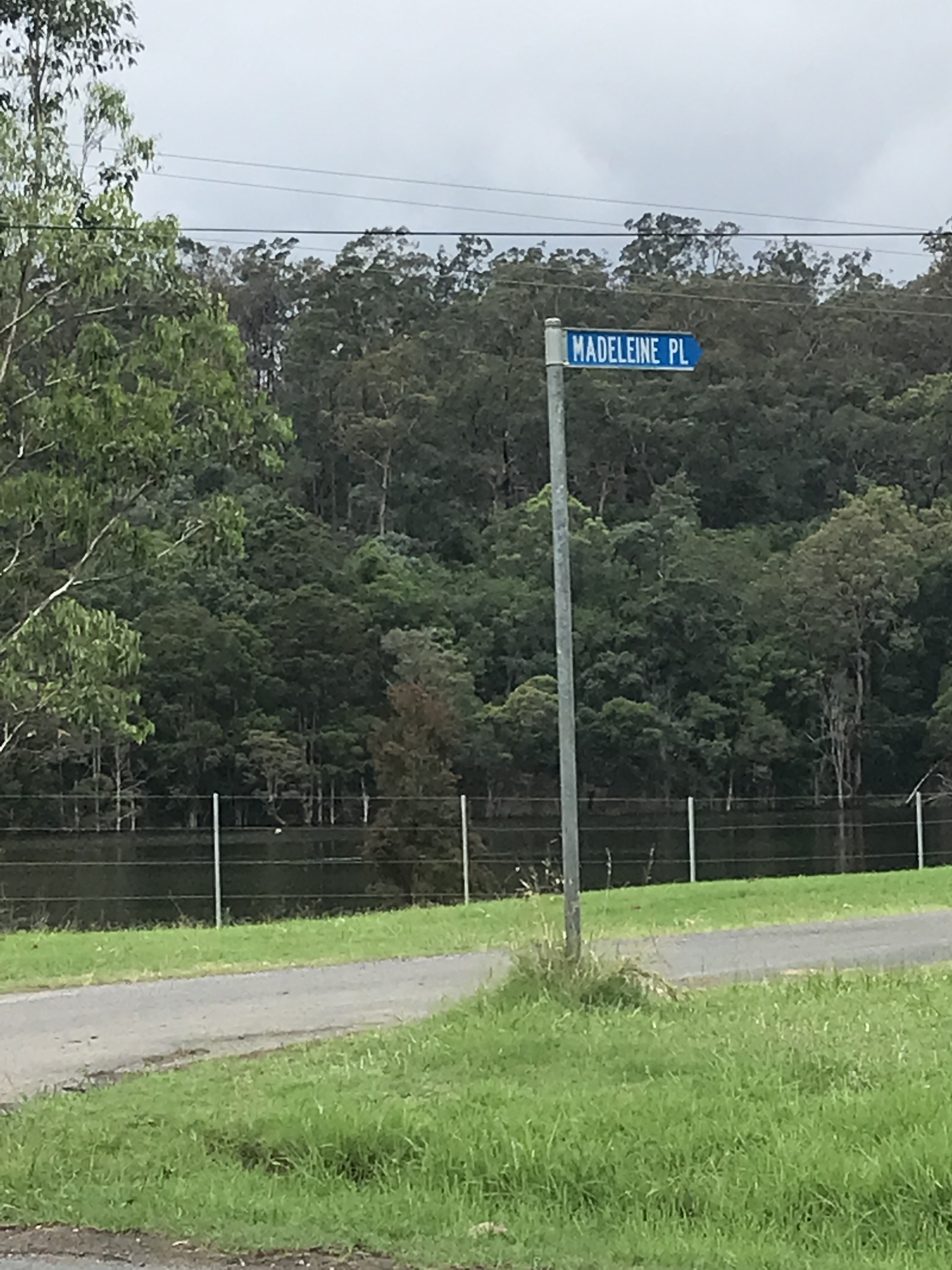
Cnr Tizzana Road and Madeleine Place, 2022.

=== Lilburndale ===
Lilburndale is located at 413 West Portland Road and marks the upper reaches of the suburb of Sackville. The house was built circa.1850 by George-Smith Hall on the property owned by his grandparents, early settlers, George and Mary-Ann Hall. George Hall senior (b.1783) also contributed to the building of Ebenezer church. He drowned in the Hawkesbury River in 1840 after slipping whilst climbing through a fence on his way home. In 2021 Lilburndale began operating as a wedding venue.

=== Residence: Tizzana Road ===
Situated on the hill above the corner of Madeleine Place, opposite the Ski Gardens at 742 Tizzana Road. There are unrecorded oral histories, requiring verification, that tell of how the house was a stop over for prisoner transportation on the river and that cells exist below the front portion of the house. Possibly dated around 1940. The house is not as old as Mr James Holmes 1885 residence, located on the hill opposite the end of Tizzana road and near Churchill's Wharf.

=== Residence and barn: Sackville Road ===
Located at 888 Sackville Road. The house represents a "very good example of a substantial Inter-war bungalow featuring contrasting brick and render work, broad gables and leadlight windows." The site also includes a tall slab barn which is characteristic of the Hawkesbury district.

== Points of interest ==
- The straight stretch of river along the Northern end of Tizzana road is popular for skiing and is home to the Sackville Ski Gardens and caravan park.
- Daragyle Ski park
- Gelignite Jack Murray water skied at Sackville, famously behind a sea plane. He had a hut at the mouth of the Western corner of Addy's Creek on property owned by Brown. He would use the boat sheds and ramp at Sackville ski gardens.
- The first female to represent Australia in the World titles in water skiing in 1953 began the sport at Sackville. Mrs Ray Leighton of Manly said her husband taught her to ski. He "learned from photographer Reg Johnson, who, with his wife Jeanie, really introduced water-ski-ing to Australia" Leighton said they started skiing at Sackville "which is the best spot but a bit far".
