= Lower Portland =

- Suburb
- Interactive map of Lower Portland
- Coordinates: 33°26′31″S 150°52′44″E
- Country: Australia
- State: New South Wales
- City: Sydney
- LGAs: City of Hawkesbury; The Hills Shire
- Location: 80 km (50 mi) northwest of Sydney CBD

Government
  - State electorate: Hawkesbury
  - Federal divisions: Macquarie; Berowra
- Elevation: 8 m (26 ft)

Population
  - Total: 711 (2021 census)
- Postcode: 2756
Suburbs around Lower Portland
Cumberland Reach	Webbs Creek	Leets Vale
Cumberland Reach	Lower Portland	Maroota
Sackville North	South Maroota	South Maroota

Lower Portland is a rural suburb near Sydney, in the state of New South Wales, Australia. Lower Portland is located 80 kilometres northwest of the Sydney central business district, in the local government areas of The Hills Shire (east of the Hawkesbury River and the City of Hawkesbury (west of the Hawkesbury River). Lower Portland is a peaceful hamlet located at the junction of the Colo and Hawkesbury rivers. The area has historical significance, is scenic and is popular for water skiing.

== History ==
The original inhabitants of the Lower Portland area were the Dharug people. The Dharug were the custodians of the majority of what is now the Greater Sydney region. They were divided into a number of different 'clans', whose quick demise upon European settlement has resulted in very little information remaining on how the local area was utilised.

The area situated on the banks of the Hawkesbury River below the junction with the Colo River was given the name Portland Place by Governor Hunter when it was first settled in 1799 by convicts who were engaged in clearing timber and building a stock yard, i.e. a paddock at Portland Place that enclosed thirty acres. The name Portland Place came from a street in the Marylebone area of London. (H.R.A. Series I Volume II p. 745)

Lower Portland was named after William Henry Cavendish Bentinck, 3rd Duke of Portland, and Prime Minister of Great Britain in 1783, and 1807–1809. The name was first used in 1805, and almost certainly seems associated with the story that a rock on the plateau above the headland resembled the Duke of Portland. Lower Portland was the area settled downstream from Portland Head.

== Transport ==
The Lower Portland Ferry is one of four vehicular ferries operating across the Hawkesbury River. The River Road is a popular scenic drive. Lower Portland Ferry operates 24hrs 7days a week. Closed 1st Wednesday of each month 9:00am–11:00am.
