= Great North Road (Mount Manning to Wollombi Section) =

Historic road in New South Wales, Australia

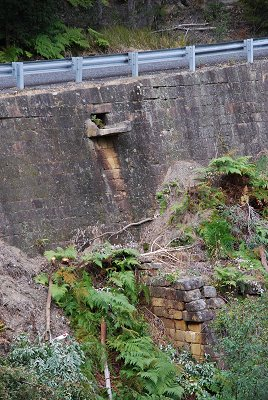
- Great North Road, Between Mt Manning and Wollombi - Old Great North Road - Ramsays Leap

- Location within New South Wales Location within Australia
- 33.0231°S 151.1321°E
- Location: Mount Manning and Wollombi, City of Hawkesbury, New South Wales, Australia

History
- Built: 1830–1832

Site notes
- Architect(s): Heneage Finch (1830–1831); L V Dulhunty (1831–1834)

New South Wales Heritage Register
- Official name: Great North Road, Between Mt Manning and Wollombi; St Albans Road Ramp; Bucketty; Mt McQuoid; Ramsays Leap; Mt Simpson; Fernances Crossing; Murrays Run; Thompsons Bridge; Laguna
- Type: state heritage (built)
- Designated: 2 June 2009
- Reference no.: 1789
- Type: Road
- Category: Transport - Land
- Builders: Convict road gangs

Great North Road (Mount Manning to Wollombi Section) is a heritage-listed road alignment, partly in use and partly abandoned, between Mount Manning and Wollombi, New South Wales, Australia. It was built between 1830 and 1832 by convict road gangs, having been surveyed by Heneage Finch (1830–1831) and thereafter by L. V. Dulhunty. It was added to the New South Wales State Heritage Register on 2 June 2009.

== History ==
Much of the section of the Great North Road north of Mt Manning was constructed under the supervision of Heneage Finch who had been the Assistant Surveyor responsible for the selection of the original line of road in 1825. in 1830, Finch replaced lt Percy Simpson as supervisor of the area north of Mt Manning up to the Hunter Valley. After a dispute, Finch was abruptly dismissed in 1831. Finch's successors were L. V. Dulhunty (1831–1834) and Peter Ogilvie (1835–1836). Finch had aimed to complete a road equal in excellence of construction to the existing section between Wisemans Ferry and Mt Manning. Similar construction techniques were used, including cut and fill methods that resulted in extensive blasting and quarrying combined with the use of massive embankments and retaining walls as well as culverts and bridges over the numerous small creeks between Mt Manning and Wollombi.

=== Major items ===
==== Quarry site & ramp on St Albans road ====
The ramp structure or embanked causeway that now forms part of the St Albans Road was probably completed by the No. 9 Iron Gang, under Percy Simpson's supervision, between May and December, 1830, as the gang is recorded as being "stationed near Mt Manning" during this period. The style and workmanship of the ramp are also similar to that of other structures completed by the same gang, such as the retaining walls south of Wisemans Ferry and on the ascent of Mt Baxter.

==== Stone culverts and bridge (abandoned section at Bucketty) ====
The great North Road in the vicinity of Mt McQuoid was constructed during 1830 and 1831 by No. 29 Road Party who also probably built former bridge here during this period.

==== Ramsays Leap - retaining wall and flume near Mt Simpson ====
Several gangs were employed during 1830–32 at Mt Simpson building the extensive descent to the valley floor. These included the No. 27 Road Party, No. 29 Road Party and No. 42 Road Party. The latter party probably built the massive curved retaining wall with its buttressing flume at Ramsays Leap. It is likely that the remainder of the descent, winding precariously along the steep contours of the mountainside, was originally supported by a continuous retaining wall of equal standard, but of which, as a result of road widening, only a fragment near the base remains.

==== Stone causeway ====
A section of earlier road, about 150m in length situated east of the modern day road alignment just north of the base of Mt. Simpson.

==== Stone culvert at Fernances Crossing and stone arched culvert & retaining wall at Murrays Run ====
The area near Mt Finch, also known as "Murray's valley" or the "back of Murray's Farm", posed a major obstacle to road construction as a swamp, several creeks and steep climbs required much arduous labour. Heneage Finch stationed No. 27 Road Party there not long after his arrival and it remained there during 1830 and 1831. No. 29 Road Party and No. 7 Iron Gang also spent short periods there. These two large stone culverts survive in this area.

==== Thompsons Bridge ====
The bridge now known as Thompsons bridge has a recent deck atop coursed rubble abutments and wing walls. It is difficult to ascertain whether it was part of the original construction of the road. If so, it may have been built by No.7 Iron Gang between July and September, 1830, although, unlike the stream, it does not appear on White's 1831 map. The stonework contrasts in size, dressing and quality with other structures in the area, suggesting that it may be a later construction. It is possible that later additions were built on the site of a pre-existing bridge, perhaps using the stones from the earlier structure. [Another interpretation suggests it may have been a culvert (like those at Murrays Run and Fernances Crossing) that collapsed at some stage and was replaced with a bridge that decreased the bend. At this stage part of the wall was rebuilt on a different alignment. There is a distinct bend in the stonework that changes quality at the bend, that closest to the bridge being of lesser quality. At the edge of the bitumen leading to where a culvert would have been can be seen original knapped stone paving].

==== Abandoned loops at Laguna Shop and Milsons Arm ====
The road through the valley here was mainly constructed by No. 7 Iron Gang and No. 42 Road Party during 1830, and completed in 1832 by Nos. 27 and 42 Road Parties.

== Description ==
This section of the Great North Road begins at its junction with the road from St Albans. The northern limit of this listing is the southern abutment of Cleghorns Bridge over Wollombi Brook. The road surface is unsealed for 5 km. After its intersection with George Downes Drive at the Bucketty junction, the road is sealed. This 30 km section of the road retains several individually valuable and unique structures. It passes and links surviving historic and archaeological sites and early depots, rural homesteads and land grants.

Several structures have been isolated by road realignments. This has assisted their potential long term preservation. Community groups have carried out repairs to some structures. The Convict Trail project has placed interpretive signs and plaques at several locations.

=== Major items ===
==== Descent of Mt Manning ====
The descent was a major work where the hillside was cut down to form part of the road surface, the remainder being constructed on fill behind retaining walls. These walls are now mostly hidden under overfill, but the cuttings and side drains and one large culvert still exist. At the top is a small quarry site and most of the rock cutting along the road side is pick dressed.

==== Quarry site & ramp on St Albans Road ====
The ramp or embanked causeway on the St Albans Road is formed by two battered (sloped) masonry retaining walls which support each side of the roadway where it traverses a deep hollow. The retaining walls for the ramp are approximately 9 metres apart and reach a maximum height of 3.5 to 4 metres at the centre. The walls are constructed of fairly regular, squared stone blocks. The masonry is dry-laid with a well prepared bed (horizontal) joints, a plain worked face and roughly prepared perpends (vertical joints). Course heights are generally in the vicinity of 250 to 300 mm with stone lengths generally in the range of 250 to 400 mm.; the top course ranged from 75mm to 300m. The southeast wall extends approximately 65 m. The wall increases in height until it reaches its maximum of 12 courses in the centre. The northwest wall is approximately 44 m long with a maximum height of 14 courses. There is a quarry site on the hill southwest of the ramp structure.

==== Road from St Albans Road Ramp to Bucketty ====
Much of this road still lies on the original road surface with original cuttings and drains (damaged by modern road maintenance) Under the current road surface is the original surface cut into the bedrock in parts filled with knapped stone.

==== Stone culverts and bridge (abandoned section at Bucketty) ====
The abandoned loop at Mt. McQuoid/Bucketty comprises a section about 400 metres long which was cut off by the reconstruction of the nearby intersection immediately east of the earlier alignment. This short section includes a diverse range of features which illustrate the nature of the road construction utilised on the Great North Road. At the southern end is a stone culvert flanked by the remains of wing walls. The culvert was reconstructed in 2003. Immediately north of the culvert is a macadam type pavement of compacted broken stone about 7m wide. About 75m north of the wing-wall culvert is an extensive ashlar masonry retaining wall. The wall curves to cross a gully where a former bridge was located. The span of the bridge has now been infilled with a large diameter concrete pipe surrounded by cement mortared stone blocks probably deriving from nearby structures such as the wing-walled culvert. North of the former bridge the road alignment rises up to a rock cutting with the road pavement cut into the bedrock, and an associated rock-cut side drain. This then changes to a macadam type pavement. There is also a well preserved sandstone masonry box-culvert within this northern pavement/road section of the Mt. McQuoid precinct.

==== From Bucketty Private Road number 3 to the ascent of Mt Simpson ====
Here the current road lies on the same line as the original road, in part cut below the original road leaving evidence of the original road and drain in the side cutting. In other parts the bitumen had been laid on the original road surface and evidence of the original road can be seen in the cuttings; the drains and at the edges of bitumen.

==== Ramsays Leap - retaining wall and flume near Mt Simpson ====
The Ramsays Leap curved retaining wall is a major structure built into a steep gully which slopes away to the west. The wall is curved and battered (sloped) and is about 100 metres long and up to 4.5 metres high. The batter is 1 horizontal to 4 vertical. The masonry is ashlar work, dry laid, and generally in sound condition with well prepared stones and tight joints. The coursing is consistently level. A square culvert is set in the centre of the curve, three courses below the top of the wall and running perpendicular to the road. The inlet has a drop entry with an inclined, rounded race. At the outlet a shaped slab sill projects from the wall throwing water about 3m down onto a short horizontal race and thence to a final spillway approximately 3.5m from the toe of the wall. The spillway is about 4m high and has a batter of 1:4. On the uphill side, there is a continuous cutting beside the road with jumper marks, carved initials, bench marks, and other historic features. Part of the earlier work has been removed by subsequent widening activities. There is also a small "well" or drinking trough about 30 cm wide and 20 cm deep. This may be a "convict drinking well" (as reputed) or may relate to a later period in the use of the road. The road remains in use here with a sealed bitumen/aggregate pavement.

==== Stone causeway ====
A section of earlier road, about 150m in length situated east of the modern day road alignment just north of the base of Mt. Simpson. About 75m of the earlier alignment is paved with a hand-knapped, closely packed stones forming a pavement surface. Stones are of various shapes and sizes, the largest about 20 cm across. In the central part of the paved section, the stones are broken up into smaller pieces, possibly caused by weathering and erosion from water flow in peak periods. At the southern end, where there is also a side cutting, the hand-placed pavement is substantially intact. The road is built up above the surrounding flat to a height of approximately 60 cm and the formation is approximately 3m wide.

==== Stone culvert at Fernances Crossing ====
A curved stone retaining wall with a central rectangular culvert was constructed to carry the road formation across a small east facing gully. The retaining wall to the embankment is 3m high at the highest point. It is battered at a slope of 1:7. The stone blocks are laid random with broken courses, some snecking and an uneven arrangement of perpends. The stones have rough, uneven margins. Course heights range from 20 to 75 cm with blocks up to 100 cm in length and 80 cm in depth. The lintel at the outlet is carved into a semi-circle, which extends for only half the depth of an otherwise typical rectangular slab lintel. This detailing is decorative, not functional. The inlet end of the culvert has been modified by placement of a modern concrete drop-inlet/gully pit. Apart from the wall and culvert, the Fernances Crossing precinct includes some other interesting elements. These include evidence of older quarrying in the rock cutting south of the wall and also near the modern gully pit inlet as well as some sections of older crushed sandstone road pavement visible in the area above the wall.

==== Stone arched culvert & retaining wall at Murrays Run ====
A curved stone retaining wall with a central culvert was constructed to carry the road formation across a small east facing gully. The retaining wall to the embankment is 10 courses/4m high at the highest point. The stone blocks are laid random with irregular, uneven courses, and some snecking. The culvert is rectangular in cross-section with sides 2 courses high and cover slabs spanning the full width of the internal channel. At the outlet an arch of shaped voussoir stones supports the retaining wall above. This detailing is extremely elaborate and decorative, no other examples are known. The inlet end of the culvert has been modified by placement of a modern concrete drop-inlet/gully pit.

==== Thompsons Bridge (stone, still in use) ====
This timber bridge incorporates stone abutments of rough rubble walling on the downhill side. The two-span timber trestle structure between the abutments is recent. It has recent round longitudinal stringers and planked decking. The stone walls on each side are coursed rubble work uncharacteristic of the other work in this area but similar to more modest work south of Mt. Manning. Coursing is uneven and unlevel. A batter is achieved recessing each course back by approximately 5 cm. The northern abutment curves with the alignment of the road around the corner.

==== Abandoned loop at Laguna shop ====
An unsealed section of earlier road, about 250m in length situated west of the modern day sealed road alignment. Few construction features are evident. The older alignment appears to pass below a recently erected community "hall" structure then re-emerges passing in front of the general store/wine bar, before rejoining the current road-line.

==== Abandoned loop near Milsons Arm Road ====
An unsealed section of earlier road, about 250m in length situated east and west of the present sealed road alignment in the area north and south of the Milsons Arm Road intersection. Construction features evident in the southernmost loop, include small areas of side cutting and remnant timber guard posts, which indicate the older road formation was at a lower level beside the Wollombi Brook. The northern loop (west of the current road) provides access to the "Potter's Gallery" property, where there is evidence of old quarrying on a large sandstone outcrop beside the older road formation.

=== Condition ===
As at 28 December 2007, the majority of this section of the Great North Road is intact with instances of localised distortion due to tree growth and erosion. At the St Albans Ramp there has been some theft of sandstone blocks.

== Heritage listing ==
The Great North Road is an item of national heritage significance. It meets all State Heritage Register criteria and does so at a number of levels. Historically, the Great North Road is of state significance as the first made road north of the Hawkesbury. It was constructed by convict gangs between 1826 and 1836. The road has historic associations with several notable colonial figures including Governor Darling and Surveyor-General Thomas Mitchell. The Great North Road is also evidence of the development of the colony at Sydney and of the policies during this period of using convict gangs to construct major public works.

The Great North Road constitutes a material record of convict labour. Many surviving structures and precincts bespeak the quality of work achieved by convict artisans. Some precincts of the road remain in relatively unspoilt areas, evocative of the frontier environment of the 1830s. Other sections remain in use as a transport corridor and have thus carried European traffic continuously since the 1830s.

The section of the Great north Road between Mount Manning and Wollombi contains a variety of features that provide tangible physical evidence of convict road engineering and construction. The section also contains a number of individually significant structures, including unique examples of culvert and flume construction as well as cuttings, side drains and pavements. Parts of this section of the road remain in use. It presents excellent interpretive opportunities.

Great North Road, between Mount Manning and Wollombi was listed on the New South Wales State Heritage Register on 2 June 2009 having satisfied the following criteria.

The place is important in demonstrating the course, or pattern, of cultural or natural history in New South Wales.

Historically, the Great North Road is of state significance as the first made road north of the Hawkesbury. It was constructed by convict gangs between 1826 and 1836. The Old Great North Road is also evidence of the development of the colony at Sydney and of the policies during this period of using convict gangs to construct major public works.

The place has a strong or special association with a person, or group of persons, of importance of cultural or natural history of New South Wales's history.

The road has historic associations with several notable colonial figures including Governor Darling and Surveyor-General Thomas Mitchell.

The place is important in demonstrating aesthetic characteristics and/or a high degree of creative or technical achievement in New South Wales.

The Great North Road constitutes a material record of convict labour. Many surviving structures and precincts bespeak the quality of work achieved by convict artisans. Some precincts of the road remain in relatively unspoilt areas, evocative of the frontier environment of the 1830s.The section of the Old Great North Road between Mount Manning and Wollombi contains a variety of features that provide tangible physical evidence of convict road engineering and construction. The section also contains a number of individually significant structures, including unique examples of culvert and flume construction as well as cuttings side drains and pavements.

The place has strong or special association with a particular community or cultural group in New South Wales for social, cultural or spiritual reasons.

The Great North Road constitutes a material record of convict labour. The road generally and its individual items in particular are held in high esteem by members of the communities through which it passes. Additionally, a community group, the Convict Trail Project, has been instrumental in researching, promoting, conserving, interpreting and monitoring the condition of the road, its items and its associated workings.

The place has potential to yield information that will contribute to an understanding of the cultural or natural history of New South Wales.

Further study of the Great North Road and its associated workings has the potential to reveal further information about the structure itself and about the lives and circumstances of the convicts builders, their supervisors and the explorers and surveyors of the period. The section of road between Mt Manning and Wollombi, because of its numerous individual items is likely to be particularly rich in evidence of this kind.

The place possesses uncommon, rare or endangered aspects of the cultural or natural history of New South Wales.

The Great North Road, as a whole, represents a unique engineering achievement, including, for example the oldest known stone bridges on the Australian mainland. The section between Mt Manning and Wollombi comprises many individual elements with unique properties of design and workmanship.

The place is important in demonstrating the principal characteristics of a class of cultural or natural places/environments in New South Wales.

The Great North Road is representative of public works built using convict labour. The section between Mt Manning and Wollombi particularly represents the high degree of technical and aesthetic achievement that characterise such works.

== See also ==
- Media related to Great North Road at Wikimedia Commons
- Great North Road (New South Wales)
- Old Great North Road (Devine's Hill to Mount Manning Section)
