= GNR =

GNR may refer to:

== Military and paramilitary ==
- Gunner (rank)
- National Republican Guard (Italy) (Italian: Guardia Nazionale Repubblicana), active during World War II
- National Republican Guard (Portugal) (Portuguese: Guarda Nacional Republicana)

== Music ==
- GNR (band), a Portuguese rock band
- Guns N' Roses, an American hard rock band

== Transport ==
- Dr. Arturo Umberto Illia Airport, serving General Roca, Río Negro, Argentina
- Gambia International Airlines
- Great North Road (disambiguation)
- Great Northern Railway (disambiguation)
  - Great Northern Railway of Canada
  - Great Northern Railway (Great Britain)
  - Great Northern Railway (Ireland)
  - Great Northern Railway (Queensland) in Australia
  - Great Northern Railway (U.S.), now part of the BNSF Railway system
- Green Road railway station, in England

== Other uses ==
- Galaxy News Radio, a fictional radio station in Fallout 3
- Great North Radio, a radio station in North East England
- Graphene nanoribbon
- Great North Run, a half marathon in north-east England
