= Old Great North Road (Devine's Hill to Mount Manning Section) =

Historic road in New South Wales, Australia

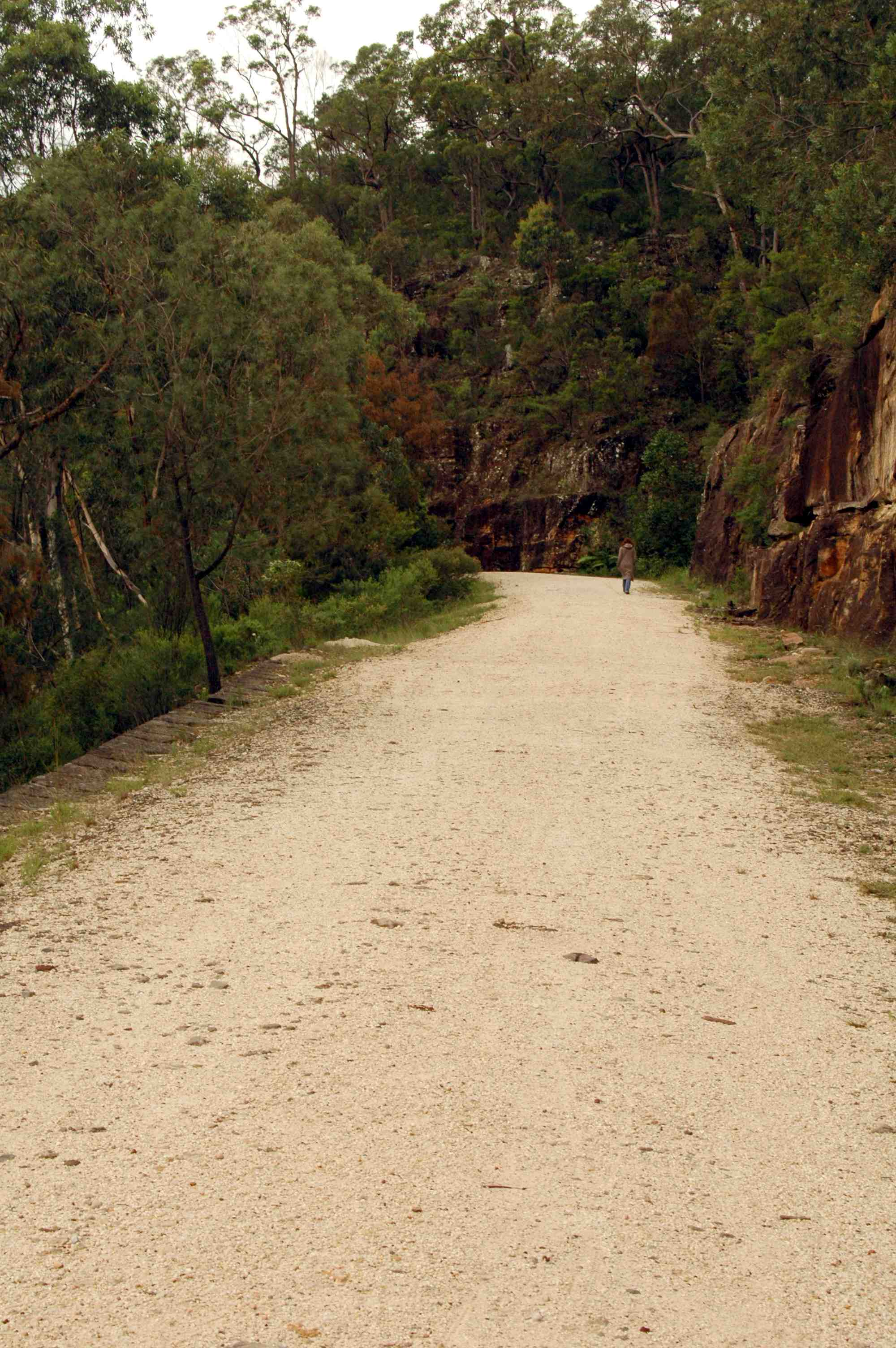
- Devine's Hill, just past the Thomas James Bridge; at the foot of the hill, vehicular traffic joins a newer road, leaving the Great North Road to walkers and cyclists.

- Location within New South Wales Location within Australia
- 33.3661°S 150.9874°E
- Location: Between Wisemans Ferry and Mount Manning, New South Wales, Australia

History
- Built: 1826–1834

Site notes
- Architect: Thomas Mitchell (surveyor general)
- Owner: Office of Environment and Heritage

New South Wales Heritage Register
- Official name: Old Great North Road, Between Devine's Hill and Mount Manning; Section 3 (in CMP)
- Type: state heritage (complex / group)
- Designated: 2 April 1999
- Reference no.: 991
- Type: Road
- Category: Transport – Land
- Builders: convict road gangs

Old Great North Road (Devine's Hill to Mount Manning Section) is a heritage-listed section of former main road, now walking track and service road, between Wisemans Ferry and Mount Manning, New South Wales, Australia. It was designed by Surveyor-General Thomas Mitchell and built from 1826 to 1834 by convict road gangs. It was added to the New South Wales State Heritage Register on 2 April 1999.

== History ==
The Great North Road, over 240 km long, was constructed between 1826 and 1834, and remains one of the major engineering feats of the convict era. Much of the road is still in use today, although some of the original surface is buried. A number of the original stone culverts, bridges and retaining walls are still in use. The road runs from the Windsor Road in Baulkham Hills to Wiseman's Ferry, and then continues further North to Wollombi where it branches off to Maitland and Singleton. At the time of construction the engineering was at the cutting edge of road building technology, incorporating the latest ideas from Europe.

Work on the road began in 1826 after petitions from residents in the newly settled Hunter Valley for a decent route to take stock and travellers north. Construction proceeded under the direction of Thomas Mitchell, the Surveyor General and by Governor Darling who had recognised the need for infrastructure in the rapidly expanding colony. Construction was carried out by convicts working in Road Gangs. Up to 700 men worked on the road at any one time, suffering harsh conditions.

Construction was completed by 1833. Many travellers, however, found sections of the road too isolated with insufficient water and feed for stock. As a result, alternative tracks were quickly searched out along the fertile Hawkesbury and Macdonald valleys, providing a safer and faster alternative for travellers. Sections of the Great Road soon fell into disrepair.

== Description ==
The Great North Road runs from the Windsor Road in Baulkham Hills to Wiseman's Ferry, and then further North to Wollombi where it branches off to Maitland and Singleton. It is over 240 km long. A shorter section was built in 1830 between Five Dock and Pennant Hills, joining the original road at Dural. Another major branch line, Simpson's Track, divergerd from the main road at Ten Mile Hollow, and crossed Mangrove Creek, heading through Yarramalong towards Newcastle.

There are still some places where well-preserved sections of the original Road can be seen. The 43 km section immediately north of Wiseman's Ferry, from Devine's Hill to Mount Manning run through very steep and rugged country and contains particularly fine examples of high walling with massive buttresses, drainage systems and quarries. The walls, up to 13m high, are made of interlocking stone blocks of varying shapes and sizes without mortar to hold them together. Some of the blocks weigh up to 660 kg. Examples of stone work at Clares Bridge and Circuit Flat Bridge are preserved within Dharug and Yengo National Parks. These areas are closed to vehicular access to preserve the remaining convict road works. Other sections of convict work can be seen at Mt McQuoid, Ramseys Leap and the Murrays Run Culvert.

== Heritage listing ==
The Old Great North Road is a signifier of the outlooks of early colonial society. Its magnificent structures were powerful, tangible symbols of the colony's perceived place and role in the course of empire, unmistakable evidence that the civilised state was being attained and a triumph over a rugged and inhospitable landscape. It is associated with several notable figures in colonial administration, surveying and engineering including Governor Darling, Surveyor General Thomas Mitchell and Percy Simpson, one of Australia's earliest scientific road engineers.

The Old Great North Road physically demonstrates the work patterns, skills and organisation of convict work gangs. This evidence is unavailable in documentary sources and has been essential in changing our views of work gangs. It has technological value in that it demonstrates the standards and practice of road engineering in the colony during the "Great Roads" period of the late 1820s and 1830s.

Old Great North Road, Between Devine's Hill and Mount Manning was listed on the New South Wales State Heritage Register on 2 April 1999 having satisfied the following criteria.

The place is important in demonstrating the course, or pattern, of cultural or natural history in New South Wales.

The Great North Road is a signifier of the outlooks of early colonial society. Its magnificent structures were powerful, tangible symbols of the colony's perceived place and role in the course of empire and unmistakable evidence that the civilised state was being attained. It was a triumph over a rugged and inhospitable landscape. It is associated with several notable figures in colonial administration, surveying and engineering. These include, Governor Darling, Surveyor General Thomas Mitchell and Percy Simpson, one of Australia's earliest scientific road engineers.

The place has potential to yield information that will contribute to an understanding of the cultural or natural history of New South Wales.

The Great North Road physically demonstrates the work patterns, skills and organisation of convict work gangs. This evidence is unavailable in documentary sources and has been essential in changing our views of work gangs. It has technological value in that it demonstrates the standards and practice of road engineering in the colony during the "Great Roads" period of the late 1820s and 1830s

== See also ==
- Media related to Great North Road at Wikimedia Commons
- Great North Road (New South Wales)
- Great North Road (Mount Manning to Wollombi Section)
