= Great North Road =

Great North Road may refer to:

== Roads ==
- Great North Road (Great Britain), a historical coaching route partly used by the A1 road in the United Kingdom
- Great North Road (Ancestral Puebloans), a road used by the Ancestral Puebloans of the American Southwest, part of the Chacoan road system
- Great North Road, Gibraltar, a lorry sized tunnel
- Great North Road (New South Wales), a historical road in Australia leading from Sydney to the Hunter Valley
  - Great North Road (Mount Manning to Wollombi Section)
- Great North Road, Auckland, a road in Auckland
- Great North Road, Zambia, a road running north from Lusaka
- Great North Road (Ontario), a 19th-century road from Parry Sound to Nipissing, see Magnetawan
- Cape to Cairo Road, an historically planned route through Africa
- Cariboo Road, an historical route in British Columbia, Canada
- New Zealand State Highway 1, a road near Kamo in New Zealand

== Other ==
- Great North Road (book), a science fiction novel by Peter F Hamilton, 2012

== See also ==
- North Road (disambiguation)
