= Heneage Finch (surveyor) =

Heneage Finch (1793–1850) was a 19th-century surveyor. He is known for his surveying work in the Colony of New South Wales, Australia.

== Life ==
Heneage born on 20 September 1793 in Surrey, England. He was the second son of Vice Admiral William Clement Finch (1758-1794) and Mary Brouncker. In 1815, he completed his studies in Mathematics at Christ Church, Oxford.

He married Elizabeth Foster on 9 January 1818 at Islington, England. He left Gravesend on 2 October 1824 on the Grenada, with his wife, and they arrived in Sydney on 23 January 1825. Finch started in the Survey Office on 2 February 1825.

He was granted 1,000 acres (405 ha) along the Great North Road, which he named "Laguna".

Heneage died on 19 September 1850 at Hoxton Park, New South Wales from injuries after being gored by a bull.

Mount Finch (elevation 365m) and Finch County in New South Wales are named after him.
