= North Road =

North Road may refer to:

- North Road (Glossop), a cricket and former football ground in Glossop, England
- North Road (Manchester), a former football ground in Manchester, England
- North Road railway station, a railway station in Darlington, England
- North Road railway station, the original name of Ormond railway station in Melbourne, Australia
- Route du Nord, a road in Canada
- Bicycle handlebar#Upright or North Road
- A nickname for the northern portion of the Kenai Spur Highway between Kenai and Nikiski, Alaska
- Circuito Norte, a road in Cuba
- The North Road Company, a media production and distribution company

== See also ==
- Great North Road (disambiguation)
- Old North Road, another name for Ermine Street, a major Roman Road in the United Kingdom
- Old North Road railway station, a former station in Cambridgeshire, United Kingdom
- Plymouth North Road railway station, the original name of the present Plymouth railway station in Plymouth, United Kingdom
