= Great North Road (New South Wales) =

Historic road in New South Wales, Australia

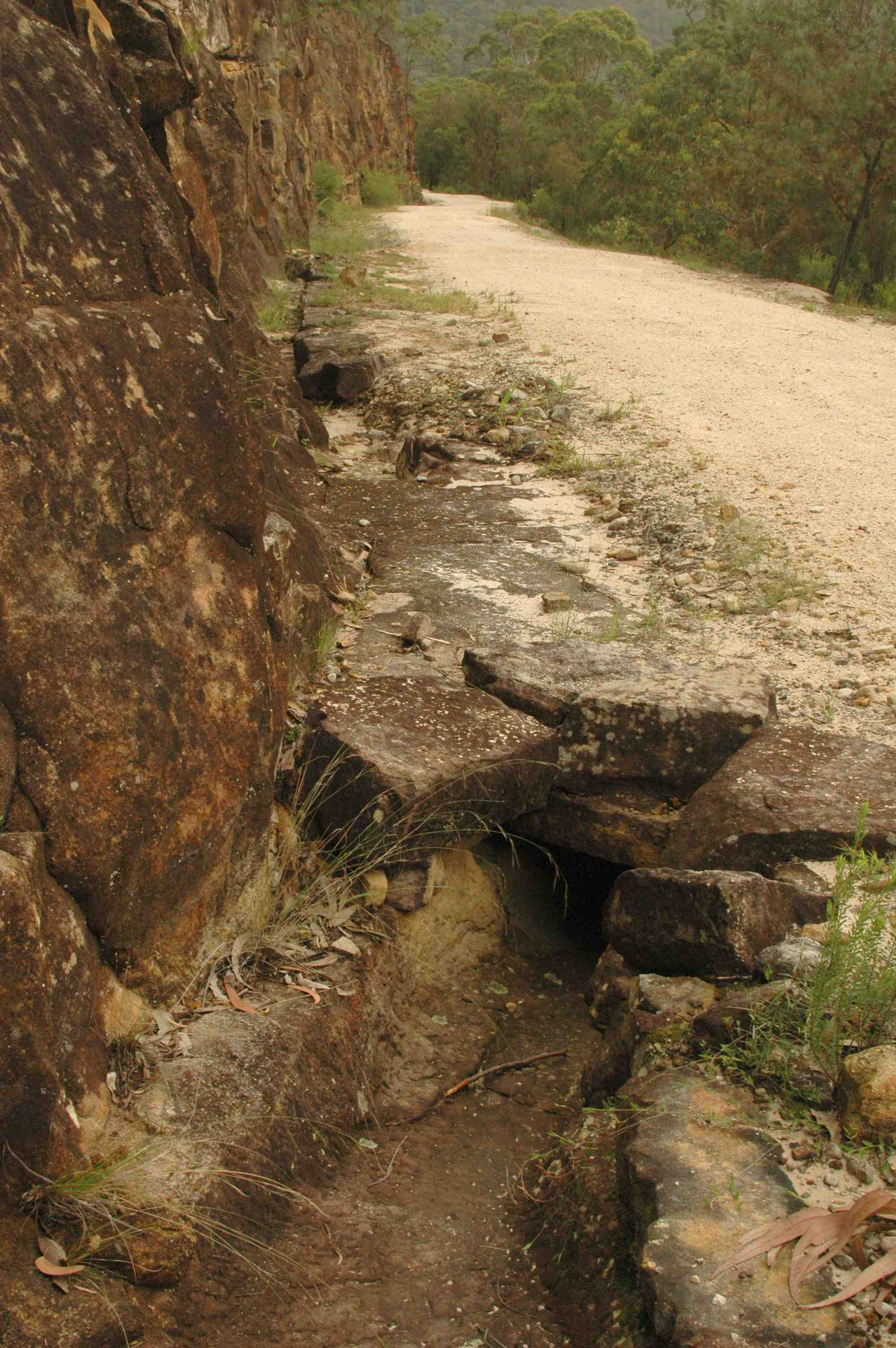
- Section of Great North including gutter hewn from solid rock leading to culvert for box drain beneath road surface.
- Interactive map of Great North Road
- Type: Historic road
- Location: New South Wales, Australia
- Coordinates: 33°22′42″S 150°59′40″E
- Area: 393.72 hectares (972.9 acres)
- Status: Australian National Heritage List; UNESCO World Heritage List
- Website: www.convicttrail.org

UNESCO World Heritage Site
- Type: Cultural
- Criteria: iv, vi
- Designated: 2010 (34th session)
- Part of: Australian Convict Sites
- Reference no.: 1306
- Region: Asia–Pacific

The Great North Road is a historic road that was built to link early Sydney, in the Colony of New South Wales, now Australia, with the fertile Hunter Valley to the north. Built by convicts between 1825 and 1836, it traverses over 260 kilometres (162 mi) of the rugged terrain that hindered early agricultural expansion.

The road is of such cultural significance it was included on the Australian National Heritage List on 1 August 2007 as a nationally significant example of major public infrastructure developed using convict labour and on the UNESCO World Heritage list as amongst:

" .. the best surviving examples of large-scale convict transportation and the colonial expansion of European powers through the presence and labour of convicts."

The road was an engineering triumph, with some sections constructed to a notably high standard. It was not an unqualified success in practical terms. Apart from the steep grades, there was a lack of water and horse feed along the route. For these reasons it quickly fell into disuse with the development of alternative means of getting to the Hunter Valley, such as steamships and newer roads. Much of the road fell into total disuse while other parts were absorbed into the urban and rural road network.

== The route ==
The Great North Road commences at Parramatta Road, at what is now the Sydney suburb of Five Dock. Historically, it crossed the Parramatta River by boat at Abbotsford, after which passed through Ryde and Dural before reaching the Hawkesbury River at Wisemans Ferry, 100 km (62 mi) to the north. It then winds through isolated and often rugged bushland along the edge of Dharug National Park, continuing through Bucketty until forking at Wollombi. From there one branch continues to Warkworth via Broke and the other goes to Cessnock, Maitland and on to Newcastle.

== The Great North Road today ==
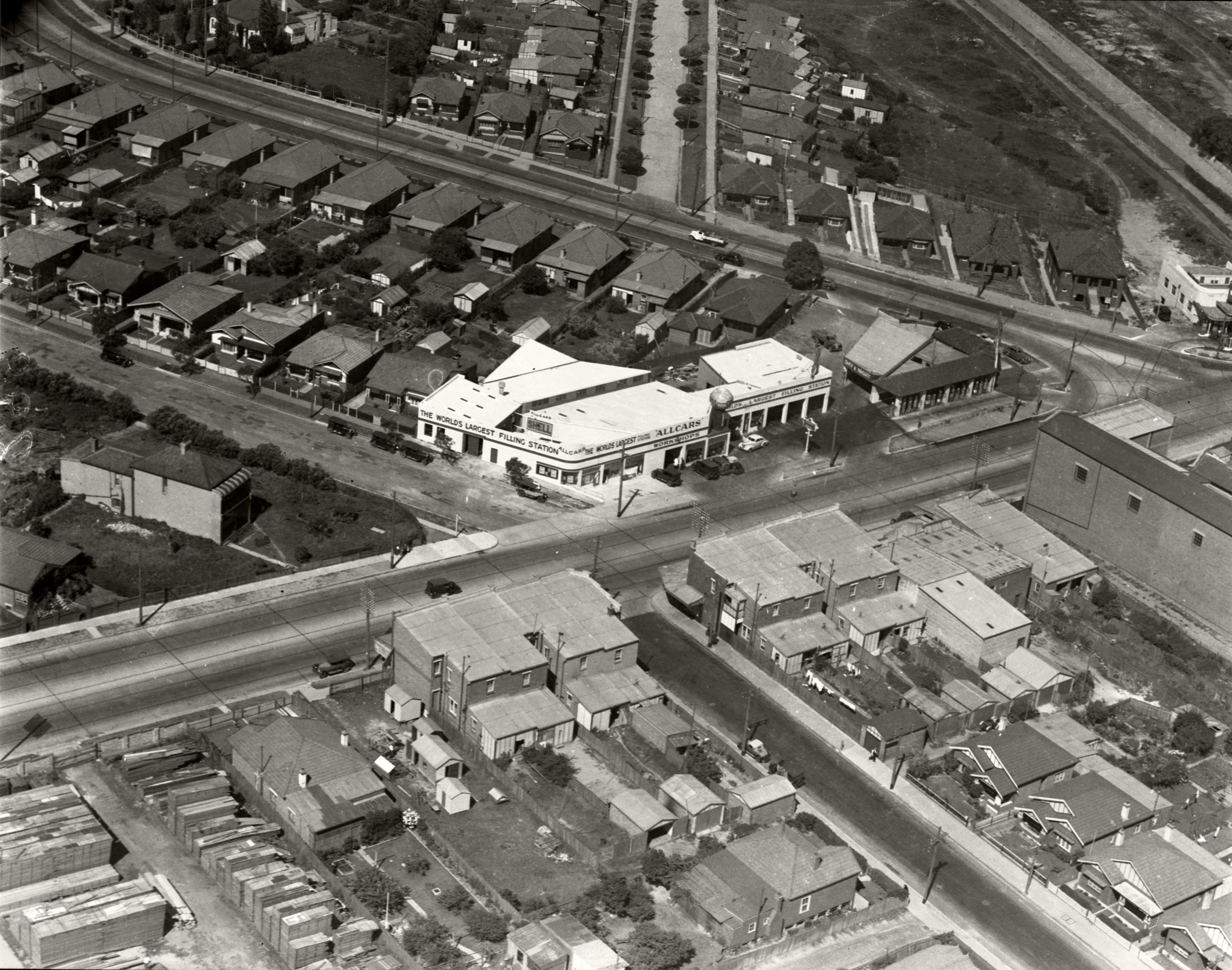
The southern end of the Great North Road, at Parramatta Road in Five Dock, photographed in the 1930s.

The Great North Road survives to this day, but different parts are preserved in very different ways. Much of it is under bitumen and concrete, either as suburban streets or rural backroads, while some is preserved in national parks and protected from vehicular traffic.

Slight evidence of its past, such as bypassed bridgeworks or even convict rock carvings, survives within the Sydney metropolitan area; by contrast large stretches remain in original condition north of the Hawkesbury River.

The first few kilometres, from Parramatta Road at Five Dock to the Parramatta River at Abbotsford, pass through the largely residential suburb of Wareemba. The historic name is retained for this section which ends at Abbotsford ferry wharf, there being no longer a corresponding wharf on the north bank.

On the opposite bank of the Parramatta River, the former alignment of the Great North Road leading from the former ferry wharf is now called Punt Road, in Gladesville. Punt Road ends at Victoria Road. The former alignment is picked up again just northwest of Top Ryde City shopping centre, as North Road, in Ryde, leading to Blaxland Road in Eastwood.

The road then recommences at the Baulkham Hills intersection with Windsor Road. Known as Old Northern Road, and Tourist Drive 15, it winds up past the suburbs of Castle Hill, Glenhaven, Dural, before continuing north as a two-lane undivided road. Old Northern Road terminates at Wiseman's Ferry. At Bucketty, it is once again renamed the Great North Road.

Two sections of the original route: the Devine's Hill (Wisemans Ferry) to Mount Manning section and the Mount Manning to Wollombi section are listed on the New South Wales Heritage Register.

== Preservation ==
In 1990, the local communities of Bucketty and Wollombi established the 'Convict Trail Project', aiming to restore, maintain and promote the road as a museum of convict engineering. Original sections of the road which are on view have provided valuable insight into early road construction techniques in the colony of New South Wales, and how English road-building technology of the time was imported and adapted. Prisoners from facilities managed by Corrective Services NSW have been involved with maintenance.

== World Heritage list ==
In July 2010, at the 34th session of the UNESCO World Heritage Committee, the Great North Road and ten other Australian sites with a significant association with convict transportation were inscribed as a group on the World Heritage List as the Australian Convict Sites. The listing explains that the 11 sites present "the best surviving examples of large-scale convict transportation and the colonial expansion of European powers through the presence and labour of convicts". Of the 11 sites the Hyde Park Barracks, Cockatoo Island, Old Government House at Parramatta are also within the Sydney region.

As part of the works to bring about public engagement with the UNESCO World Heritage Listed 'Old Great North Road' that is managed by the NSW National Parks & Wildlife Service, a living history theatre production was commissioned to tell some of the stories in-situ on Devine's Hill in Dharug National Park, Wiseman's Ferry, along the living remnants of The Road itself. 'Convict Footprints on the Old Great North Road' is a heart-touching, at times funny, at times deeply sad journey with the men and women that built The Road along the very cobbles they themselves walked.

== Engineering heritage award ==
The road is listed as a National Engineering Landmark by Engineers Australia as part of its Engineering Heritage Recognition Program.

== Gallery ==
Great North Road

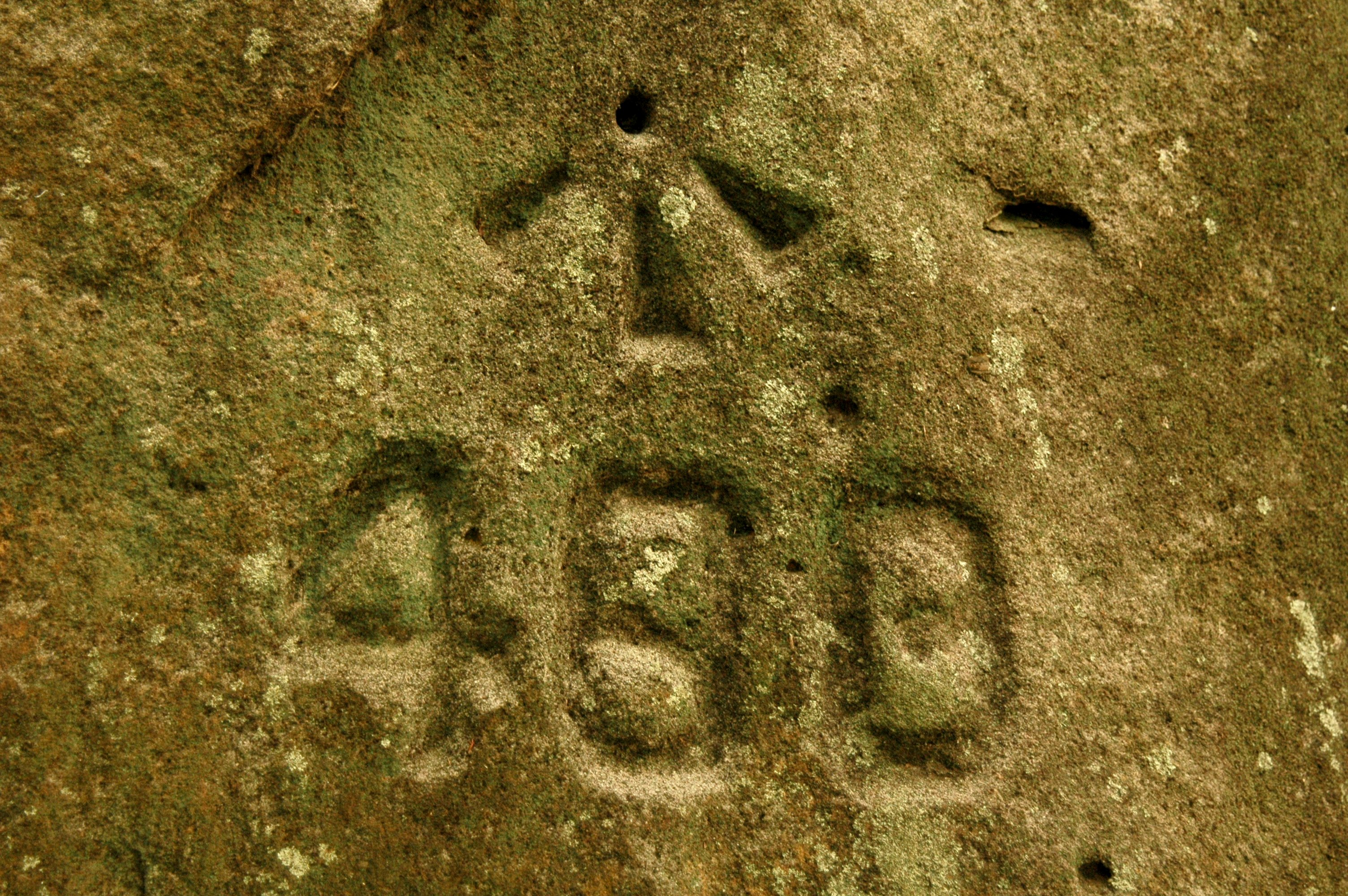
Benchmark on the route of the Great North Road

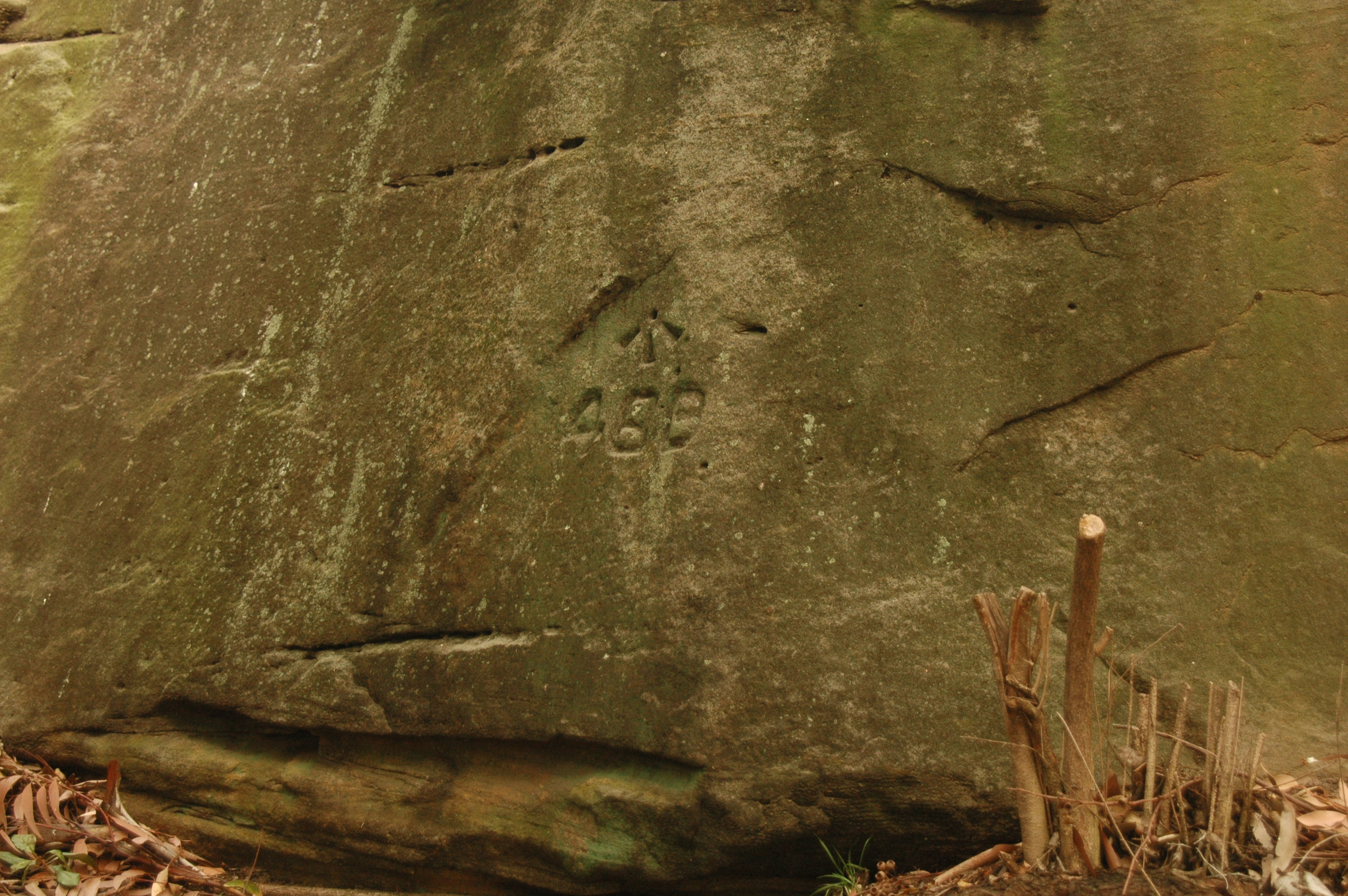
Rock carving created by convict work gang, probably around 1829; it is only a short distance from the beginning of the Great North Road at Parramatta Road

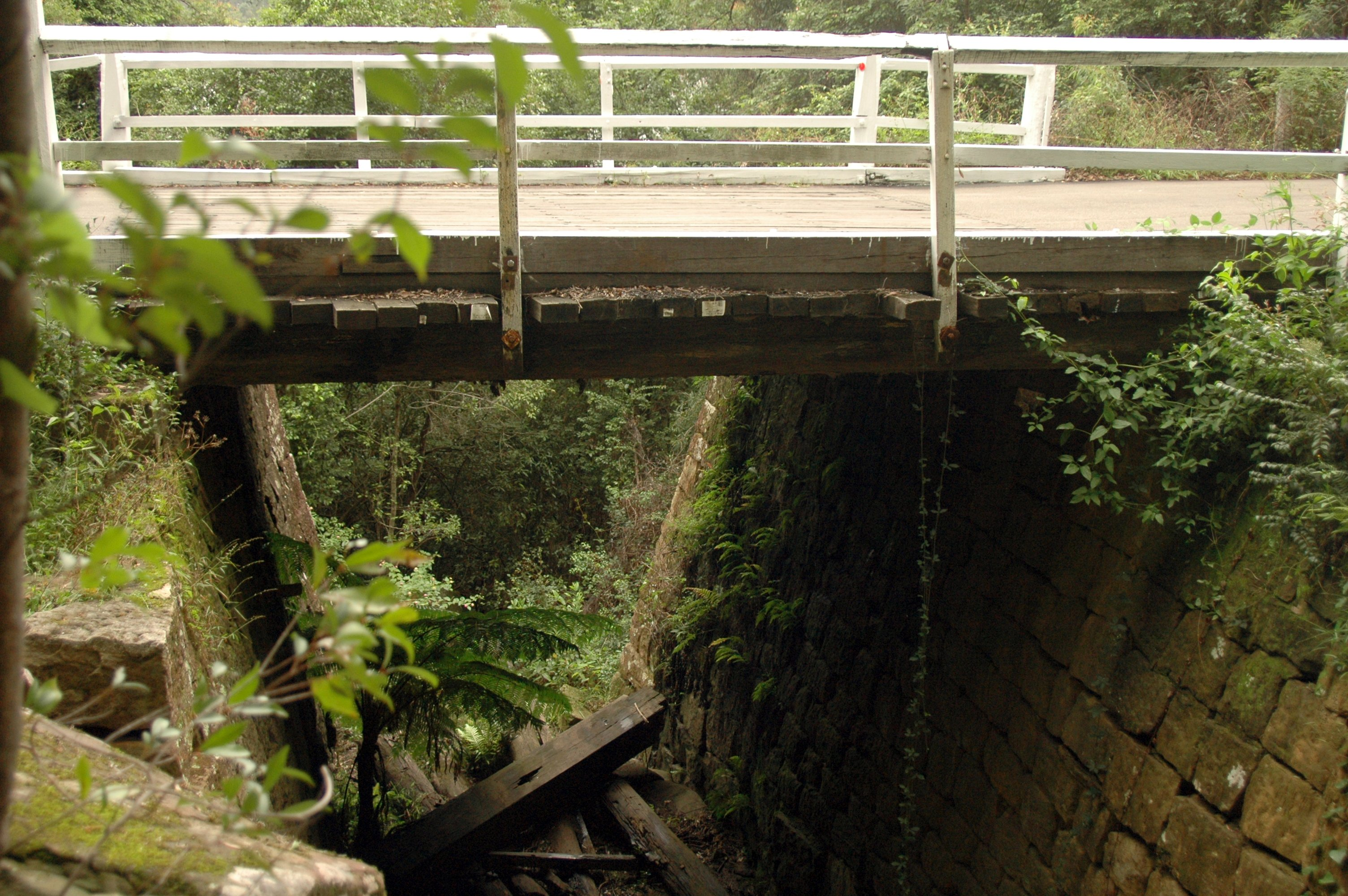
Thomas James Bridge, on the northern bank of the Hawkesbury River at Wisemans Ferry, the oldest bridge on the Australian mainland still to carry vehicular traffic

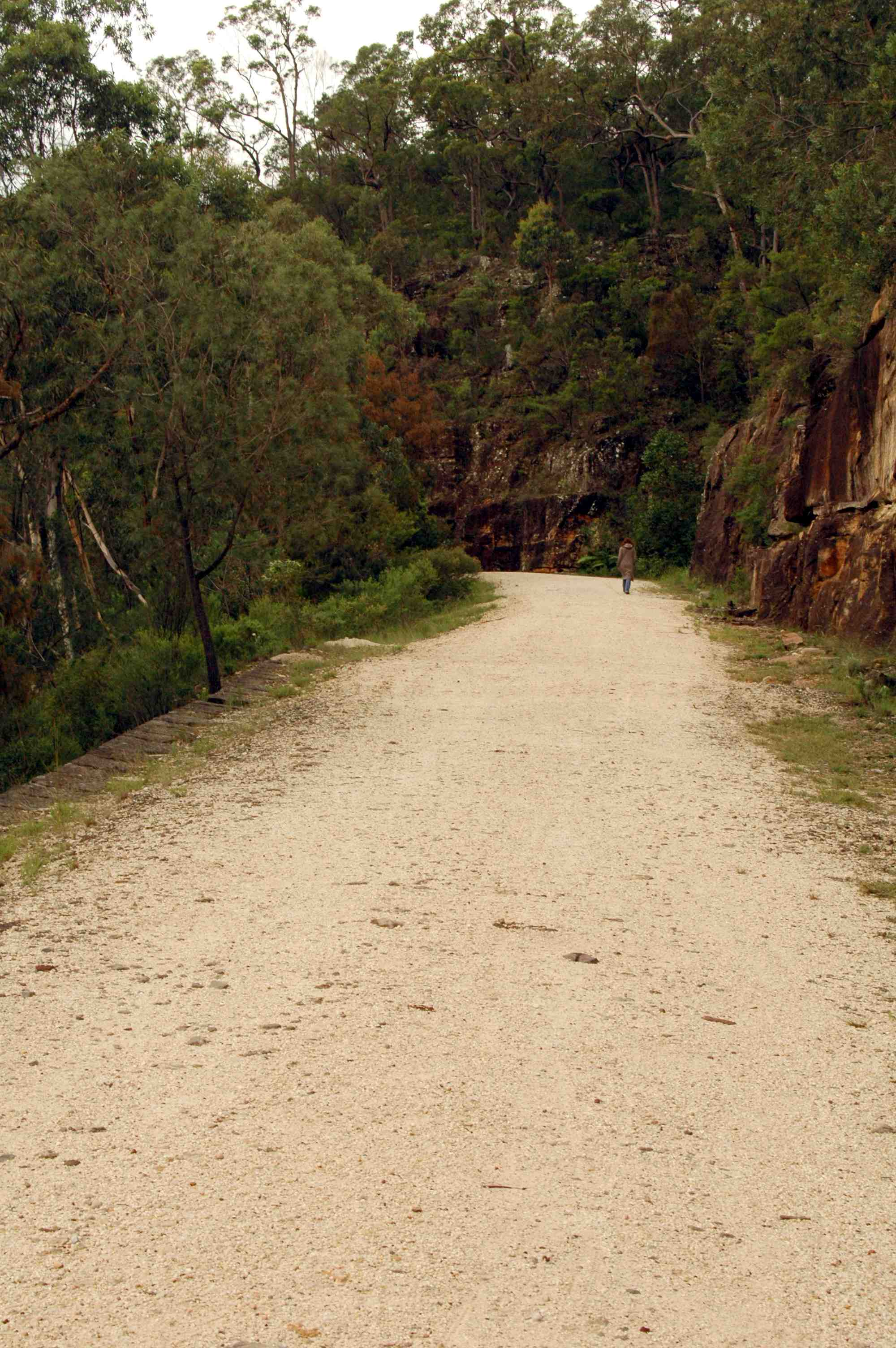
Devines Hill, just past the Thomas James Bridge; at the foot of the hill, vehicular traffic joins a newer road, leaving the GNR to walkers and cyclists

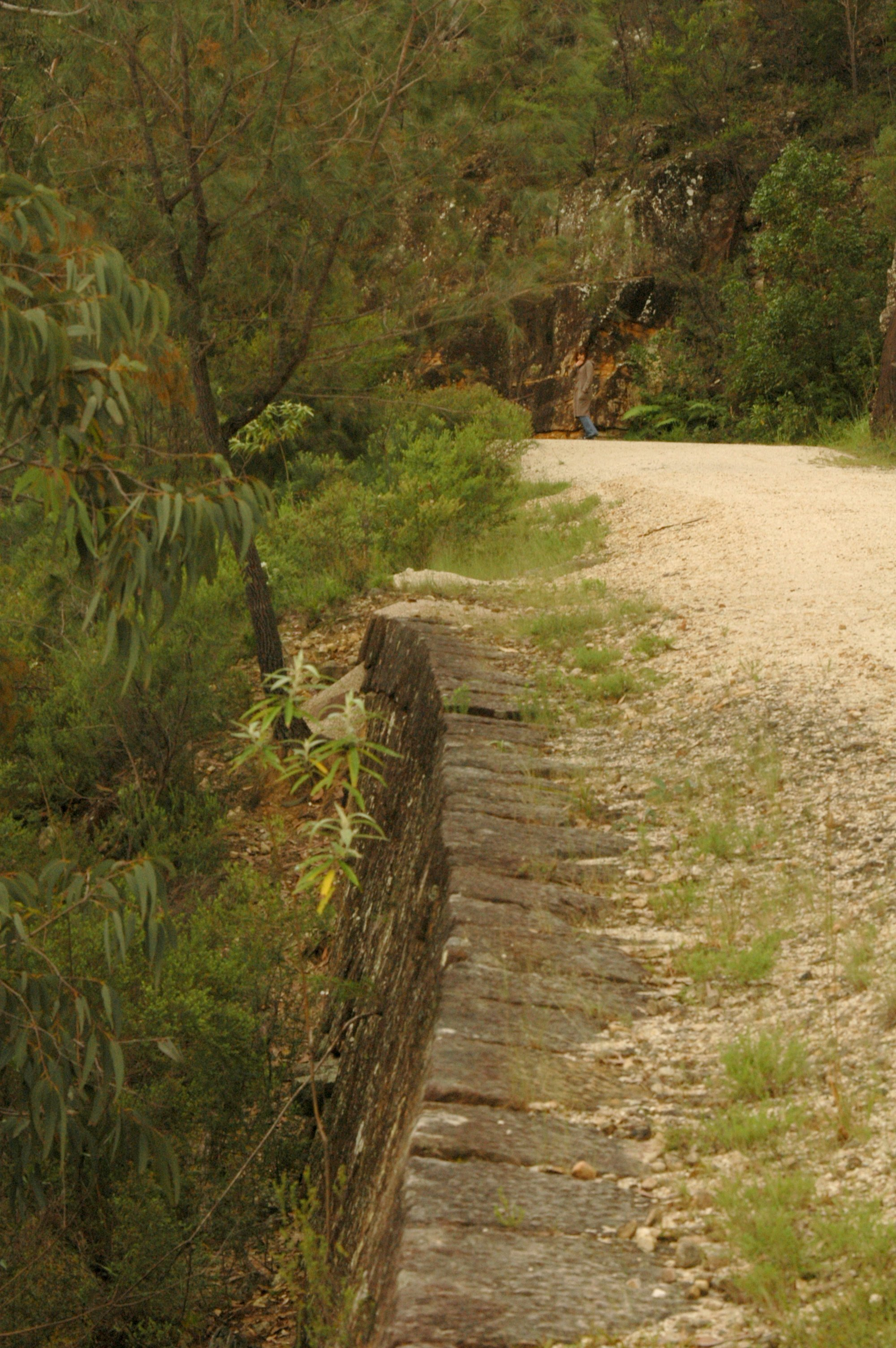
Embankment made of trimmed pieces of rock spoil from the blasting of the adjacent cutting, unused spoil litters the area below

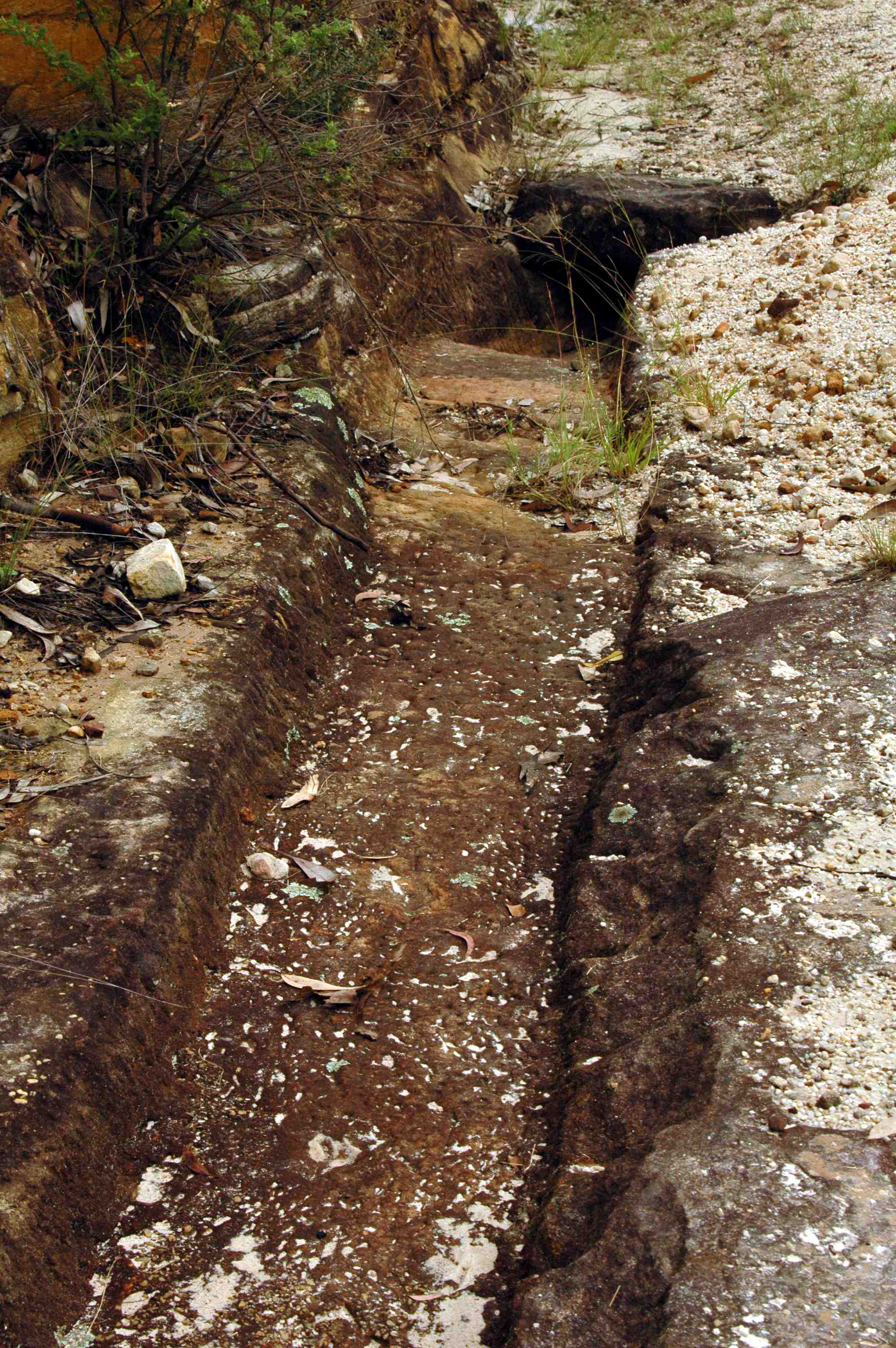
Closer view of the gutter

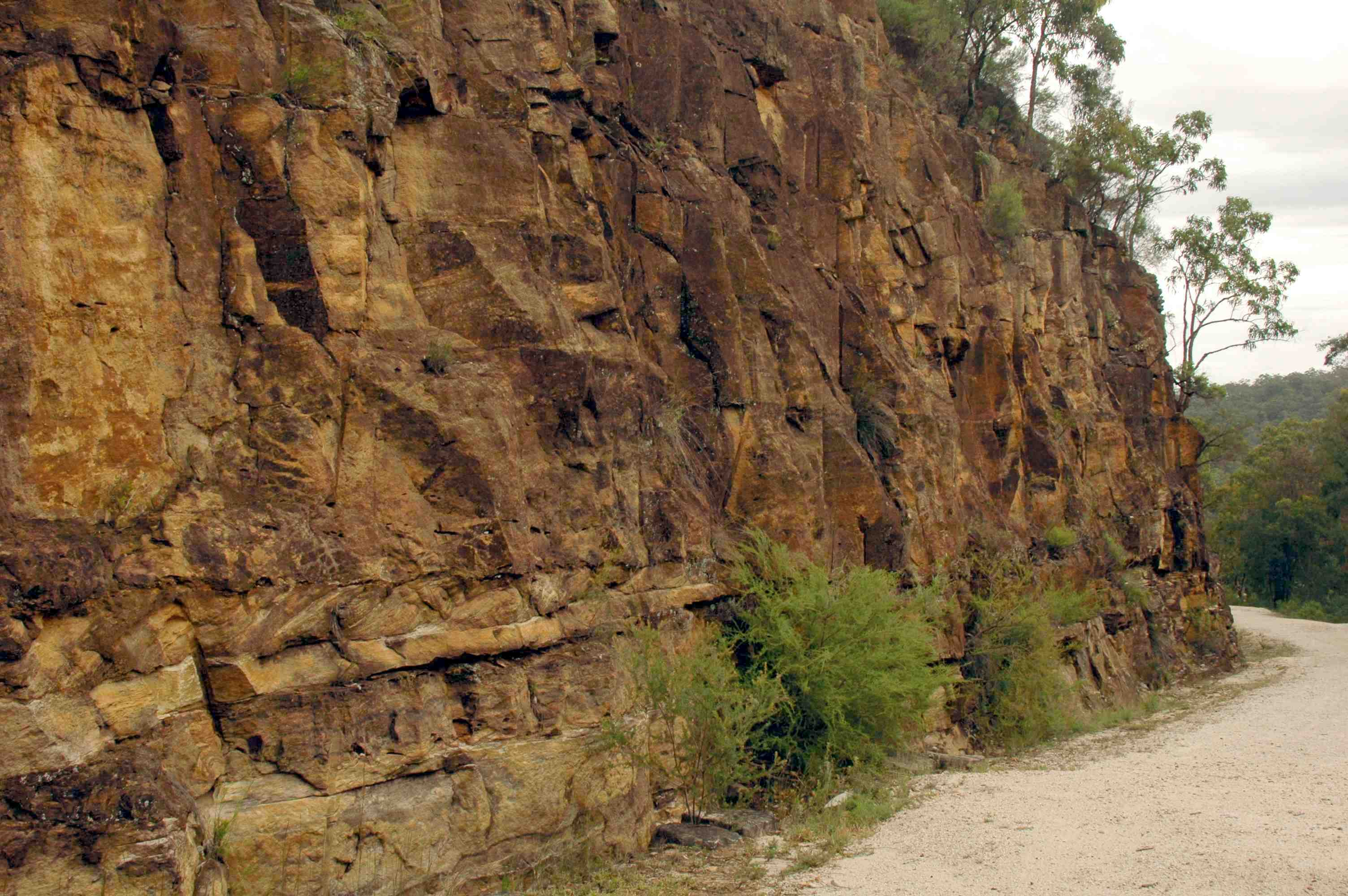
Cutting made by convict workers who would hammer a crowbar-like 'jumperbar' into the rock, fill the hole with gunpowder, plug the hole and ignite it; visible are metre-long 'half holes' that remained after the rock face was blown away

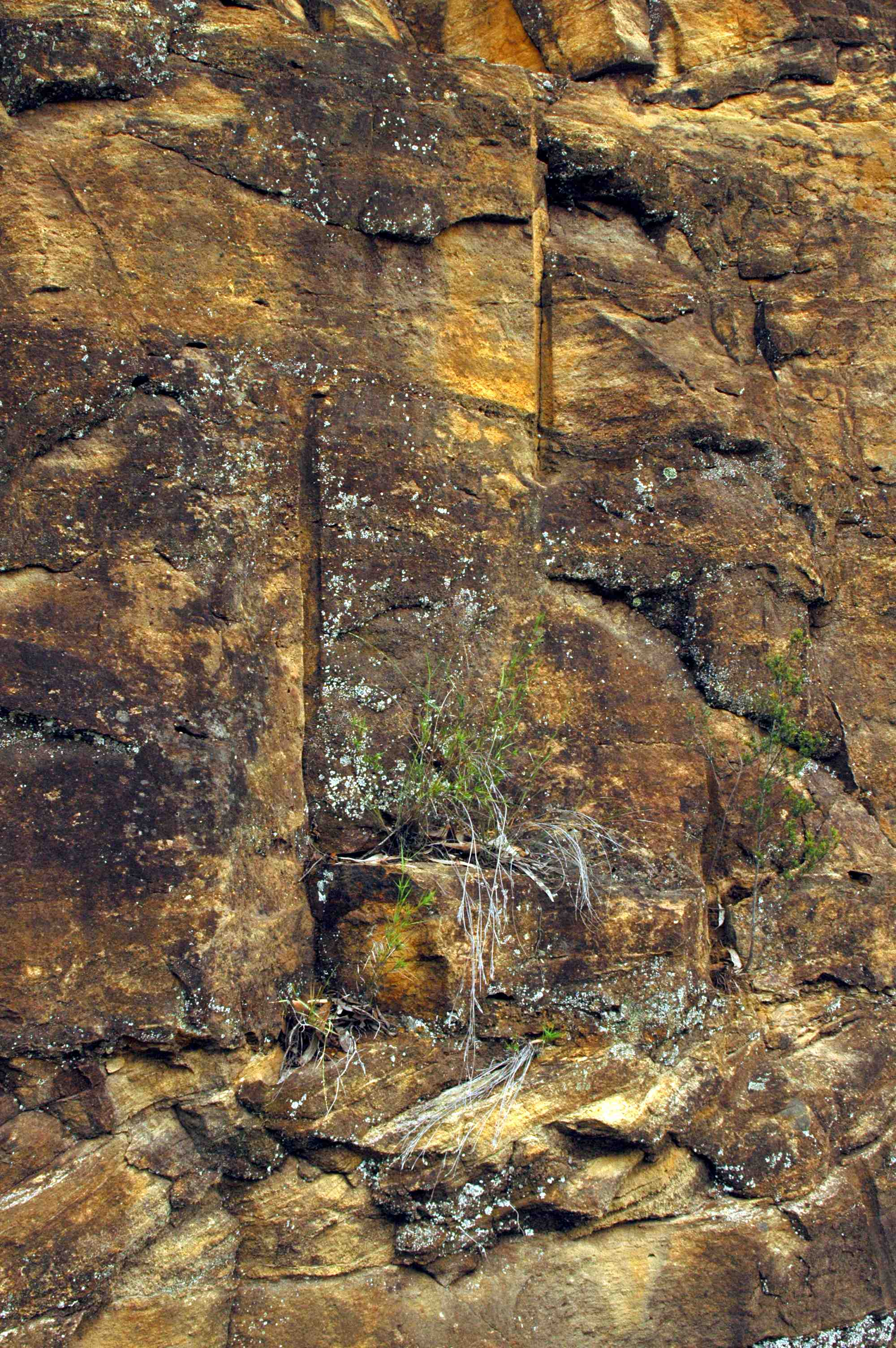
Close-up of 'half holes'

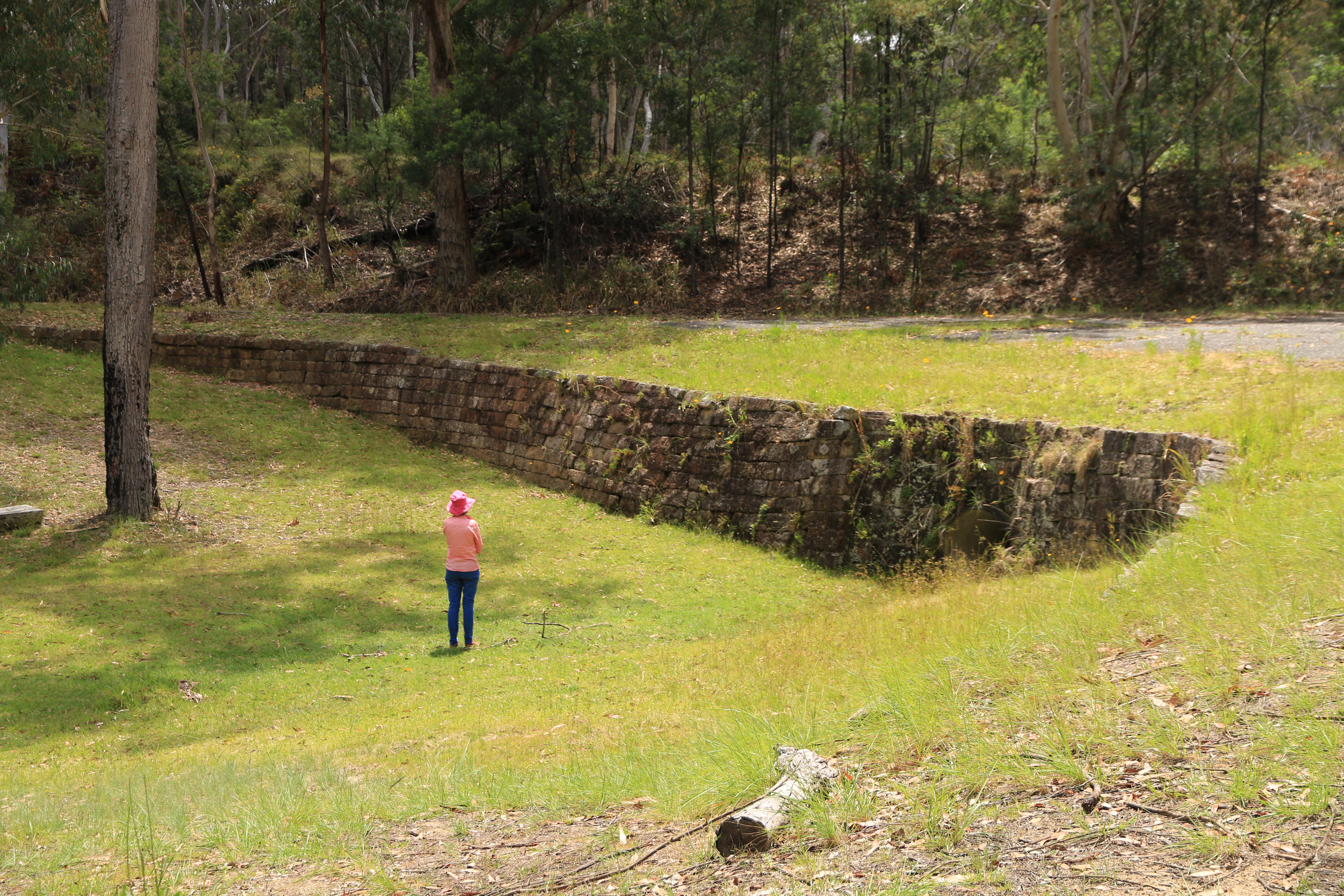
Convict-built Embankment, Mount McQuoid,
Great North Road, Bucketty, NSW.

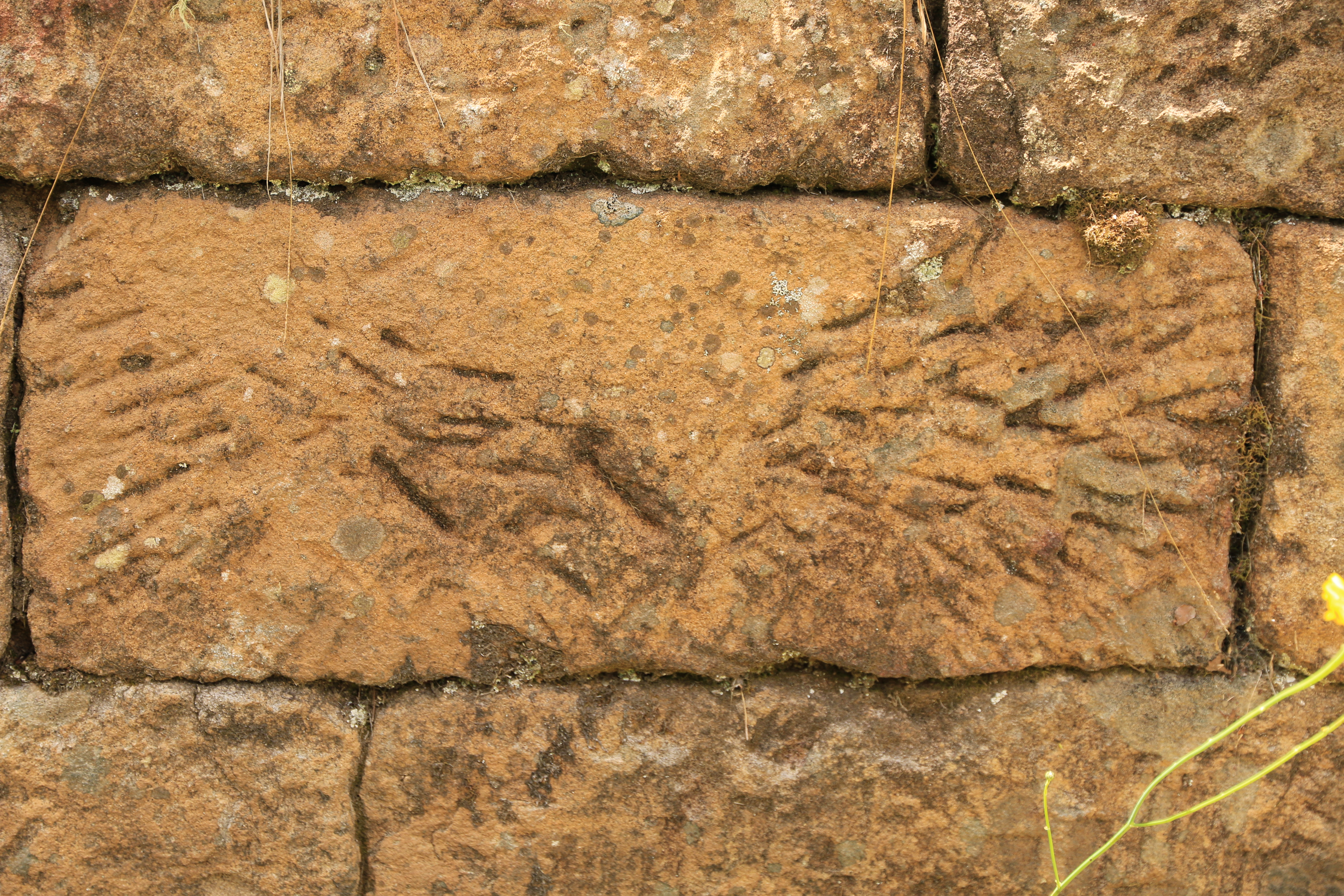
Convict-built embankment, Mount McQuoid,
Great North Road, Bucketty, NSW.
Distinctive markings on cut stones have been used in archaeological studies to estimate the number of convicts in an 'ironed-gang' i.e. offenders sentenced to work in chains, or other metal restraining devices, on heavy labouring tasks like road-making.
There are recognisable and recurring patterns, attributable to individual stone-cutters.

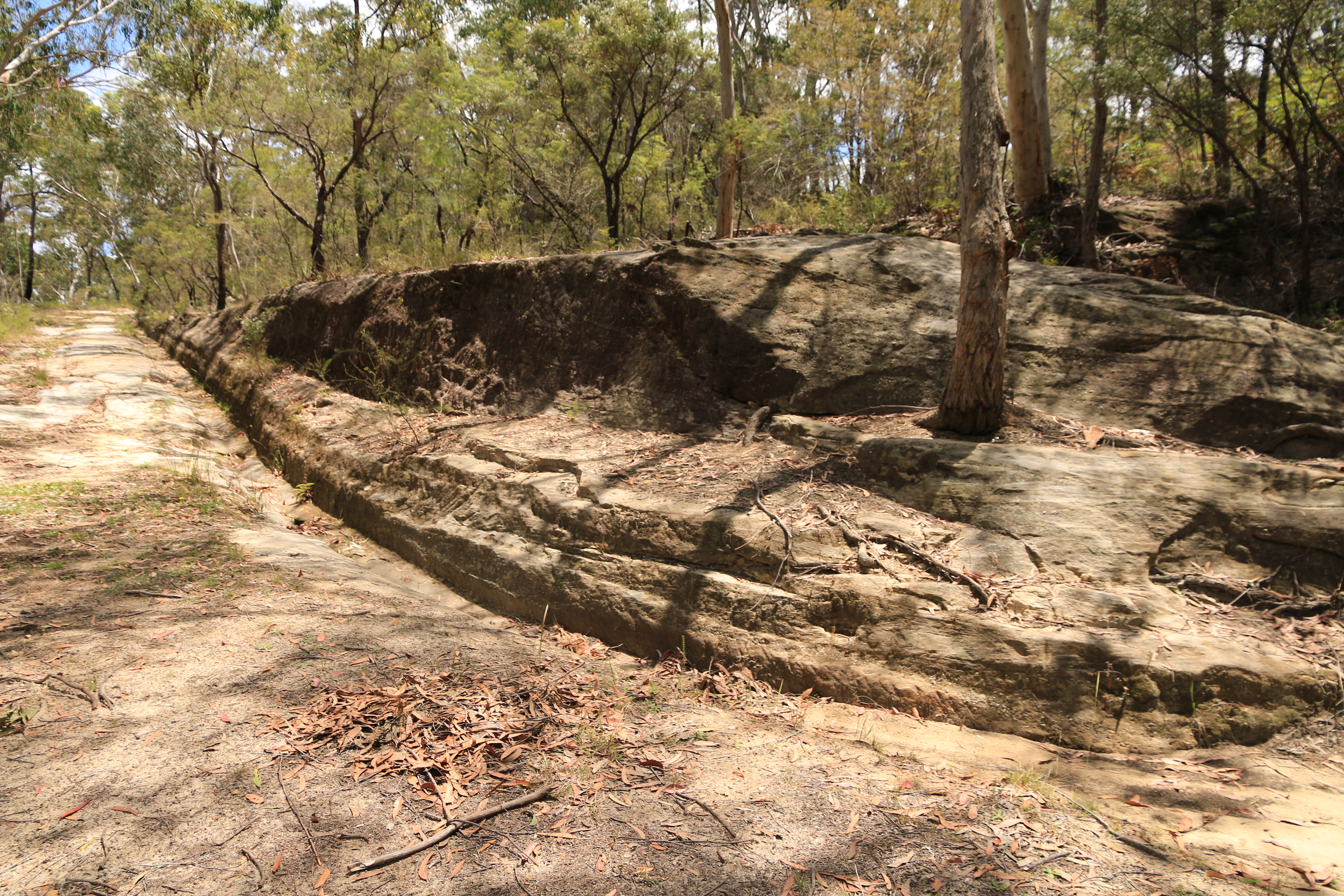
Convict-built road, Mount McQuoid,
Great North Road, Bucketty, NSW.
Gutter cut in stone.

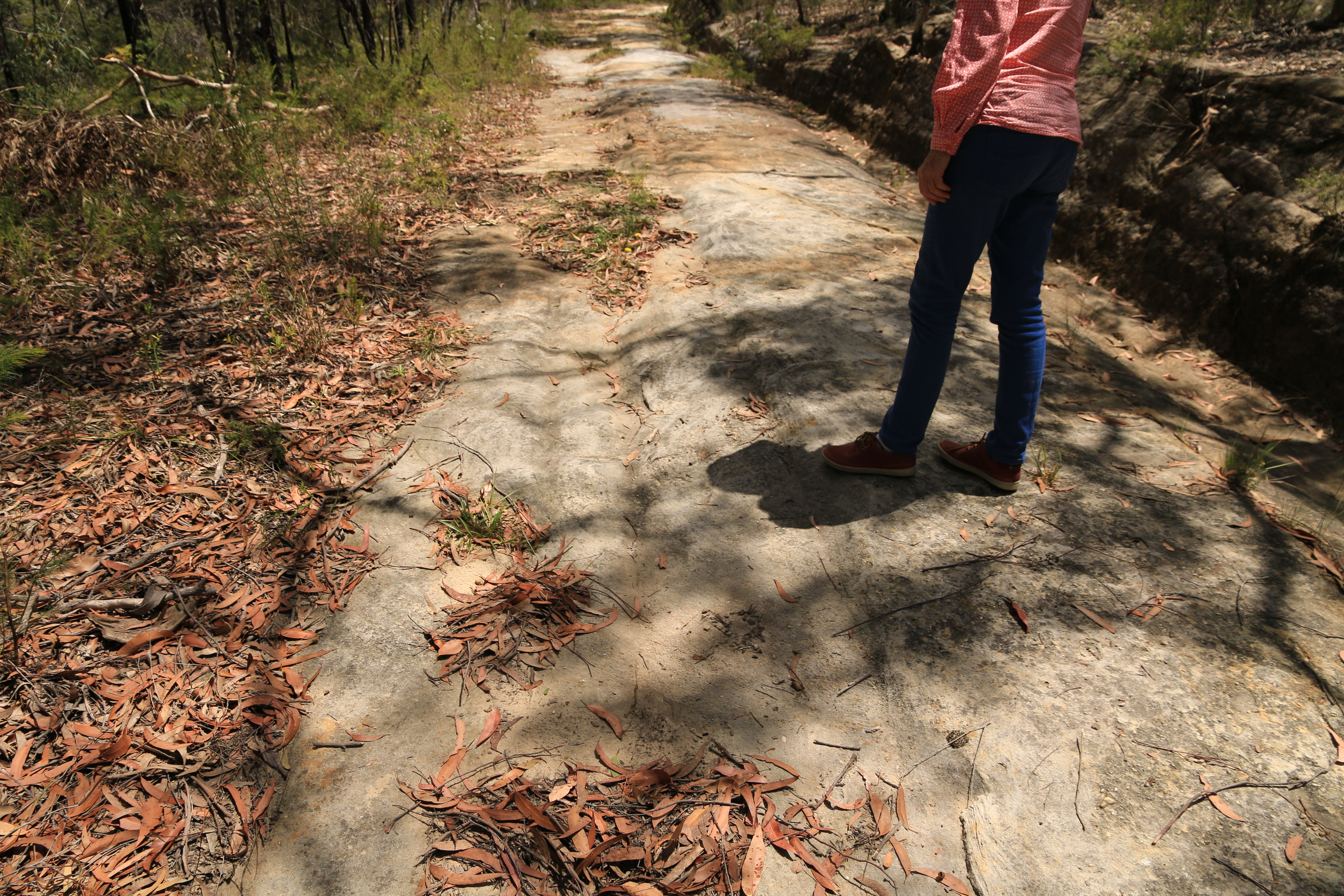
Convict-built road, Mount McQuoid,
Great North Road, Bucketty, NSW.
Cart-wheel tracks in stone.

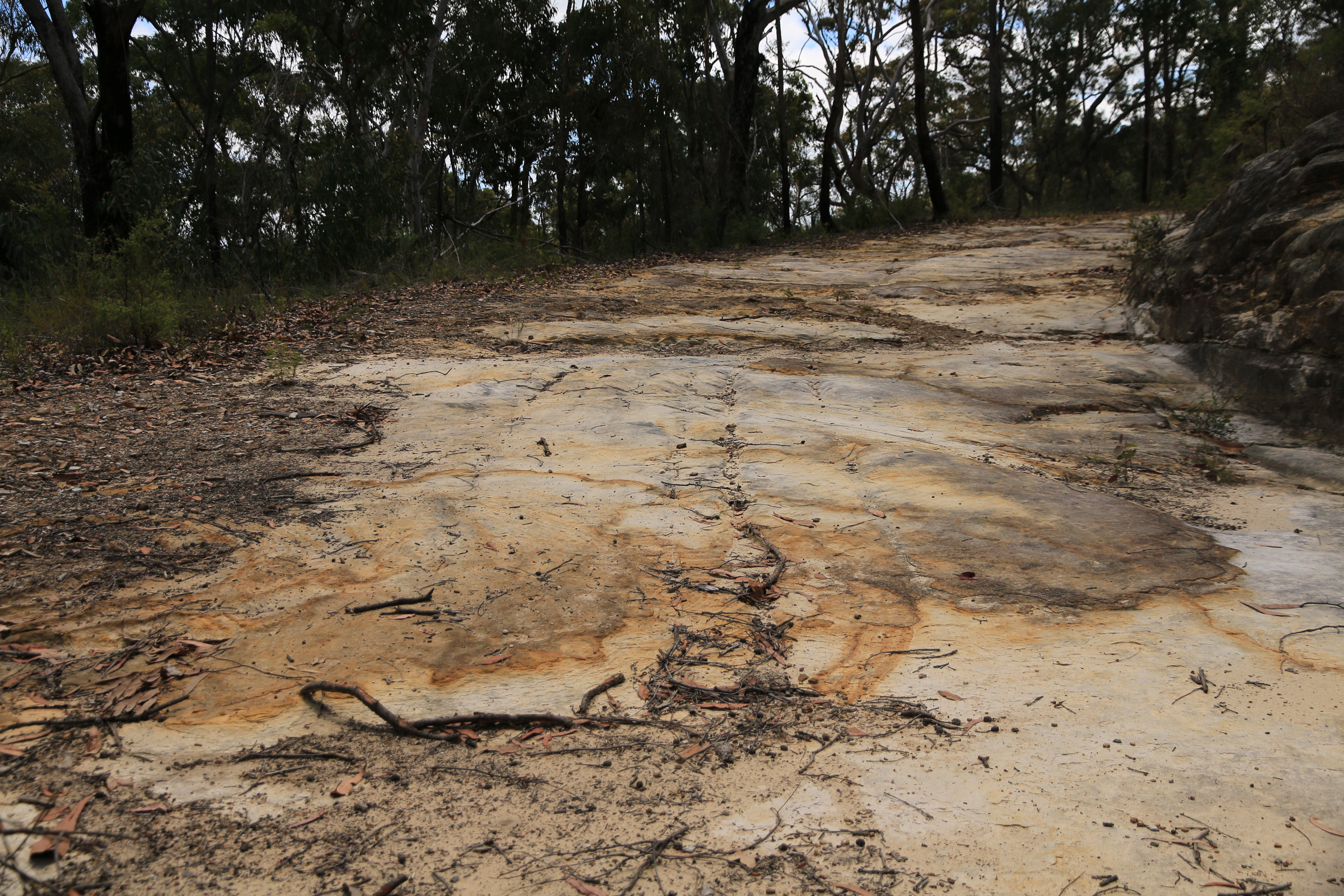
Convict-built road, Mount McQuoid,
Great North Road, Bucketty, NSW.

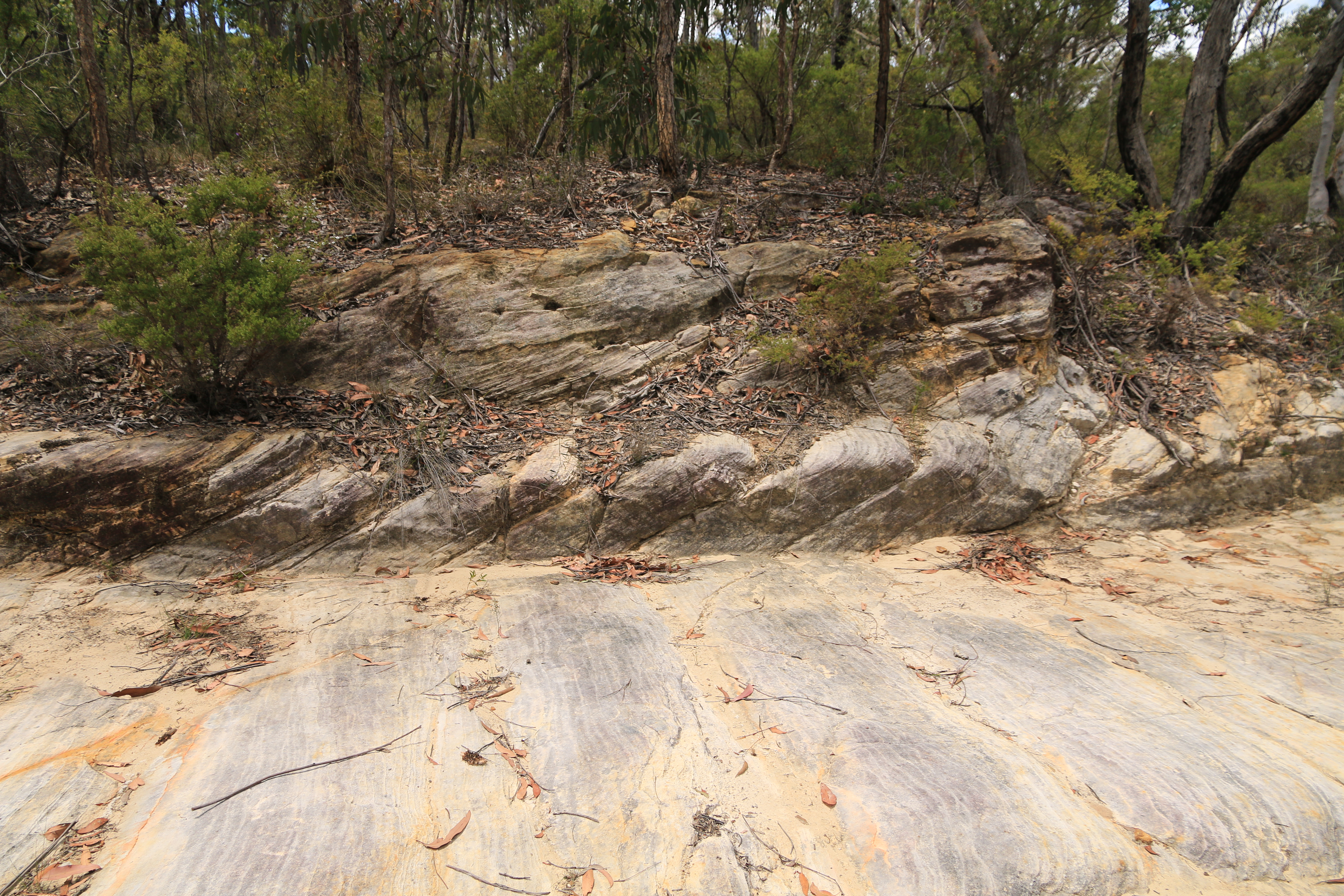
Convict-built road, Mount McQuoid,
Great North Road, Bucketty, NSW.

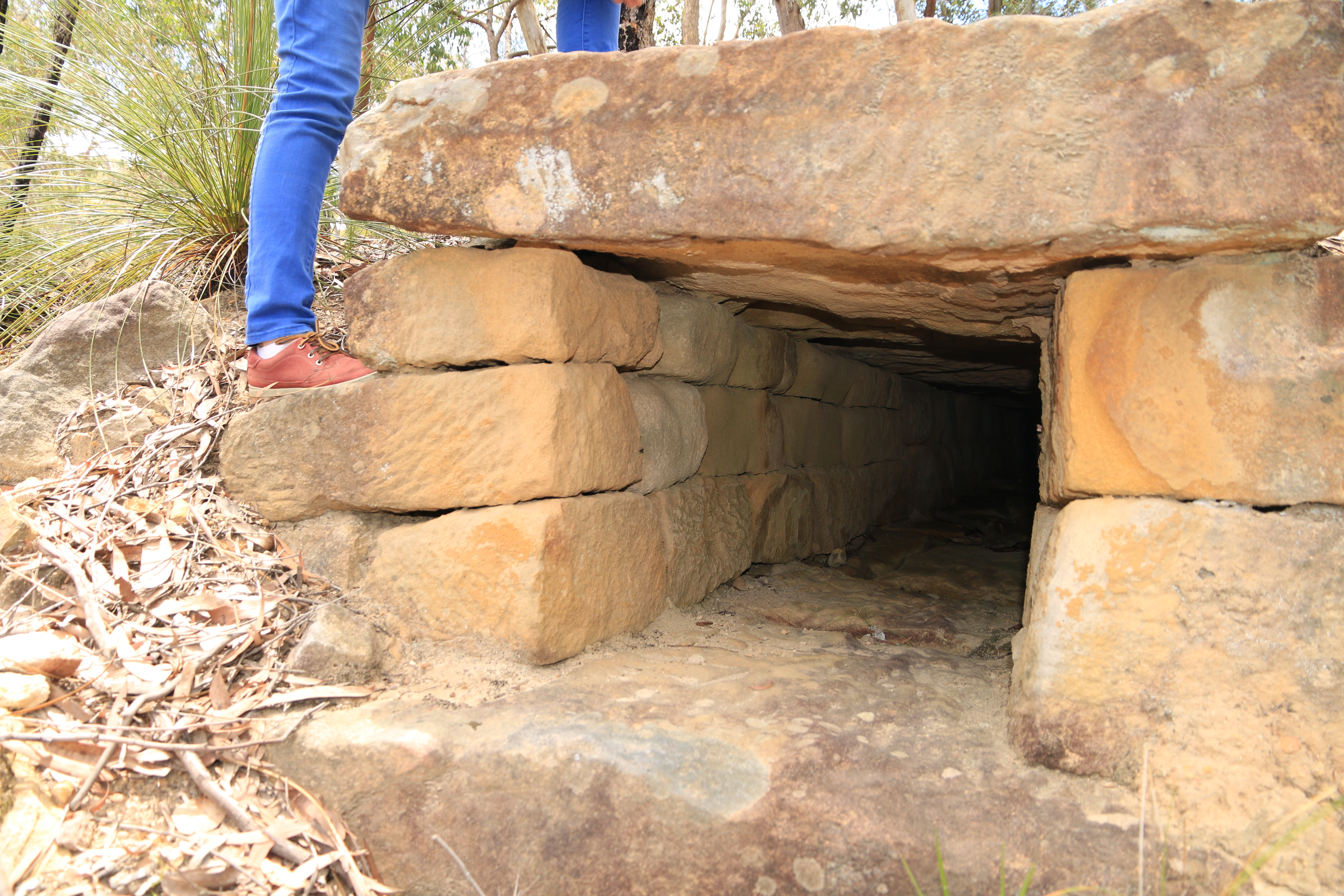
Convict-built road, Mount McQuoid,
Great North Road, Bucketty, NSW.
Stone box-drain culvert beneath road.

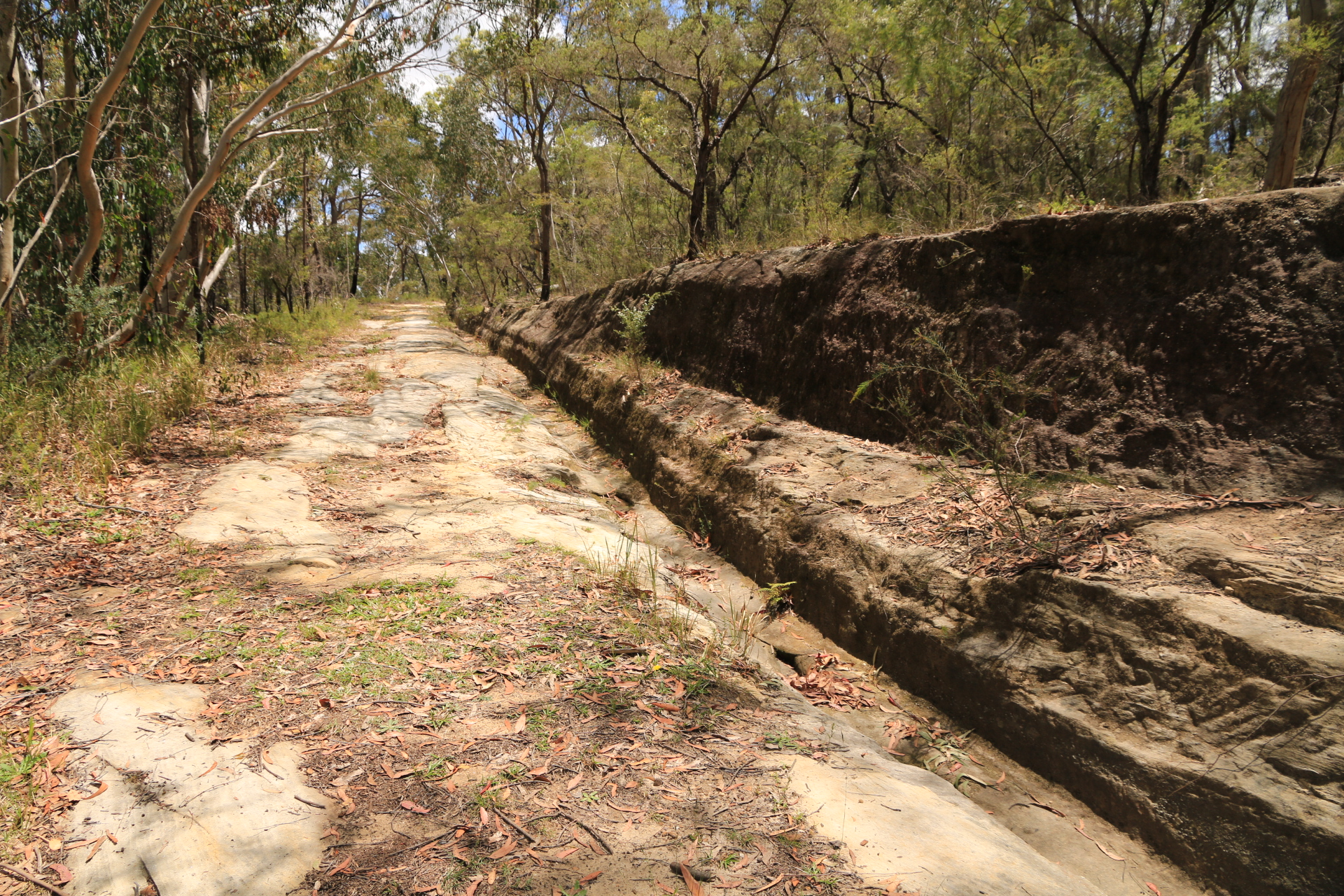
Convict-built road, Mount McQuoid, Great North Road, Bucketty, NSW.

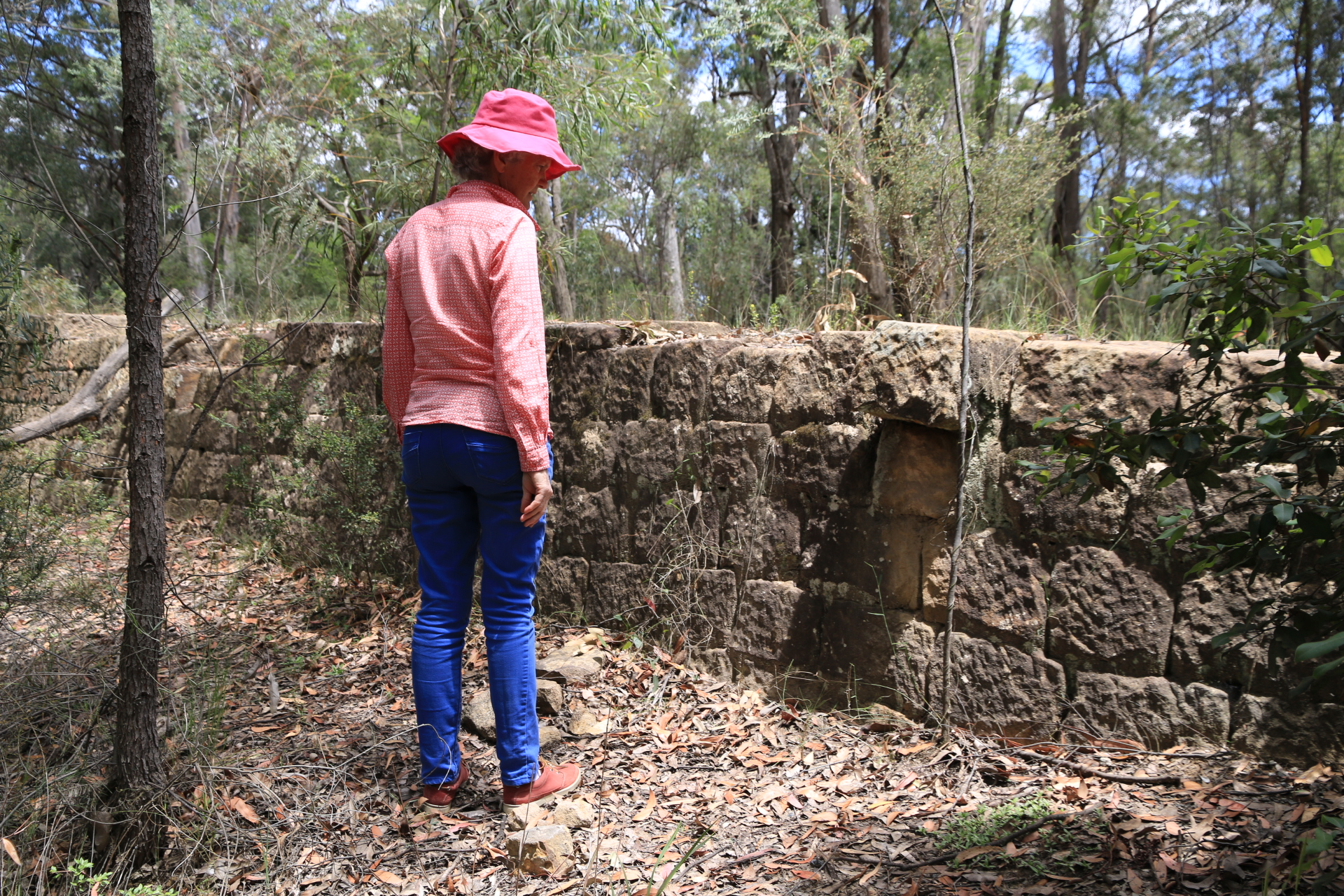
Convict-built stone embankment,
St Alban's Road Ramp, Great North Road, NSW.

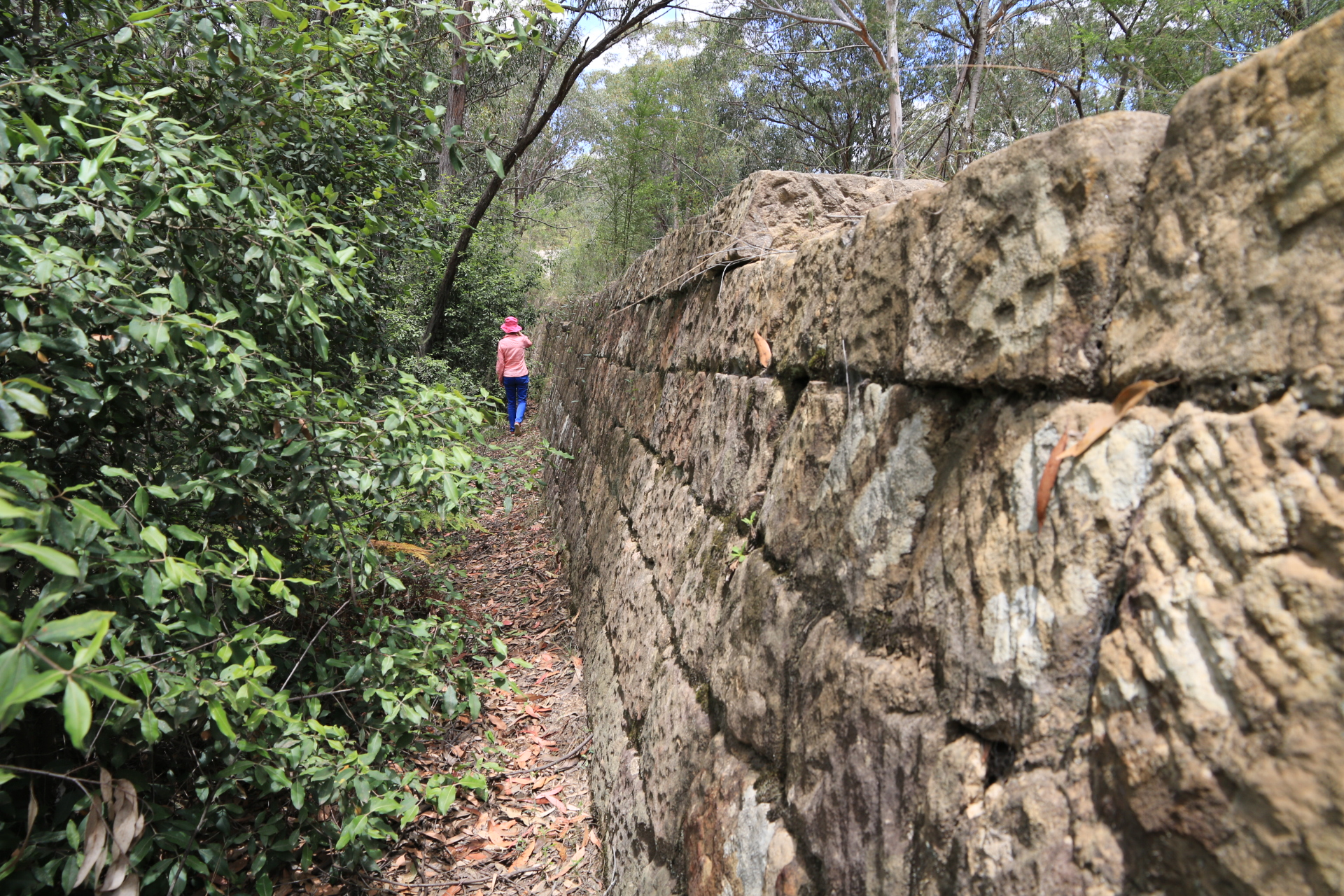
Convict-built stone embankment,
St Alban's Road Ramp, Great North Road, NSW.

== See also ==
- Old Great North Road (Devine's Hill to Mount Manning Section)
- Great North Road (Mount Manning to Wollombi Section)
- Australian Convict Sites
