= Mount Manning =

Mountain in New South Wales, Australia

- Location within New South Wales

Highest point
- Coordinates: 33°07′S 151°06′E

Geography
- Location: New South Wales, Australia

Mount Manning is a mountain located in New South Wales, Australia.
