= Rose Cottage, Wilberforce =

Rose Cottage
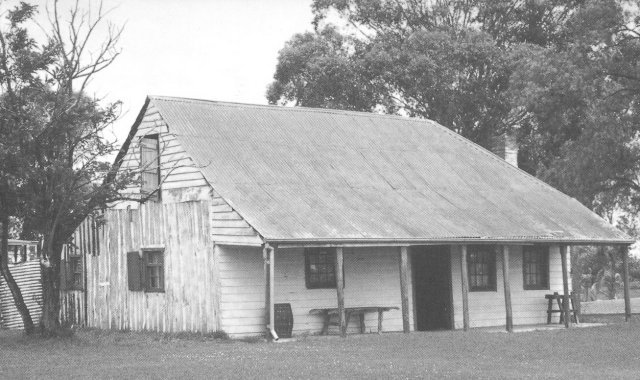

- Location within New South Wales Location within Australia
- 33.5656°S 150.8400°E
- Location: Rose Street, Wilberforce, City of Hawkesbury, New South Wales, Australia

History
- Built: 1810–1820

Site notes
- Owner: Thomas and Jane Rose Family Society Inc.

New South Wales Heritage Register
- Official name: Rose Cottage
- Type: State Heritage(Built)
- Designated: 2 April 1999
- Reference no.: 358
- Type: Cottage
- Category: Residential buildings (private)
- Builders: Thomas Rose

Rose Cottage is a heritage-listed former cottage and now museum at Rose Street, Wilberforce, City of Hawkesbury, New South Wales, Australia. It was built from 1810 to 1820 by Thomas Rose. The property is owned by the Thomas and Jane Rose Family Society Inc. It was added to the New South Wales State Heritage Register on 2 April 1999.

== History ==
=== Indigenous occupation ===
The lower Hawkesbury River was home to the Dharug people. The proximity to the Nepean River and South Creek qualifies it as a key area for food resources for indigenous groups. The Dharug and Darkinjung people called the river Deerubbin and it was a vital source of food and transport.

=== Early history of Wilberforce ===
Early European exploration of the Hawkesbury River began in 1789 with a series of expeditions initiated by Governor of New South Wales Arthur Phillip in his search for fertile land to serve the new colony's agricultural purposes. Although the Hawkesbury River valley was penetrated from Broken Bay to the site of present-day Windsor by 1790, evidence of very high floods observed by Phillip and other explorers prevented Governor Phillip from consenting to make land grants in the area.

Despite Phillip's unwillingness to settle the Hawkesbury, Lieutenant-Governor Major Francis Grose proceeded in making 22 land grants in the district of Mulgrave Place in 1794, less than two years after Phillip departed the colony. Grose may have resorted to settling the Hawkesbury due to a lack of land available in the area between Sydney and Parramatta, after Grose had made numerous grants there to members of the New South Wales Corps. Grose reported in a dispatch in 1794, "I have settled on the banks of the Hawkesbury twenty-two settlers, who seem very much pleased with their farms. They describe the soil as particularly rich, and they inform me whatever they have planted has grown in the greatest luxuriance."

The first land grants consisted of 30 acres each, all with frontage to the river. Nineteen of the original 22 settlers were former convicts who had finished serving their sentences. Despite the challenges posed by inexperience, poor seed stock, and a lack of livestock to drive ploughs, it was reported that within the first 12 months, the average yield at the Hawkesbury settlement was 25 bushels per acre, double the yield elsewhere in the colony. Spurred on by the initial success, further grants of 25 to 30 acres were made to former convicts, with larger grants going to men from the New South Wales Corps. The European population of the Hawkesbury area increased to 546 inhabitants in the 1795 muster.

Despite a rise in water recorded in 1795, which caused many early Hawkesbury settlers to leave the area, farming of the fertile floodplains by a new influx of settlers continued to increase. These early farmers concentrated their activities on the low lying land along the river, ignoring the ridgelines in favour of the more fertile land below. Floods recorded in 1799, 1800 and 1801 severely impacted the colony's economy, leading to vastly inflated prices for food and stores. However, the farming returns in 1802 were good enough for most farmers to pay off the debts incurred in the preceding three years.

Soil erosion, caused by livestock, farming practices, and the recent flooding, began to be noted as a problem by 1803. In that year, Governor King introduced a measure to prevent erosion, prohibiting the removal of trees and shrubs within ten metres of the riverbanks. In 1804, King further established six commons for stock grazing, including Wilberforce Common.

Despite these steps, the impact of the floods of 1806 and 1809 was immense. The river rose three times in 1806 and twice in 1809, causing damage to thousands of hectares of crops and losses amounting to tens of thousands of pounds. Again, food and grain prices became highly inflated, and government rations were reduced. Questions as to the feasibility of relying on the Hawkesbury as the main food source of the colony began to be posed by William Paterson, who was administering the colony in 1809.

Governor Macquarie arrived in the colony in the wake of the 1809 flood disaster, and within 12 months of his arrival, had established the five 'Macquarie Towns': Windsor, Richmond, Wilberforce, Pitt Town and Castlereagh. He sited the towns on higher ground and induced the settlers to relocate their dwellings to higher land in order to minimise the threat of damage from flooding. The towns were laid out on a rectangular grid plan, with a major public square in a central position. Each town was to have a combined school house/church building, with separate land grants set aside for the school master and clergyman. Under the leadership of Macquarie, the Hawkesbury settlers experienced a heretofore unknown level of stability.

Commissioner of Inquiry John Thomas Bigge arrived from England in 1820 in order to investigate the state of the colony on behalf of the Crown. Bigge's comments on the farming industry in the Hawkesbury River region reflect both the challenges faced by the settlers and the incomparable fertility of the soil. In his 1823 Report, Bigge referred to the flood plain soil as "distinguished by its depth and inexhaustible fertility. It lies on both sides of the rivers Nepean and Hawkesbury, and the largest tract is that which is formed by a bend of the latter river between the town of Windsor and the township of Wilberforce." Bigge reported that in 1820, the towns of Windsor, Wilberforce and Richmond had 10,000 acres of wheat or maize sown in a total 16,856 acres of cleared land, the most in the colony.

In contrast to the fertility of the soil, Bigge commented on the poor state of the farms in the region, stating that "the farms, or rather allotments, in these districts [of the Hawkesbury] are small; the houses generally ill-built and exhibiting traces of former inundations...[the] more opulent settlers have begun to fence their estates with strong railing made of stringy and iron bark trees." He attributed the poor state of farm buildings in the colony to the cost and lack of "mechanical labour," as well as the carelessness of many of the settlers.

Wilberforce tended to have a higher proportion of free settlers to former convicts than the other Macquarie towns. The Reverend Cartwright reported in 1819 to the Bigge Commission that church attendance was good at Wilberforce, and the congregation was composed mainly of the "regular families." The combined school house/church was constructed in 1819 and is now the last building of the original school house. A steam mill was established by Buttsworth in 1835 near the river facing Buttsworth Lane. From the end of Buttsworth Lane, a punt crossed the Hawkesbury to Pitt Town Bottoms from as early as 1812.

=== Land grants ===
Upon Thomas Rose's arrival in NSW in 1793, he and the other settlers from the ship Bellona were given land grants in an area near present day Strathfield, which they named "Liberty Plains" after the fact that they were all free settlers. Thomas Rose selected 120 acres on the right bank of Powell's Creek. Despite being an experienced farmer, Rose struggled with the poor soil at Liberty Plains, and by 1802 purchased 15 acres of land known as Laurel Farm on the banks of the Hawkesbury River near Wilberforce, approximately one mile from the site of Rose Cottage. Thomas Rose lost everything in the floods of 1806 and 1809.

The land on which Rose Cottage is now situated is part of a 30 acre grant to William Mackay made by Governor Hunter in 1797. In January 1806 Mackay transferred the north-eastern half of his grant, described as "that part to Howarth's Farm" to James Roberts. Two months later, Roberts sold this land to W. M. Nowland, a blacksmith, who then sold the land to Joshua Rose in 1809.

Thomas Rose and his wife had been accompanied on their voyage from England on the Bellona by their four children, Thomas (to avoid confusion, herein referred to as Thomas II), Mary, Joshua and Richard, aged 13, 11, 9 and 3 respectively. After arriving in the colony, Thomas Rose had three more children. Most of Thomas and Jane's children remained in Australia, many establishing farms of their own along the Hawkesbury River. The family appears to have retained a patriotism for England, as Thomas II and Joshua returned to England c. 1803-1806, and father and sons contributed subscriptions to the Waterloo fund in 1816.

=== Construction of Rose Cottage ===
Despite widespread secondary sources indicating that it was Thomas Rose who acquired the subject land, there is no primary documentary evidence to support this. It was certainly his son Joshua Rose who was the first Rose family owner of the land. There is no firm documentary evidence relating to the construction of Rose Cottage; our dating is based on the physical evidence remaining at the cottage. The vertical timber slab construction technique and the pre-1820 gudgeon hinges used in Doors 1, 2, 3, 6 and 7 provide a strong indication that the main part of the cottage (Spaces 1, 2, 5, 6, and the verandah) was built in the period 1809-1820. The original plan form of the cottage was much the same as it is today; however the rear skillion may have been added at another time in the early 19th century. The physical evidence for this later addition includes the use of weather boards inside the skillion, and the use of bush poles for refters, whereas the rafters of the main swing are split.

Previous attempts to date the cottage through documentary sources have generally relied on two historical events: Governor Macquarie's General Offer stating requirements for the size and materials of new dwellings in the five Macquarie towns made 15 December 1810, and the reputed visit of Reverend Samuel Leigh to 'old Tom Rose's home' in 1817. In his report on Rose Cottage in 1982, Alan Roberts, Field and Research Officer for the Royal Australian Historical Society, concluded that this evidence for the date of the cottage is questionable, neither proving nor disproving the claim that Rose Cottage was built in the period 1811-1817. Roberts points out that Rose Cottage is not in full compliance with Macquarie's promulgation of 1810, and no source for Rev. Leigh's reference to 'old Tom Rose's home' was found. Additionally, this reference does not necessarily indicate Rose Cottage, merely whichever house Thomas Rose Senior was occupying at the time.

The question of which members of the family occupied Rose Cottage is also open to speculation. Thomas Rose's land at Laurel Farm was rented to one J. Armstrong in the 1821 Return of Land in Wilberforce. Although he owned the farm at Rose Cottage between 1809 and 1850, Joshua Rose was listed in the 1828 Census as a resident of Lower Portland head. An 1818 surveyor's field book makes reference to 'Rose's hut' at that location, which indicates that Joshua had built a dwelling on his Portland head holding by this time. The muster records of 1818, 1819, 1821 and 1822 do not provide conclusive evidence as to which member of the family was farming the land. The 1841 census records both Joshua and Thomas II as residents of Wilberforce.

In 1850, Joshua transferred the subject land to his brother, Thomas II, in an unregistered dealing recited in a 1913 conveyance. Joshua retained a small strip of land bordering the subject land to the southwest, which remained in the Rose family until 1955. In 1854, Thomas II composed his will, leaving Rose Cottage as well as Laurel Farm to his son Charles:

I devised All that parcel of land containing 14 acres more or less part of Mackay's Grant situate at Wilberforce aforesaid with the buildings thereon now in my own occupation. Also all that parcel of land containing 15 acres more or less part of Laurell's [sic] Grant situate at Wilberforce aforesaid now in my own occupation unto and to the use of the said Charles Rose his heirs and assigns forever But subject to and charged (with the personal estate herein before bequeathed to him) with the payment of the following legacies namely To each of them the said Mary Ann Graham - Thomas Rose - Richard Coley - Alexander Milson - Maria Stewart and Charlotte Flannery the sum of twenty five pounds and I direct the legacies hereinbefore bequeathed to be paid at the end of one year from my decease.....

Of the four farms mentioned in Thomas II's will, totalling 89 acres, the only reference to a building is that made above, on the land where Rose Cottage is presently located. This is the earliest documentary evidence (1854) positively identifying the existence of structures on the subject land.

Thomas II and his de facto spouse Ann were reported to be safe in the attic during the devastation 1867 flood of the Hawkesbury, while the flood waters reached a height of one metre on the ground floor of the cottage. Possibly due to the damage caused by this flood or upon Thomas II's death in 1869 when his son Charles inherited the cottage, several repairs to the cottage were carried out in the lat 19th century. Hardwood weatherboards were fixed over the vertical slabs to the east of the rear door (south elevation) and the eastern gable. Beaded lining boards were added to the south and east with a Victorian moulded-top skirting board along the east wall. At some time in the 19th century, corrugated galvanised steel sheeting was fixed over the roof and original shingles, and guttering was probably first installed.

=== Farm subdivision ===
Charles Rose, Thomas II's son, was the proprietor of the place from 1869 until his death in May 1911. However, it is unknown whether Charles resided there. His occupation was as a carrier. He married Marry Ann Green in 1859 at his uncle Henry's station at Warialda, NSW, and at least his first 6 children were born there (between 1860 and 1874).

In his will dated 20 May 1911, Charles Rose devised:

All those my thirteen and three quarter acres of land more or less at Wilberforce whereon I now reside Unto and to the use of my two sons John Henry Rose and Richard Alfred Harold Rose in equal shares their respective heirs and assigns for ever to be divided by a line from the road to the river Hawkesbury so that my son John Henry Rose shall take as his half the portion on which is the Homestead and the other buildings and being the part adjoining the property of Edward Thomas Bowd and so that my son Richard Alfred Harold Rose shall take as his half the other portion on which is the house erected by him.

Charles Rose died 28 May 1911 and his wife Mary Ann died in 1912. In December 1913, John and Richard registered an indenture describing the two equal parcels of land, each measuring 6.3.12 1/2 acres. Fenced boundary lines are noted in the indenture between John's parcel and Bowd's farm (on Howith's grant) and between Richard's parcel and the small strip of land formerly owned by Joshua Rose. In the indenture, John is listed as a farmer, and Richard as a dairyman.

Physical changes made to the cottage in the early 20th century may have been made by John Rose after receiving the cottage upon the death of his parents. (The repairs could also have been made to make the cottage more comfortable for Charles and Mary Ann Rose in the later years of their lives.) Pine weatherboards were fixed over the slabs on the west side of the rear door (south elevation), over the fixed internally to all walls in the front room, as well as the west and south walls in the front bedroom, and on the north wall in the kitchen. Additionally, the stepladder to the attic was rebuilt and lined with similar boards to the walls.

=== Australiana Pioneer Village ===
After John Henry Rose's death in 1961, Rose Cottage, including the other half of the land devised to Richard in Charles' 1911 will, was purchased by Dugald McLachlan. McLachlan was the proprietor of the Tropicana Hotel, next door to Rose Cottage, and envisioned making Rose Cottage the centrepiece of a theme park called the Australiana Pioneer Village. McLachlan went on to acquire almost all of Mackay's original 30-acre grant, and set about moving other old buildings from their original locations to the site. The Australiana Pioneer Village was opened to a tourist attraction in 1970, featuring Rose Cottage, as well the Kurrajong railway station and the 1850s police station from Riverstone.

Repairs to the cottage carried out by Bill McLachlan in establishing the Pioneer Village included bagging over and cementing walls in the two bedrooms, replacing rotted bases to verandah posts, laying a concrete floor to the verandah, installing metal flashing above the wall plate, and adding new guttering. The earliest photographs recording the state of the cottage prior to this repairs are part of a Richmond High School report made in 1965. These photographs show a grapevine trellage and agave to the south of the cottage, as well as the branches of a large peppercorn tree to the west of the cottage. The 1961 gutters are also visible.

The Pioneer Village changed hands several times in the ensuing years, with Mawsons Hotel Pty Ltd the dominant controlling interest between 1969 and 1983. When Mawsons began seeking interested buyers for the Village, the future of Rose Cottage became an increasingly pressing concern. Following Alan Roberts' report on behalf of the Royal Australian Historical Society in 1982, Gordon Fuller & Associates, architect, wrote to the National Trust of Australia (NSW) urging the body to classify Rose Cottage as a matter of urgency, and to make representations to the Heritage Council of NSW for the making of a Permanent Conservation Order under the NSW Heritage Act, "excising the building and site from the remainder of the Pioneer Village property". Fuller's report followed an inspection of the site and made recommendations of the works which would be necessary to preserve the building.

In August 1985, Permanent Conservation Order No. 358 was placed on Rose Cottage by the Heritage Council of NSW. The Order applied to the current title boundary of Rose Cottage. The following month, Hawkesbury City Council acquired the entire Australiana Pioneer Village, including Rose Cottage. In 1988, the Council debated donating ownership of Rose Cottage to the Thomas and Jane Rose Family Society, Inc. (established in 1975), with some councillors opposed to the donation saying that it was the most important building in the Pioneer Village, and therefore worth keeping. Another councillor expressed that "It's not the sort of heritage that we like to live up to." In 1988 Clive Lucas, Stapleton and Partner wrote a Conservation Analysis and Draft Policy for Treatment of Fabric for the Heritage Council of NSW on Rose Cottage.

In 1993, Hawkesbury City Council leased Rose Cottage to the Thomas and Jane Rose Family Society, and in 1995 transferred the title. Substantial stabilisation works were carried out under the NSW Heritage Assistance Program in 1994, with repairs made to the roof, foundations, flooring, cladding, windows, chimneys and fireplaces, directed by Otto Cserhalmi & Associates, architects.

== Description ==
=== Cottage ===
The cottage is located to the southwest of the lot, near to the boundary with the Heritage Hotel-Motel. The cottage is an early 19th century colonial vernacular structure. Single storey with attic containing four rooms, verandah to the north side. Constructed with a mixture of vertical slab, timber frame, split lath, mud infill, and weatherboard. The main roof is framed in split rafters for shingle roofing; a skillion roof to the south is framed in bush poles. Hipped roof at west; gabled at east. Two brick chimneys on west elevation.

=== Grounds and garden ===
The 2282 meter square property, herein called the garden, is located on a wide flat ridge above the Hawkesbury River flood plain which lies to the east. The property is bounded by Rose Street to the northeast, the Australiana Pioneer Village to the south and southeast, private property with a dwelling to the east, and the Heritage Hotel-Motel to the west. The property is enclosed by fencelines on all sides, some possibly reconstructed as part of the Australiana Pioneer Village.

The entrance to the property is via a pedestrian gate at the northwest; pedestrian and vehicular gates on the southwest provide access to a track in the Australiana Pioneer Village.

The cottage is surrounded on all sides by grassed areas with patches of rose bush cultivation and several trees, including white cedar (Melia azedarach var.australasica), false acacia/black locust (Robinia pseudoacacia), Citrus sp., a bed of roses to the cottage's west. A significant pepper(corn) tree (Schinus molle) is in the southern boundary. A significant rose shrub (Rosa cv.) is at the south-east corner of the cottage and a wattle (Acacia sp.) to the east of the cottage. Other plantings of moderate significance are a gum tree (Eucalyptus sp.) is to the cottage's south west, a grove of eucalypts to the cottage's south, a willow (Salix sp.) to its southeast, a quince (Cydonia oblonga cv.) to its south-west and the remains of former fence corner posts to the cottage's north east.

Landscape items of some significance include: a former boundary line indicated by eucalypts and pine trees (Pinus sp.), fencing at the southern end of the spray area, parallel to the river, a fenced boundary line to the cottage's east extending to the river, riverside vegetation, the remainder of the associated land and shed 1.

With a few exceptions the plantings appear to be post 1961. Rose Cottage exhibits a sense of containment due to its elevated position. Related landscape features are a "forecourt" area and an area at the back of the cottage and outbuildings.

=== Other site features ===
A water cistern is located at the Rose Street frontage of the Heritage Hotel-Motel, reportedly constructed by the Rose family. Victorian brick dome construction with concrete capping, late 19th century, but possibly over an earlier structure.

=== Outbuildings ===
Two sheds are located along the boundaries, to the south and west; and an outbuilding is located close to the south elevation of the cottage.

Rose Cottage's outbuildings consist of two distinct construction phases.

- Outbuilding - west: single-storey, slab walls with bush pole framed sloping roof sheeted in old corrugated galvanised iron, concrete floor, c.1880.
- Outbuilding - east: single-storey, sloping roof sheeted in corrugated galvanised iron, slab walls and sawn and chamfered hardwood rafters, earth floor, early 20th century.
- Shed 1: single-storey, pitched roof bush pole, timber slab and corrugated galvanised iron, steel mesh, and pipe construction with granolithic paving and display area for birds, mid to late 20th century.
- Shed 2: Sawn hardwood and corrugated galvanised iron constructed for display of animals, late 20th century.

== Heritage listing ==
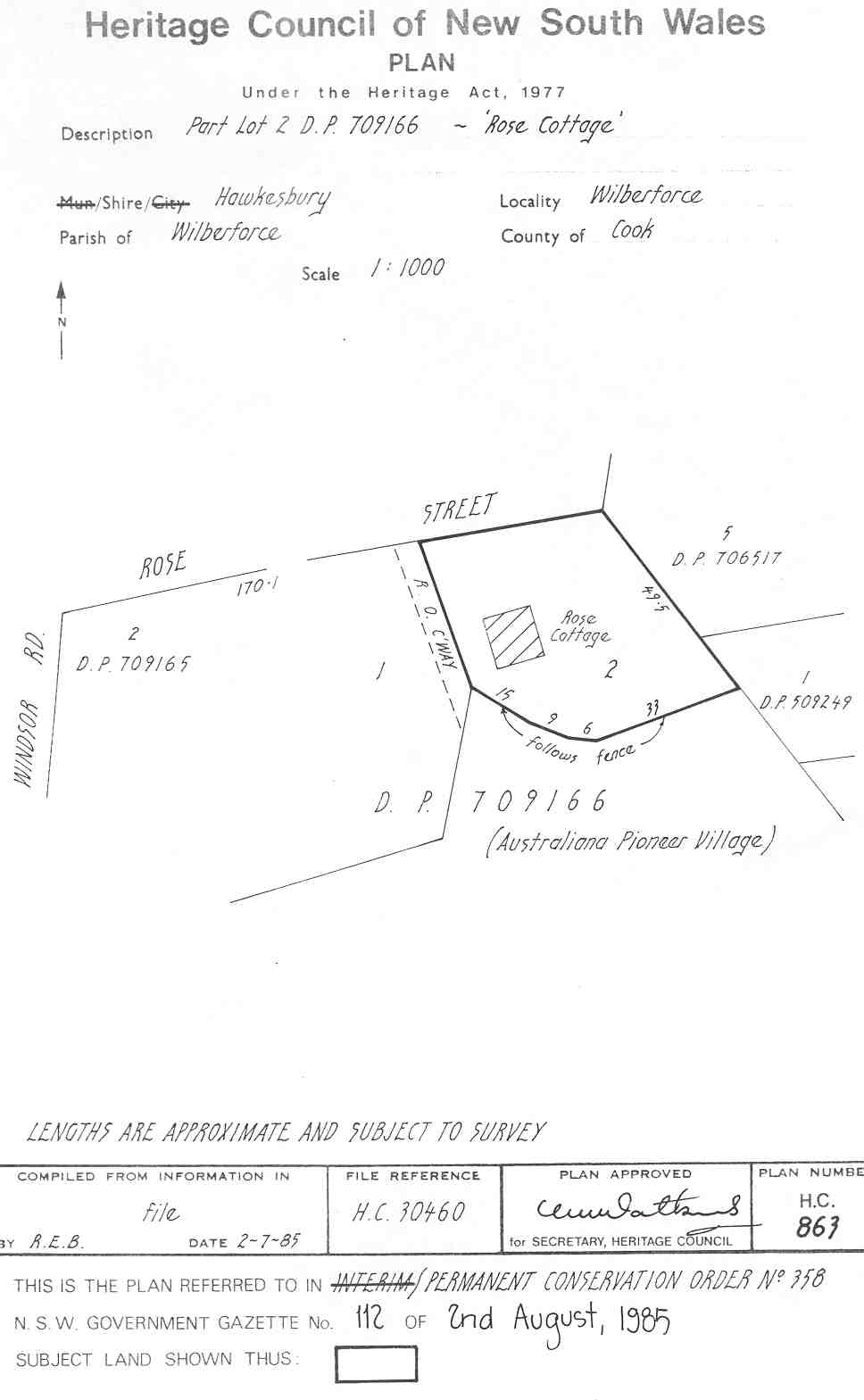
Heritage boundaries

Rose Cottage is an outstanding example of early 19th century timber slab / lath and plaster construction, most probably dating to the 1810s or 1820s, and inhabited by the Rose family, among the first free settlers to come to Australia, from its construction until 1961. The cottage has retained a visual relationship with the associated land, and provides an indication and is evocative of the nature of early farming settlements along the Hawkesbury River. The cottage is valued by the community as the oldest extant timber slab dwelling in Australia.

Rose Cottage was listed on the New South Wales State Heritage Register on 2 April 1999 having satisfied the following criteria.

The place is important in demonstrating the course, or pattern, of cultural or natural history in New South Wales.

Previous historical reports, heritage assessments, and media sources have reported that Rose Cottage is the oldest timber slab dwelling extant in its original location in Australia. The documentary evidence for the date of construction of Rose Cottage relies on two sources: as the cottage at least partly complies with Macquarie's 1810 promulgation on the dimensions of dwellings in the five Macquarie Towns, it is assumed that construction took place after 1810; and it is reported by Hawkesbury historian D. G. Bowd that the Wesleyan Methodist minister Samuel Leigh visited Rose Cottage in 1817. However, despite later research to confirm the citation of Samuel Leigh's visit to the cottage, no reference has been located. Additional research undertaken for this report also failed to locate positive documentary evidence of the existence of Rose Cottage any earlier than 1854 when Thomas II Rose made a devise in his will for his farm on Mackay's grant and the buildings thereon.

From the physical evidence it can be reasonably determined that the main part of the cottage (Spaces 1, 2, 5, 6, and the verandah) was constructed prior to 1820, indicated by the use of gudgeon hinges, the vertical timber slab construction technique, and the window sashes used in the front/north facade of the cottage. The skillion-roofed section containing the kitchen and a rear bedroom appears to be an early addition possibly dating to the 1830s.

While previous historical assessments may be inaccurate and much about the history of the place is still unknown, Rose Cottage, together with the associated land, is demonstrative of the form of rural development from the earliest period of settlement on the Hawkesbury River. No other similar examples of this age and retaining a relationship with the former farm lands are known from the Wilberforce area.

The associated land, comprising approximately 15 acres of William Mackay's 30 acre grant of 1794, was farmed by the Rose family from 1809, when Joshua Rose acquired the property, to 1961, when John Henry Rose died and the cottage and land were acquired by Bill McLachlan, founder of the Australiana Pioneer Village. Some aspects of the long-term land use of the place are still evident on the grounds of the Pioneer Village, including some mid-twentieth century fencing, the grove of eucalypts to the south of the cottage, and a line of trees marking the western boundary line of the farm.

Many settlers who received land grants in the initial settlement of the Hawkesbury vacated the land after the damaging floods of 1802 and 1806. In the case of the grant containing Rose Cottage, the land was subdivided in half in January 1806, creating two 15 acres farms. Later subdivisions within the Rose family were made through wills. In each subdivision, the new lots maintained direct access to the Hawkesbury River, creating long, narrow parcels.

Mackay's grant is among the first series of farm allotments made on the outskirts of Sydney. The subsequent subdivision of the grant took place very early in history of the site. While suburban subdivisions were made in the surrounding area during the later 20th century, the land at Rose Cottage remained relatively intact to its 1806 configuration, due to the long occupation of the Rose family and the formation of the Australiana Pioneer Village. This configuration is still evident in the cadastral layout of Rose Cottage and the associated land today, and is representative of the land subdivision patterns of the early 19th century as it took place in the area of Wilberforce.

After Bill McLachlan acquired Rose Cottage and the associated land in 1961, he set about obtaining much of the land contained in Mackay's 30 acre grant to establish the Australiana Pioneer Village. McLachlan transported other old buildings of many types to the site to create a heritage theme park, which opened in 1970.

The collection of heritage buildings, machinery, and other artefacts together into an open-air village-themed park was a trend of the 1970s and 1980s.

The place has a strong or special association with a person, or group of persons, of importance of cultural or natural history of New South Wales's history.

Rose Cottage is associated with the Rose family, who were among the first fifteen free settlers to arrive in Australia on the Bellona in 1793. Thomas Rose was an experienced farmer from Dorset, England who responded to the Government's incentive to attract settlers of a land grant, tools, provisions, and the service of convicts free of charge for two years. David Collins, in his assessment of the first group of free settlers said Thomas Rose was "the most respectable of these people, and apparently the best calculated for a bona-fide settler."

No other structures built by the first and second generations of the Rose family are known to survive; however, there is photographic evidence for the third generation Rose family cottage at Freemans Reach on the Hawkesbury.

Thomas' wife, Jane Rose, gave birth to a son six months after their arrival in the colony, the first free child born to free settlers in the colony. In the Sydney Gazette obituary for Jane Rose in 1828, it was noted that she was the first woman to attain the status of great-grandmother in the colony.

The Rose family continuously occupied Rose Cottage and farmed the associated land from 1809 until 1961. The associated of the family with the place is made more distinct by the survival of the dwelling, resulting in a significance that is rare state-wide.

The place is important in demonstrating aesthetic characteristics and/or a high degree of creative or technical achievement in New South Wales.

Apart from the lack of documentary evidence confirming the date of construction of Rose Cottage, the physical evidence suggests an early construction for the cottage, possibly in the 1810s or 1820s. There are numerous other timber slab structures in the Upper Hawkesbury district. Examples located near Rose Cottage include:

- 127 King Road, Wilberforce
- 87 King Road, Wilberforce

None of the extant timber slab dwellings have been assessed to be as old as Rose Cottage. However, the timber slab stables at the Macquarie Arms Inn, Windsor, are reputed to date to 1811-16. In view of this, Alan Roberts qualified in his 1982 report on Rose Cottage that it may be the oldest timber house (rather than building) surviving in Australia.

Other extant vernacular farm cottages from the early settlement of Australia's mainland include Cos's Cottage, Mulgoa (1811–16); Mountain View, Richmond (1812); Agnes Banks, near Richmond (c.1820); Bowman Cottage, Richmond (1819); Denbigh, Narellan (1817); Moxey's Farm, Richmond (c. 1820); and Cad-Die, Clarence Reach (c. 1820). However, none of these buildings consists of a timber slab structure, leaving Rose Cottage to be the only building of this type dating to the period of early settlement.

Rose Cottage is an outstanding, intact example of vernacular building technique of the early 19th century. Due to the continuing semi-rural character of the surrounding area, the setting of Rose cottage remains evocative of the history of farming represented by the presence of the cottage.

The nature of the relationship of the cottage with the associated land has been preserved due to the later sympathetic use of the land as the Australiana Pioneer Village. Some remnant features of the associated land probably date to the 20th century Rose family occupation of Rose Cottage, including fence lines and fences, a boundary line marked by trees, and the grove of eucalypts to the south of the cottage. The riverside vegetation, although none of it appears to be very old, reflects the 1803 promulgation by Governor King prohibiting the clearing of growth within ten metres of the river bank in order to curtail erosion.

The placehas strong or special association with a particular community or cultural group in New South Wales for social, cultural or spiritual reasons.

In 1975 two descendants of Thomas and Jane Rose, having researched much of the family's history and genealogy, established the Thomas and Jane Rose Family Society. The primary aims of the society were twofold: first, the conservation of Rose Cottage; second, publication of a published Rose family history and genealogy. The first Rose family reunion was held in 1982 and since then has been held triennially. The Society now numbers over 300 members and estimates that there are over 20,000 descendants of Thomas and Jane Rose identified through its genealogical research.

The descendants of Captain William Cox have a similar family society and Cox's Cottage is extant in the Mulgoa Valley; however, this family is more focused in the region of Mudgee. Therefore, the association of the Thomas & Jane Rose Family Society with Rose Cottage is considered to be of locally rare significance.

General community regard for Rose Cottage is also demonstrated by the number of heritage listings for it: Hawkesbury Local Environmental Plan, National Trust of Australia (NSW), NSW State Heritage Register and the Register of the National Estate.

The place has potential to yield information that will contribute to an understanding of the cultural or natural history of New South Wales.

The long span of occupation of Rose Cottage will have resulted in remnants of information now accessible through the archaeological record. The archaeology of the associated land and garden would primarily constitute an analysis of previous structures at the site, such as the outbuilding visible in the aerial photography to the southeast of the garden area and may also help to establish the nature of plantings and land use across the site. There is potential to yield more information about the history and use of c. 1810s farm properties in Australia in the early 19th century through archaeological investigation of crops, paddock boundaries, and drainage/irrigation systems.

There is also potential for occupational remains to be revealed in and around the cottage and outbuilding, as well as at the cistern located adjacent to the Heritage Hotel-Motel. The information would potentially be of particular interest because of the long occupation of the house by members of the one family.

As an intact, early example of a slab-built cottage, further investigation of the structure of Rose Cottage has the potential to reveal more information about timber construction methods of the period.
