= Rose Cottage =

Rose Cottage may refer to:

- Morgue (a euphemism)

== Australia ==
- Rose Cottage and Early Slab Hut, Werrington, City of Penrith, New South Wales
- Rose Cottage, Wilberforce, a heritage-listed former cottage in Wilberforce, City of Hawkesbury, New South Wales

== United Kingdom ==
- Rose Cottage, Sulby Road, Sulby, Isle of Man, one of Isle of Man's Registered Buildings
- Rose Cottage and The Sheiling, a pair of buildings in Luss, Argyll and Bute, Scotland
- Rose Cottage, Ruthin a Grade II-listed building in Ruthin, Denbighshire, Wales

== United States ==
- Rose Cottage (Pineville, Louisiana), listed on the National Register of Historic Places in Louisiana
- Rose Cottage/Peyton House, Charlottesville, Virginia, listed on the National Register of Historic Places in Charlottesville, Virginia
