= Australiana Pioneer Village =

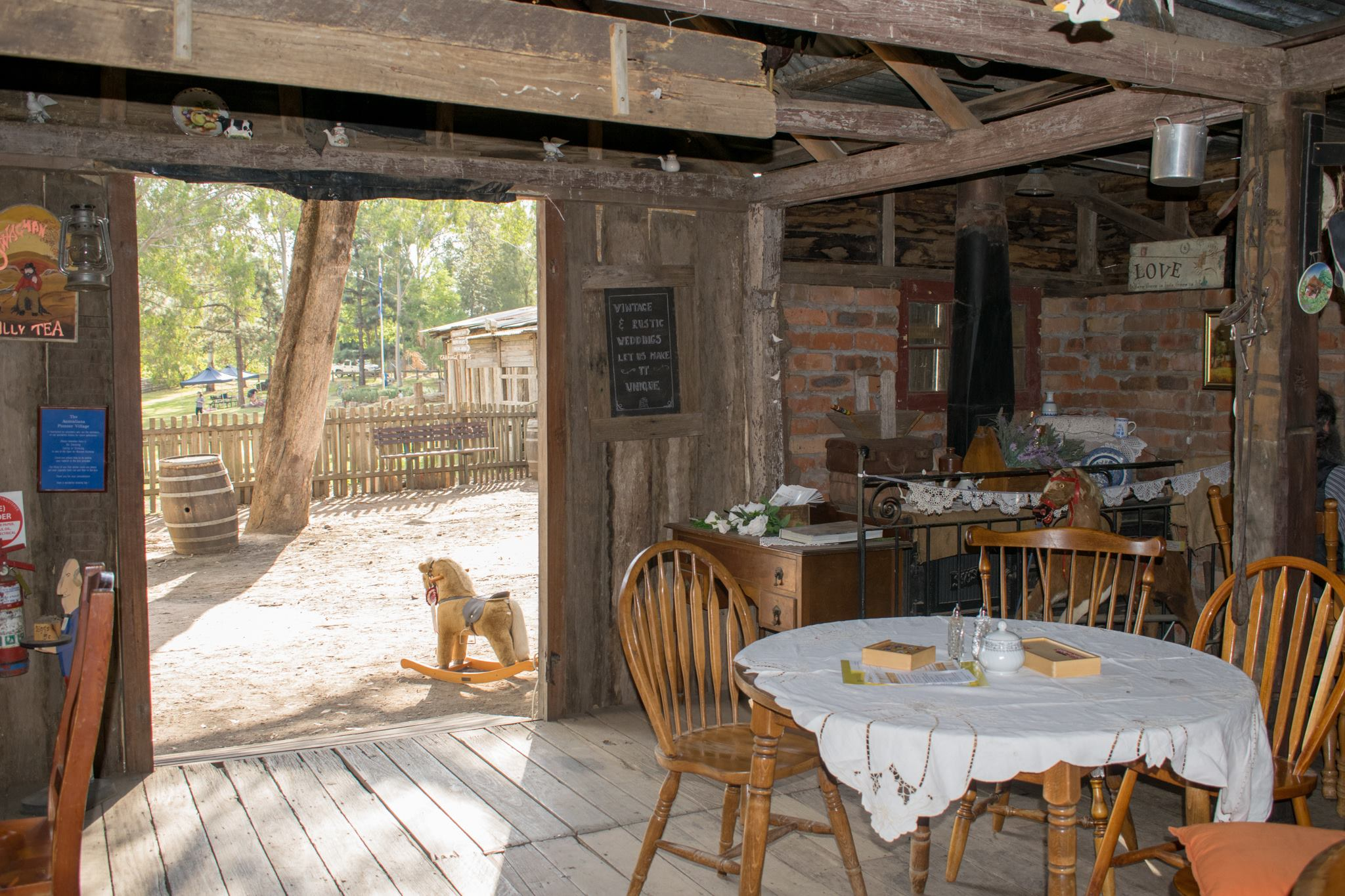
- Cafe at the Australiana Pioneer Village

- Location within New South Wales Location within Australia
- 33.5676°S 150.8404°E
- Location: Rose Street, Wilberforce, New South Wales, Australia

History
- Built: 1969–1970

Site notes
- Owner: Hawkesbury City Council

New South Wales Heritage Register
- Official name: Australiana Pioneer Village; Heritage Farm; Australian Pioneer Village Recreation and Animal Park; APV
- Type: state heritage (complex / group)
- Designated: 20 February 2004
- Reference no.: 1683
- Type: Tourist Attractions
- Category: Recreation and Entertainment

Australiana Pioneer Village is a heritage-listed open-air museum at Rose Street, Wilberforce, New South Wales, an outer suburb of Sydney, Australia. It was built from 1969 to 1970. The property is owned by the Hawkesbury City Council.

== History ==
The land on which Australiana Pioneer Village is situated was farmland recognised as essential to the survival of colonial New South Wales, being one of the earliest grants made in Australia. Located in the District of Mulgrave Place, the third mainland settlement of the colony, the 30 acre grant was registered to William MacKay on 1 May 1797, but by 1809 at least part of it was in the possession of Joshua Rose. John Rose, the final Rose descendant to live on the rich farmland after continuous occupation by the family for over 150 years, died only in 1961.

Upon John Rose's death, Dugald Andrew (Bill) McLachlan, a friend of Rose and an industrial chemist, bought the property. A man who relished challenges, whether competing in gruelling Australian car trials or being part of the 1940s group who pioneered water-skiing, Bill McLachlan fashioned a vision: to save part of the Hawkesbury's historical legacy, and to demonstrate its pioneering accomplishments

In an era before New South Wales heritage legislation such an enterprise had to be carried out privately, and resiting endangered buildings was one of few options open. It was a very natural option in the Hawkesbury district where there was, and still is, a long tradition of adaptation of buildings, both public and private, often involving reuse of materials or transfer complete to another site. By 1967 McLachlan had begun to plan a "Pioneer Village" of two streets, a water based leisure centre on his 250-metre water frontage to the Hawkesbury River and picnic facilities. Ready response from the owners of many buildings endangered in the district, meant that from the end of 1969 and throughout 1970 he engaged Silvio Biancotti of Kurrajong to bring by low loader to his "Village" twelve of the resited buildings together with the glasshouse. Many local families helped with the removals, which were all undertaken keeping the buildings structurally intact, and with their relocation on their planned sites. Brian Bushell of Wilberforce brought the small Bee House shop from McGraths Hill and others transported the Riverstone General Store and Jack Greentree's garage which became the "Bank of Australasia". On 29 November 1970 the Village was officially declared open by the Minister for Education, Eric Willis.

Bill McLachlan's early death at the age of 54 years in 1971, and the interment of his ashes near the church on the Village site, rallied continued support.

The last three buildings to be resited were the Riverstone Police Station (1972–73), Mangold Cottage (1985) and Aiken Hut (1984–85).

Arthur and Jean Mawson who ran a hotel on site, had joined Bill McLachlan to help finance the original village and continued to do so, bringing the Riverstone Police Station to the Village through Silvio Biancotti around 1972. The Village changed hands three times in quick succession, the first buyer a syndicate headed by Sydney solicitor Mr. Anthony Gye.

Hawkesbury City Council decided to buy Rose Cottage and the Australiana Pioneer Village (excluding the hotel/motel) in December 1984, paying $450,000 the following year, and subsequently the council did conservation work on the buildings. During council's ownership towards the end of the 1980s Mangold Cottage and Aiken Hut were added to the Village.

On 30 March 1989 a "Friends" Society was formed, the inaugural meeting attracting 24 members, increasing to almost 100 friends and workers by 1991. The Village was widely used by schools, local and overseas visitors, film crews, the community and businesses during the 1980s and 1990s. In April 1985 Grace Bros retailers hired the Village for their firm's 100 year celebrations. Nearly 10,000 employees and their families attended, hundreds of them being bussed from country centres as far flung as Tamworth and Dubbo. Australia Day celebrations, and Annual Bush Fire Brigade Field Days were held there (16). An award-winning heritage video made by Hawkesbury City Council was partly shot at the Village in 1994 and it was featured on Telstra's telephone book cover in 1998. In 1987 visitor numbers for that year reached 27, 572 with 164 school visits included. Articles praising Australiana Pioneer Village have been regularly published, including those in Woman's Day (16 June 1969), the Sun-Herald (30 August 1970 and 19 October 1986), Open Road (August 1988) and the Daily Telegraph (12 February 1997). Documentaries, films and advertisements have used Australiana Pioneer village, and the community have conducted market days there).

A name modification took place in 1993, the Village becoming the Australian Pioneer Village Recreation and Animal Park, with a management committee formed from a public meeting undertaking control of the Village. Additional initiatives included the planting of over 10,000 trees on the land by community groups.

From 4 January 1997 Council leased the property to Chris Wells, resulting in another name change to Heritage Farm. When the lease expired in 2002, Hawkesbury City Council agreed at its 11 February 2002 meeting to sell Australiana Pioneer Village to James Kelly, making no mention of its listing on the Hawkesbury Local Environment Plan or the heritage constraints necessary to the property. This decision was invalidated because the land on which the Australian Pioneer Village stands is zoned "community" and cannot be sold without being reclassified, which it then was. Subsequently, a third community group was formed to ensure the Australiana Pioneer Village remained a community asset and that its heritage and environmental integrity is retained.

The Australiana Pioneer Village was closed from 2002 until January 2011. In 2010, it was leased to The Australiana Pioneer Village Ltd, an organisation which had been set up to in 2002 to preserve the site as a community asset. The organisation were granted $100,000 towards the cost of repairs and it formally reopened on 26 January 2011.

=== Individual buildings ===
==== Buildings originally on site ====
===== Rose Cottage =====
This cottage and its curtilage were originally part of the land parcel Bill McLachlan purchased from John Rose and on which he constructed the Australiana Pioneer Village. It is an integral part of the Australiana Pioneer Village concept, but is now separately owned to the remainder of the village.

===== "Salter" Barn (formerly part of 498 Wilberforce Road, Wilberforce) =====
This barn is one of the three buildings still on their original site. It is known as the "Salter" barn after its early twentieth-century owners, but is of nineteenth-century style and was almost certainly built in the mid-Victorian period by the then owner, Richard William Cobcroft prior to his death in 1866, or by his widow and family in the period 1866 to c. 1890.

The Cobcrofts owned 6a 2r 19p, part of the 30 acres granted to William MacKay in 1797, until 1905 when Thomas J. Salter, a local man, bought the allotment. A Cobcroft building of the nineteenth century was close to the existing barn and its archaeological remains can be seen at 496 Wilberforce Road (on an empty paddock that today is part of the Australian Pioneer Village). Salter in 1905 bought a developed property which included Cobcroft's barn, and locals believe he almost at once built his own house, now 486 Wilberforce Road; while in 1909 Salter's son William built a second new house at 498 Wilberforce Road when he married a local Buttsworth girl, Minnie Christabel.

As a result, the Cobcroft barn became part of 498 Wilberforce Road and was closely associated with the Salter family from 1905 onwards. When 498 Wilberforce Road, like the Australiana Pioneer Village site was purchased by Bill McLachlan, founder of the Village, the barn became part of the Australiana Pioneer Village and remained so when 498 Wilberforce Road was sold independently.

===== Quilty Stables =====
The Quilty Stables were built sometime before the early 1980s for the 100 mile endurance horse race which started at the Village and went out through Colo and ended at the Village. The race attracted entrants from all over Australia was held in the district for some 10 years until tar roads became too hard for horses and its location was moved interstate. People like RM Williams were regular riders. Local State Emergency Services personnel were actively involved in operating the far flung check points and co-ordinating the incoming radio reports from each one.

==== Resited buildings ====
===== Stable from the Black Horse Inn, Richmond =====
Paul Randall became licensee of the Black Horse Inn on the SE corner of Windsor and Bosworth Streets, Richmond in 1819. Part of the Inn still stands on its original location, one of a select group of buildings erected in the Macquarie period that remain in the Hawkesbury. The date of construction for the stables is not known, but is certainly no later than the 1860s, since prior to the 1870s the Black Horse Inn was popular with honeymooners as a pre-Blue Mountains resort destination, reached by horse and carriage or train and sulky ride. During this period the Inn was also the finishing point of an early horse race track down the main street of Richmond. Indeed, it is said that the room on the end of the stables was supposed to have been used to lock up the jockeys before other such races to prevent bribing or interference.

The building and its stabling remained in situ after the Inn closed in 1927 when the licence was transferred to Kurrajong Heights; the stabling was resited to the Village in early 1970. It was moved in one piece, held together by ropes (3).

The sign of the Black Horse Inn painted by T. Masters and some china used there is now part of the collection at Hawkesbury Museum, Windsor.

===== Perry House, Richmond =====
This building was originally Samuel Paul's house and shop at Richmond. Samuel Paul, a skilled bootmaker and saddler, purchased the land in 1841 and had the building erected for his dwelling and shop by 1856, for when he moved to Bathurst that year his mother, sisters Elizabeth and Priscilla and her son Samuel Charles as well as the two little children of his older sister Martha continued living in the building, following the death of his father. In 1867 Samuel Paul sold the property to Alfred Perry who made it his residence and the premises for his tailoring business. Mr Perry later became an alderman on Richmond Council and the family continued to conduct the tailoring business until 1914. Mr Cahoon, a saddler, took over until 1927 when the premises are said to have become a brothel. Edward Sydney Paull [no connection to Samuel Paul] bought the property in the 1930s together with the adjoining premises to the West (now the Gazette office) where he conducted a grocery business, expanding that he ran in March Street in one of the cottages recently conserved as part of the Richmond Town Centre.

The building now at Australiana Pioneer Village was moved in one piece when Paulls sold the land for the building of the Magnolia Mall. The magnolia tree still growing at the front of the Mall, from which its name is taken, was planted by earlier resident Mr Perry. "Perry" House was moved to Australiana Pioneer Village in 1969 by Silvio Biancotti, the first building to be relocated there. The Paull family [no connection to Samuel Paul] bought the property years later and leased it out.

===== Atkin's Blacksmith's Shop, Wilberforce =====
Originally sited in Wilberforce on the south-west corner of the Putty Road and King Street, only a couple of hundred metres from its present relocation site, this blacksmith's shop was operated by George Atkins from 1862 when he rented it as a new shop from David Wenban, son of Wilberforce schoolmaster John Wenban. George Atkins, a blacksmith of exceptional ability, in 1874 invented the single furrow steel plough, which revolutionised Hawkesbury cropping. At the Sydney International Exhibition of 1879 he received a "commended" Award for his entries of a plough and scuffler. Atkins' single furrow plough was highly regarded and late in the nineteenth century there was scarcely a farm in the district that did not have an Atkins plough. George's son William and grandson William were blacksmiths in the same premises spanning over 80 years. When the business closed down in 1943. Of particular interest is the original stone quenching trough used by the Atkins family, located at the rear of the blacksmith's shop. An Atkins plough is on display in the Blacksmith's shop at the Australiana Pioneer Village today. This whole section of the original shop was moved intact to the Village in May 1970 by Silvio Biancotti.

===== Cartwright Cottage, East Kurrajong =====
This cottage was built in the 1870s at 927 East Kurrajong Road, East Kurrajong by Alfred Francis Case (b. 1847) a pioneer of Bull Ridge now East Kurrajong, for John Edward Cartwright (Mycock) and his wife, Julia Anne (née Riley), who is now referred to as "Old Granny Cartwright" by some members of the family. Her daughter Laura (b. 1899) later conducted a mail service from a room on the end of her verandah, walking to Comleroy to pick it up. If no mail arrived the sign on the door read "Sorry no male today". She is credited with being the owner of an early pistol licence which is still in the family today. Three Cartwrights who have Aboriginal ancestry born in Cartwright Cottage are alive today; Lorna, Gweneth and Fay. Cartwright Cottage was moved in one piece to the Village in 1970 by Silvio Biancotti.

===== Bowd's Sulky Shed, Wilberforce =====
This outbuilding was originally located only one hundred metres away from its resited location, on the property of the Bowd family adjacent to the Village in Rose Street Wilberforce. It stood in the paddock immediately behind the Village's present wagon shed having been built in 1874 by Edward Bowd, a descendant of William Bowd who arrived in the colony in 1816. Originally this was a two-storey barn with a skillion on one side. Also on the Bowd property originally but now demolished were a weatherboard house and another barn.

===== The Bee House, McGrath's Hill =====
Built at McGraths Hill c.1879 as part of a tearoom and shop complex, this building was used as a retail outlet for honey made from Box-Gum and from Patterson's Curse, now branded a weed but marketed as "Salvation Jane". This building was brought to the Australian Pioneer Village complete, around 1970 by Brian Buttsworth, Marj. Clarke's brother.

===== Mangold Cottage, Riverstone =====
This was built by Gottlieb Mangold (II) as a temporary home on the corner of Garfield Road West and Penprase Street, Riverstone for his family around 1886. It remained owned by the Mangold family until 1986 when it was resited at the Village. Gottlieb Mangold (I), his father, was a vine dresser in Germany who had emigrated to Australia with his wife Eva by the ship "Peru' arriving in May 1855. Gottlieb (II) was born in 1861. The family was living at South Creek, like another German vine dresser emigrant William Emert. Previously, the Mangold family, like that of William Emert had lived in Mulgoa possibly working for the Cox family. German families were in New South Wales by the 1850s for large landowners in the colony sought German expertise in their vineyards. Seventeen ships in that period had brought the Germans to the colony, most coming from Hamburg with up to 40 or 50 German vine dressers and their families aboard. Bill Mangold who offered the house to Hawkesbury City Council for the Australiana Pioneer Village building remembers living there as a child with his grandmother, Phoebe the wife of Gottlieb II, after his grandfather's death. He, his brother and sister remained at the house for two or three years, and the family at that time had associations with the Schofield's vineyard nearby. Later when he was married, Bill and his own family lived there whilst building their own home elsewhere in Riverstone. In 1983 a mini-cyclone tore off the roof and verandah, in which state it was sketched, as a vernacular building in danger of being lost by well known recorder of Sydney's slab building heritage, Daphne Kingston. Bill Mangold repaired the roof reusing the old iron where possible, so that only the front section had to be replaced with new iron.

===== Riverstone Police Station =====
Built by 1888, this small station originally was in Garfield Road Riverstone. It was a small wooden building measuring 10 feet by 8.5 feet by 10 feet, and would have been used for interviews and to allow the police officer to complete paperwork. It had no cells or holding facilities.

The district policeman was based at Rouse Hill and he used this building when in Riverstone. When a larger police station was built on the Riverstone site in 1891/92, the small original room continued as an office. The new station consisted of a house with cells at the back.

The location of the original Riverstone Police Station can be seen on a 1947 extension plan of the 1890s building and on a Department of Public Works plan of 1959, located at the front of the block facing Railway Terrace on the North-West side. It was relocated to Australiana Pioneer Village around 1972 or 1973 for Mawsons, the then owners, by Silvio Biancotti.

===== Case Cottage, East Kurrajong =====
Like Cartwright Cottage this dwelling at East Kurrajong Road, formerly known as Bull Ridge, East Kurrajong was built by a member of the Case family. Herbert James Case who built it, in 1896 at the time of his marriage to Catherine Hornery, was the son of Alfred Case (see Cartwrights Cottage). Herbert had been born at East Kurrajong, just down from the school and always lived in the district. He became a farmer, self-taught in building skills amongst a family who over two generations did most of the early building in East Kurrajong. This was not the only talent of Herbert, or indeed the Case family generally, for once a month Herbert and the family formed a band to enliven the district families' get-togethers. Herbert himself played the fiddle (which instrument is still in the Case family), and grandson Kelvin recalls the latter years in which dances were held there when he, as a small boy, saw Herbert's brother Jack play the concertina and his son Matthew play the accordion. The Case family's involvement in these entertainments was even more integral than providing the music for the dances, for they also provided the venue. Case Cottage, like some of the other cottages built by the family, was special in the district, purpose-built with a view to this community use, for the centre wall is completely removable so dances could be held in the small cottage. The signage used to advertise some dances was: 'Dance. All welcome Saturday 8pm till 2am. In Case Cottage at Bull Ridge. Dancing Free - Bring your own food basket and drinks, Good Dance Time Orchestra Herb Case Violin, Art Overton accordion. Best Square Dance and Buffet. Ladies without transport contact Mrs Jim Packer with her 4-wheel coach. Case Cottage was the third or fourth dwelling relocated to Australiana Pioneer Village being moved in March 1970 by Silvio Biancotti intact.

===== Riverstone General Store =====
Originally this building was a general store located on the southern side of Garfield Road, Riverstone approximately today where the Liquor Barn is now. It was built about 1890 and is probably the shop in which Norm Conway set up a hair-dressing business between 1914 and 1925. A Mr Edwards took over the lease followed a couple of years later by Tommy Freeman. The Blair family who took over the shop in 1929, conducted their fruit and vegetable business there for over 30 years. It closed in 1960. It was transferred to the Village as one of the original group of buildings acquired by Bill McLachlan in around 1969 having been empty for almost ten years.

===== St Matthew's Church, Upper Macdonald =====
St Matthew's Church, Upper Macdonald Road, Upper Macdonald was newly built on land donated by Edward Archer Bailey by May 1900 when the Bishop of Newcastle toured the St Albans parish and conducted on "afternoon services at the new church, Upper McDonald". The Bishop also conducted services at that time in St Philip's Church about twelve kilometres further north along Upper Macdonald Road. St Philip's Church is still extant and in use in the Upper Macdonald Valley but St Mathews ceased to operate sometime between 1952 and 1956, and was taken to Australiana Pioneer Village in 1970. Confusion seems to have existed in the labelling of this church at the APV with current signage still incorrectly proclaiming it to be St Philip's. Mrs Laurel Bailey, granddaughter of Edward A. Bailey, has Christening certificates for two of her children in 1948 and 1951 that confirm the resited church was indeed St Matthew's and believes the confusion arose because there was never any formal identification sign on the church during its use at Upper Macdonald between 1900 and 1951.

Edward A. Bailey died in 1921, leaving his property including the land on which the church was sited to his son Oscar Archer Bailey, Mrs Laurel Bailey's father.

The church had belonged at times to the Sydney Diocese and at others to the Newcastle Diocese. The last minister at the church, J. B. Neville lived in the Rectory at St. Albans and travelled between the four churches in the Macdonald Valley. On the 1st and 3rd Sundays he conducted services at the central St Albans Church on the 2nd and 4th Sundays he alternated morning and afternoon between St Mathew's Church and St Philip's churches, Upper Macdonald. On the fifth Sunday (when occurring) a service was held at the church on the Wollombi side of the St Albans Common.

===== Schoolhouse, Marsden Park =====
This building from Marsden Park was under construction in March 1889, having originally been suggested 1886, but not receiving recommendation until October 1888. The school opened in July 1889 with five boys and five girls as pupils but within four weeks the enrolment had risen to 18 boys and 9 girls, and by the end of 1889 it had an enrolment of 48 of whom 28 regularly attended.

The schoolroom plan is by W. E. Kemp, Architect and was designed as an 8th Class (small) school able to give accommodation for 40 pupils under the space formula of the revolutionary Public Instruction Act of 1880, at a cost of (£228.5.3).

The design of the Marsden Park Schoolhouse was so quintessentially official school design for the period that a sketch of this Marsden Park Schoolhouse was published in the annual report of the Minister of Education to Parliament in 1890, romanticised by curling smoke from the chimney and a sylvan landscape.

James Mackay an unmarried teacher in his thirties who had come from another small school as a half-time teacher there on the lower Hawkesbury River was the first teacher.

The building was resited at the Australiana Pioneer Village in 1969 by Silvio Biancotti the second building to be set up in the Village. It was transported in one piece except for the hat room, which was reattached at the Village.

===== Mitchell Cottage (originally called 'East Lynne'), North Richmond =====
Ern Mitchell built this dwelling in Crooked Lane, North Richmond around the mid to late 1890s. Like the previous generation of his family. Ern was a skilled bullock team driver, employed as a road builder and is credited with constructing the main streets of Richmond using his team and a single furrow plough. Ern was also involved in the 1908 resiting of a church to the corner of Comleroy and Single Ridge Roads, using a specially constructed dray drawn by 35 bullocks (3). This building was one of the early resitings carried out by Bill McLachlan for the opening of "the Village" in 1970 (4).

===== "Kenso" Cottage, Kogarah =====
Originally built between c. 1890 and 1920s in Ocean Street, Kogarah, this cottage was bought by Jack Griffiths, a Kensington dentist, and removed for him to Freemans Reach in 1950 or 1951 by Harvey Fotheringham who ran a fleet of trucks transporting market produce to Sydney. He brought the cottage back in sections: each wall, flooring, roof iron, rafters separately. Jack inherited the land at Freemans Reach from his brother Jerry Griffiths who had operated an orchard there. The loquat tree still growing at the front of the property was planted by Jack in the 1950s in front of his resited cottage. Jack became the local dentist which he visited his brother or resided in the cottage at Freemans Reach. Marj. Clarke recalls that Jack Griffiths came to her house, at Earle Street Wilberforce in 1943 to attend to her father's teeth in the dining room, while the Bushell children including Marj. watched.

The resiting of houses and other buildings into the district or within the district has a long tradition in the Hawkesbury area both before and after the formation of Australiana Pioneer village. "Kenso" cottage was moved intact to the Village by Silvio Biancotti in 1970.

===== George Hastwell's House and Sackville North Post Office =====
The house now on the Australiana Pioneer Village site was originally located on the south side of Sackville Ferry Road at Sackville North, immediately south-west of the still extant Sackville North School of Arts, built in 1914. For many years, until his death in 1943, George Hastwell a well-known resident of the area, lived there, certainly in the 1930s and probably much earlier in the century. The cottage, is believed by local people to date from the 1890s, a date consistent with its fabric. In the 1930s it was already "old and weather-beaten".

Hastwell was the contractor who boated children from their homes or across the Hawkesbury River to and from Sackville Reach (later Sackville North) School from 1905 until at least 1914. His handwriting and ability to compose letters show him a well-education man, while his character was vouched for by the Sackville Reach Schoolmaster, Mr Britten, who described him as "a thoroughly reliable and trustworthy person". Later Hastwell was the non-official postmaster for Sackville North, for an unknown number of years from at latest the 1930s up to his death in 1943 (1).

The post office at Sackville North had been conducted from 1906 until 1914 by the schoolmaster's wife, Mrs Britten. She initially operated from the school residence, now part of Brewongle Field Studies Centre, but between 1911 and 1914 her husband built a separate galvanised iron post office adjacent to the residence. Amy Munro, the wife of the next schoolmaster then became postmistress until her husband did in 1919 (Inspector, 6.6.1919, School Files). At some date after 1919 the small galvanised post office building was moved to behind the cottage on Sackville Ferry Road (2).

Hastwell became postmaster and is likely to have used this iron building initially, but in 1934 a new weatherboard post office room was added to the north-east side of his cottage by other Sackville residents, who had formed a Sackville North Post Office League, with R. T. Madden as secretary. This new post office 2.5 x 3.2 metres (8 by 10 feet), was described in 1955 as "alike to an old shed. It is of wooden structure, and lined with jute bagging .. it is a lock up building". This is the post office run by George Hastwell until 1943 and then by Miss Doris Alcorn, appointed postmistress in July 1943. Miss Alcorn, whose later married name was Mrs Noble, used the weatherboard building for postal business and for the sale of confectionary, tobacco and soft drinks. Later by 1955 she used the cottage as a tearoom.

The post office moved from Hastwell's former premises in 1956 to a new general store built in fibro-cement, also on Sackville Ferry Road, some 1650 metres to the north. The store-keeper cum postmaster was initially Ernest Buttfield from 1956 until 1957 and from 1963 until 1975 June Bonser ran the store and post office.

The Hastwell cottage and its adjoining 1934 weatherboard post office became derelict after 1956 and in 1970 both were moved to the Australian Pioneer Village. The post office still contained its pigeon holes and other postal equipment used in the time of George Hastwell and Doris Noble from 1934 to 1956.

===== Kurrajong Railway Goods Shed =====
This building stood cheek by jowl with the passenger station building on the Kurrajong railway station platform. The 1929 timetable shows a goods train ran separate to the passenger service each weekday, in addition to one mixed goods - passenger train, but these services operated for the entire 26 years of the line from 1926 to July 1952. Arthur Poole remembers the goods truck on the combined train was drawn from Kurrajong to Richmond by the steam engine "Pansy" where it was added to the goods train departing Richmond for Sydney, until after the second World War when road transportation became preferred.

In 1882 after almost twenty years of operation of the Blacktown to Richmond railway line, the residents of Kurrajong were agitating for the railway to be extended from Richmond to Kurrajong, thus, when the present North Richmond bridge was built in 1904 provision was made on it for a line to be added on the downstream side. Construction of the railway to Kurrajong commenced in 1923. Like the original line to Richmond, It was seen as primarily a way for farmers and orchardists to get their goods quickly to the Sydney markets.

Kurrajong Railway Station was located below Woodhill's Store, and was one of seven in the bush, on the track to Richmond (Kurrajong, Duffy's, Nurri, Thompson's Ridge, Kemsley's, Red Cutting, Phillip). The half hour trip to Richmond cost 1/- and the train would stop anywhere along the line boarding by a ladder lowered by the guard. Prospect County Council purchased Kurrajong station the site and built a sub-station on it. The concrete passenger station building stands at the Zig Zag Railway at whilst the wooden goods shed was taken to Australiana Pioneer Village by Silvio Biancotti in 1970 in one piece.

===== Bank of Australasia, Wilberforce =====
Originally this building stood on the NE corner of Rose Street and Wilberforce Street, Its contents were donated by the ANZ Bank. It was Jack Greentree's garage and was located straight across from the motel in Rose Street. Next door neighbour Aub Voller remembers it from the 1930s, but believes it could be older.

===== Aikin Hut, West Pennant Hills =====
This was the last slab hut remaining in West Pennant Hills when it was moved to the Village. It had originally been built by William Aikin to the north of present-day Aiken Road in 1875. The Aiken family descended from West-Indian John Aiken who had arrived in NSW in 1796, a free man who was a carpenter by trade. He rented a farm near Parramatta and applied for a grant in 1820, which resulted the following year in 30a in the Field of Mars being given to him, registered in 1831. He, his wife and children settled in West Pennant Hills as we now know the area, where John built a slab hut. His son William was killed in an accident in 1869, and 'William junior and brother Charles stayed on the farm with their mother and, when William married Elizabeth Bowerman, a local girl, in 1875, he built a slab hut on an acre of his mother's land and mainly worked on orchards in the district'. He died in 1933.

The area on which John's house was built was known as "Dixieland" a local reference to the Aikens (both John and probably his wife Francis) being coloured, probably from the West Indies and "Dixie Lane" is now Aiken Road.

== Description ==
The Australiana Pioneer Village is a museum comprising a collection of vernacular Australian buildings, most of which have a strong relationship to the Hawkesbury district.

The museum is located on a large site on the banks of the Hawkesbury River on the outskirts of Wilberforce. Rose Cottage, believed to be Australia's oldest surviving timber building, stands in its original location at the entry to the village. A row of relocated buildings, mostly small vernacular cottages line a "street" through the village leading to the relocated St Matthew's Church and Kurrajong railway station buildings. To the southwest is Salter's Barn, a nineteenth-century slab barn on its original site and a quintessential example of the tall slab barns of the region.

A number of buildings have been built on the site for various purposes associated with its use as a museum.

The Australiana Pioneer Village at Wilberforce contains numerous historic buildings both in their original location and resited from other locations.

Buildings in their original location include:

- Rose Cottage (1811)
- "Salter" Barn (1860-1890s)
- Quilty Stables (20th century)

Resited buildings include:

- Black Horse Inn Stables (c. 1819-1860s), formerly on the north-east corner of Bosworth & Windsor Streets, Richmond.
- Perry House (c. 1841 - pre-1856), formerly at 289 Windsor St, Richmond
- Atkin's Blacksmith Shop (1861–62), formerly at the south-west corner of Singleton and King Roads, Wilberforce
- Cartwright Cottage (c. 1870s), formerly at 927 East Kurrajong Road (corner Carinya Close), East Kurrajong
- Bowd's Sulky Shed (1874), formerly at Rose Street, Wilberforce
- The Bee House (c. 1879), formerly at 241 Windsor Road, McGraths Hill
- Mangold Cottage (1886), formerly at Lot 1, 10 Garfield Road West, Riverstone
- Riverstone Police Station (pre-1888), formerly at 18 Railway Terrace, Riverstone
- Case Cottage (c. 1896), formerly at 113 Bulls Ridge Road, East Kurrajong
- Riverstone General Store (c. 1890s), formerly at 36 Garfield Road, Riverstone
- St Matthew's Anglican Church (1899), formerly at Upper Macdonald Road, Upper Macdonald
- Marsden Park Public School (1899), formerly at Garfield Road (West), Marsden Park
- Mitchell Cottage (c. 1899, formerly at 193 Crooked Lane, North Richmond
- "Kenso" Cottage (c. 1890s - 1920s), formerly at 156 Freemans Reach Road, Freemans Reach, resited there from Ocean Road, Kogarah
- Hastwell's Residence and North Sackville Post Office (((circa)) 1890s), formerly at Sackville Ferry Road, North Sackville
- Kurrajong Railway Goods Shed (1926), formerly at corner Grose Vale and Old Bells Line Roads, Kurrajong
- Bank of Australasia (pre-1930s), formerly at north-east corner Rose Street and Wilberforce Road, Wilberforce
- Aiken Hut (1875), formerly at Hawkesbury-Aiken Road, West Pennant Hills

Replica constructions on site include:

- Buttsworth Road Gate House: Built as the entrance to the Village c.1986, this building depicts a drop slab structure.
- Oxboro Inn: A two-storey parapetted building constructed as a set for a commercial and remaining on the site.
- Shearing Shed: A slab building built for museum purposes.
- Smoke House: A circular building of timber slabs and bark built for the museum, a rare replica.
- Wagon Shed: A long skillion roofed building, built of timber poles with a corrugated roof for museum use.

=== Buildings originally on site ===
==== Rose Cottage ====
Rose Cottage is one of two nineteenth-century buildings on the wider site which is in its original location. It stands on the east side of the entry drive, but is no longer part of the Village itself. Rose Cottage is a single storey Colonial Georgian cottage with a steeply pitched roof. The roof is hipped at the west end and gabled at the east end. A verandah is on the north side, under the main roof with a slight change of pitch. A broader skillion is on the south side, again under the main roof but with a slight change of pitch.

The roof is of corrugated steel, with exposed battens at the ends indicating the original timber shingled roof.

The house has chamfered weatherboards to the gable end. Hardwood slabs are exposed on the east and west walls. Modern lapped boards clad the north front of the house.

The verandah is supported on stop chamfered rectangular posts and has a gravel floor.

The house has two corbelled brick chimneys.

3 over 6 pane (unequal sash) windows are either side of the central front door, 2 on the west side, 1 on the south side. The front door is ledged and sheeted.

A ledged and sheeted door gives access to the roof space from the east gable.

Internally, the main part of the house is divided into two rooms, with the rear skillion a single room.

==== "Salter" Barn ====
'Salter' Barn is the only nineteenth-century building on the site in its original location (not including Rose Cottage). The barn is of unusual interest as it appears to be an early slab barn of the district and is remarkably intact. The barn is single storey with a central space roofed with a steeply pitched gabled roof. Broad skillions on either side are broken back to the main roof. The roof is supported on closely spaced large timber posts. At the sides, the barn is divided into bays providing horse stalls on one side and storage on the other side. Joints are mortice and tenon or pegged. Storage spaces at the north end of the skillions are accessed by double doors across the skillions. The central space has a wide platform from which hay could be passed to the horse stalls. At the end of the space is a twentieth-century forge, with possibly a recycled air conditioning duct.

==== Quilty Stables ====
Quilty stables is a large building constructed of bush poles c. 1970s. It has in more recent years been clad with vertical boards.

==== Resited buildings ====
===== Black Horse Inn Stables =====
The Black Horse Inn Stables are a rare surviving Victorian (or earlier) timber stables. Further detailed investigation is warranted to determine the development of the building. The building is single storey built of vertical timber slabs with a hipped corrugated steel roof. The eaves are narrow and are boxed with beaded timber boards. On the left side of the front elevation, rough weatherboard cladding marks the jockey's room. A ledged and sheeted door and 4 pane casement window open to the room. The rest of the front has ledged and sheeted doors between timber slabs. Square timber dowels are used in the vent openings over the doors. A broad rear skillion was added after the stables were relocated to the museum.

===== Perry House =====
Perry House is a rare two-storey timber house of the mid-Victorian period. It is square in plan with a hipped corrugated steel roof. The house is clad with sawn splayed weatherboards to the sides and rear with some beaded boards to the front. The house is two rooms deep and two rooms wide. A verandah with an awning roof shelters the two front doors; one to the house and one to the shop. The entry to the house is through French doors; the entry to the shop is through a salvaged pair of two-panelled doors replacing the mid-twentieth-century glazed door which was on the building when it was transported to the museum. Both front doors have small toplights. The shop window on the right side of the front has 16 panes. The first floor has 2-over-2-pane double-hung windows, directly below the narrow eaves. A rear door is ledged and sheeted with 200 mm-wide boards. Six-pane casement windows open to the rear of the house. Internally, the house is lined with 200 mm beaded boards and timber boards salvaged from packing cases. The first-floor rooms have tent-form ceilings.

===== Atkin's Blacksmith Shop =====
This blacksmith shop is a larger gabled building with broad skillions on the front and back. The main gabled section is clad in corrugated steel; the skillions are clad with timber slabs and weatherboards. A vent in the corrugated steel roof provides ventilation for smoke. At the rear of the shop a sandstone trough for quenching the hot metal protrudes through the wall.

===== Cartwright Cottage =====
Cartwright Cottage is a hipped-roof cottage of wide (250–300 mm) slabs and a corrugated steel roof. The cottage is one room deep and has a skillion verandah, broken back to the main roof. The symmetrical front has a four-panelled door flanked by 2-over-2-pane double-hung windows. The ceiling is lined with calico. The main front room has no internal wall linings; masonite has been used in the bedroom. The cottage has a slab and tin chimney, lined internally with corrugated iron.

===== Bowd's Sulky Shed =====
This large gabled shed was once two storeys high. The upper storey was clad in weatherboards before this section was relocated to the museum. The main gable faces the front of the building. The roof is of corrugated steel and the walls are timber slabs. Reused 4 panelled doors are at the entry of the shed. A skillion has been added to the rear and the sides. The building is framed with square timber posts and saplings for the roof framing. An iron stove inside the building is from the Macquarie Arms Inn. Windows on the side wall appear to be salvaged.

===== The Bee House =====
The bee house is a small gabled freestanding shop building, probably dating from the late Victorian period. It has a medium pitched gable with a scalloped barge board facing the street. An awning roof over the entry is supported on gallows brackets and finished with a reproduction scalloped valance. A four panelled door on the right is the shop entry. Tall vertical windows divided by a mullion serve as the shop window. The shop is clad with splayed weatherboards and lined with fibro. A honey spinner once reported to be in the shop is missing.

===== Mangold Cottage =====
Mangold Cottage is a late Victorian slab cottage with a gabled roof and skillion verandahs (broken back to the main roof) to the front and back of the cottage. Sketches of the cottage on its original site by Daphne Kingston show the original front verandah as a bullnose. The roof is corrugated galvanized steel and the walls are of vertical slabs with tin strips covering the gaps between the slabs. The symmetrical front has a four panelled door flanked by 2 over 2 pane double hung windows. The original floor framing of this cottage appears to survive.

===== Riverstone Police Station =====
The police station is one of the most interesting buildings at the museum. It is a small building, square in plan, with a skillion verandah (broken back to the main roof) on the front. The roof is of corrugated galvanized steel and the walls are clad with rusticated weatherboards, probably an alteration during the 1920s while still in use as a police office.

On the left side of the building front is a framed and sheeted door with a toplight. To the right is a 6 over 6 pane double hung window. A window is at high level on the rear wall. Internally, the police office is lined with v-jointed boards. The building is a rare surviving nineteenth-century police office.

===== Case Cottage =====
Case Cottage is a late nineteenth-century hipped-roof cottage. One room deep, it has a bullnose verandah on the front which meets with the main roof. The roof is of corrugated steel and the walls are five-inch-wide sawn boards. 2 over 2 pane double-hung windows flank the central four-panelled door. The verandah is supported on stop-chamfered posts. The unique feature of Case Cottage is inside the cottage. The internal dividing wall can be removed to make a larger single space which served as the venue for local dances, with music being provided by the Case family, who made up the local band. The main room of the cottage has a pressed metal ceiling, and wall.

===== Riverstone General Store =====
The general store is a mid-Victorian commercial building which once stood in Riverstone. It is a single-storey building with a steep gable facing the street. A broad verandah provides shelter on the front of the building. Early photos thought to be of the shop suggest it was once at least two bays wide and has been reduced to the present single gable. The original shopfront survives and features a recessed entry, timber framing, with the shop windows divided into large vertical panes. Recessed panels are below the shopfront. The shop doors are a pair of French doors with 2 panes and small kick panels.

Internally, the shop is lined with wide beaded boards, except on the left side, where the v-jointed boards suggest the earlier extension to the side. The footpath outside the shop is flagged with bricks reportedly salvaged from a well. The verandah has timber posts with vertical grooves. A valance of pointed end boards is a partial reconstruction, the original verandah having a curved valance.

===== St Matthew's Anglican Church =====
St Matthew's Church from Upper Macdonald is a Federation carpenter gothic church. It is a simple gabled building with a gabled entry porch on one side. The church has a corrugated steel roof and splayed weatherboard cladding. The windows have pointed arched glazing divided into small panes inside rectangular openings. A four panel door to the porch has a toplight in a pointed arch opening. A tall window is in the end wall. A cross finial at one end has lost the cross member.

===== Marsden Park Public School =====
The public school is a two classroom school building of a pattern typical of the turn of the century. It has a gabled roof and a separate skillion roofed verandah, now enclosed. The roof is sheeted with corrugated steel and the building is clad with rusticated weatherboards. The gable ends are finished with a timber screen with narrow vertical slots. 6 over 6 pane double hung windows are at the ends of the classrooms and 3 pairs of double hung windows light each room. The enclosed verandah has 4 pane casement windows.

===== Mitchell Cottage =====
Mitchell Cottage is a two roomed gabled cottage of the late Victorian period. It has a medium pitched roof of corrugated galvanized steel with a verandah under a skillion roof (broken back to the main roof) on the front and rear. Timber posts at the corners of the cottage are the main structural supports, with vertical boards between. Modern timber battens externally cover the gaps between the slabs. The gable ends are clad with splayed weatherboards. The verandah structure is from the 1970s and the slab balustrade is probably more recent.

The cottage has double hung windows (not original) either side of the 4 panelled front door.

A brick chimney is external to the cottage on a side wall.

===== "Kenso" Cottage =====
'Kenso' Cottage is a long gabled cottage which appears to date from the 1920s. The main part of the cottage is one room deep, with a broad skillion at the rear providing additional accommodation. The front verandah is a skillion, separated from the main roof. Its structure and balustrade appear to be a reproduction by the museum. The cottage is clad with wide rusticated weatherboards. A high waisted door is on the right side of the front. Windows are paired casements. Internally the cottage has v-jointed boards and its original timber floor. Advertising signs painted on the gable and verandah end are associated with the museum.

===== Hastwell's Residence and North Sackville Post Office =====
The post office and residence is a rare example of a vernacular cottage adapted for use as a rural post office. The original cottage is a simple gabled building with a slab and tin chimney at one end. Double hung windows flank the ledged and sheeted door. The cottage is clad with splayed weatherboards. At the opposite end to the chimney, a wide skillion has been added to house the post office. It is clad with splayed weatherboards, narrower than those of the main cottage. The roof has a broad eave to provide some shelter to the counter opening at the end of the office. The counter is sealed with a boarded timber flap which is folded down when the office is open. The cottage is lined with jute bags.

===== Kurrajong Railway Goods Shed =====
The shed from Kurrajong Railway Goods Shed is a simple gabled railway shed enclosed at one end to provide a goods room. The roof is of corrugated steel and the walls to the goods room are clad in wide rusticated weatherboards. The shed is supported on timber posts. The gable is finished with plain barge boards. The valance has timber boards with mitred corners. A modern skillion on one side of the shed has been added to provide additional shelter for the railway in the museum.

===== 'Bank of Australasia' =====
The building presented as the "Bank of Australasia" is a simple gabled building, reportedly once used as a garage and relocated to the museum from a nearby site. It has a roof of corrugated steel, simple barge boards and splayed weatherboard cladding to the sides and rear, probably dating from the early twentieth century.

The front of the building has an arched 4 panelled door and large arched double-hung window. The front has a mixture of cladding including wider splayed weatherboards, and beaded boards, suggesting it has been made up of salvaged materials. The cladding in the gable matches that of the sides and rear. The building is lined with double v-jointed boards.

===== Aiken Hut =====
Aiken Hut is the only building in the group not associated with the Hawkesbury district. It is similar to the other vernacular cottages in the group in being a single storey two room cottage. It has a gabled roof of corrugated steel and a skillion verandah, broken back to the main roof. The walls of the cottage are of timber slabs. Tin strips to cover the gaps between the slabs were probably added by the museum. The verandah is supported on timber posts. The front door is ledged and sheeted. Casement windows either side of the door are not original to the building.

== Heritage listing ==
Australiana Pioneer Village [APV] is a rare example in New South Wales of the worldwide interest in the 1960s and 1970s in creating heritage places by transferring historic buildings from elsewhere to a single site for educational purposes. The high local value of the 18 individual buildings, 15 of them nineteenth-century which were re-erected at Australiana Pioneer Village, enhanced by a major Victorian barn in situ and by the adjacent Rose Cottage, a Macquarie-period slab cottage listed on the State Heritage Register, is transmuted into State significance because the whole is more important than the sum of its parts and the siting of the village is on the historic curtilage of Rose Cottage. All the buildings bodily transferred, without dismantling, were at risk and would certainly have been demolished over the last thirty years if not rescued: one had a history of relocation and the others meet the requirement of the 1999 Burra Charter's article 9 that removal "is the sole practical means of ensuring [their] survival", that removal should be "to an appropriate location" and that the items should be "given an appropriate use".

The village created in 1970 by the vision of one man has attracted fierce loyalties among the families originally associated with the buildings and among a wide range of people, local, national and international, who value the place for its educational and historical attributes.

The cross-section of rural life presented at Australiana Pioneer Village, including the cultural diversity, Aboriginal, Jamaican and German as well as Anglo-Celtic, represented in the origins of its component parts, has attracted an annual visitation exceeding 30,000 and has been successful with school groups from a wide catchment. As an open-air museum of buildings and activities associated with early Australian domestic life in the country and with rural trades and services, not available elsewhere in the state, APV has an important role at the state level. Unlike Lachlan Vintage Village at Forbes and Old Sydney Town at Somerton, hardly any of the buildings are reproduction and at Australiana Pioneer Village these original buildings are supported by associated artefacts in a major collection of provenanced moveable heritage. Australiana Pioneer Village demonstrates to a wide audience human activity that is in grave danger of being lost and is outstanding because of its integrity and the community esteem in which it is held.

Australiana Pioneer Village was listed on the New South Wales State Heritage Register on 20 February 2004 having satisfied the following criteria.

The place is important in demonstrating the course, or pattern, of cultural or natural history in New South Wales.

Australiana Pioneer Village (APV) consists of two buildings still on their original sites, eighteen buildings brought from elsewhere in the north-west sector of greater Sydney, five replica buildings and five supporting constructions, including toilets. The site is part of the original curtilage of Rose Cottage, a slab building of the Macquarie period already on the NSW State Heritage Register, which is immediately adjacent to APV but in the ownership of a separate private trust. Created in 1970 by the vision of a distinguished local sportsman and heritage enthusiast, Dugald (Bill) McLachlan, APV is a strikingly successful example of the genre, popular in the 1960s and 1970s, of creating artificial educational conglomerations of historic buildings removed from their original sites. Examples can be found in Britain, in many European countries and in the US, where they form a distinctive and often distinguished part of heritage presentation.

The removal of buildings from their context is, of course, now recognised as a second-best to their retention in situ, but the Burra Charter (article 9) specifically provides for removal if this is the only means of ensuring the survival of the structure. Removal does not extinguish heritage values, although these values are modified and changed by the act of removal and re-erection. In the case of APV, 18 out of 20 individual buildings with heritage significance had this significance modified by the act of removal, but few, if any, of them would have survived the last thirty years on their original sites: most were derelict and at grave risk when McLachlan acquired them around 1970. They were, moreover, moved intact to their new home at Wilberforce by low-loader, not dismantled and then reconstructed at APV, which enhances their degree of integrity. The act of removal of many of the buildings was documented on a film made by McLachlan and now available on video. The physical relocation of buildings for residential or other purposes generally has been a common feature of rural existence in the state for over a century. One of the houses in APV, moreover, the so-called "Kenso" cottage was itself originally built in Kogarah but was moved to Freemans Reach as a residence twenty years before it was finally transferred to Wilberforce.

The APV shows evidence of a wide range of significant human activity in rural Australia in Victorian times; is associated with significant activities on the land and with other provision of necessary services for farming communities in nineteenth-century Australia; and, not least, shows the continuity of the historical process of living on and with the land in one of the most significant cultural landscapes in the country.

The place has a strong or special association with a person, or group of persons, of importance of cultural or natural history of New South Wales's history.

APV was the creation of Dugald (Bill) McLachlan (1917–1971), an industrial chemist who has significance as a pioneer of water-skiing on the Hawkesbury, as well as some fame in car rallies. His knowledge of the old Hawkesbury families, in particular his friendship with the Rose family of Rose Cottage, was fundamental in the acquisition of the various threatened buildings which were transferred to the safekeeping of APV in 1969–70. McLachlan is of regional importance.

The place is important in demonstrating aesthetic characteristics and/or a high degree of creative or technical achievement in New South Wales.

Because the riverside site has preserved old trees, planted new native trees and has an attractive natural configuration, the buildings of APV are presented in a pleasing environment, consistent with the nature of predominantly wooden cottages and working premises. The wide dirt single street of the hamlet provides a telling vista of the principal structures and activities, framed by the wooden church at the south end. Signage is unobtrusive and necessary modern intrusions, such as toilets, are discreetly tucked away behind the street. Its present rather run-down condition is consistent with the nineteenth-century Hawkesbury.

The place has a strong or special association with a particular community or cultural group in New South Wales for social, cultural or spiritual reasons.

The APV has attracted loyalties both among the families originally connected with the buildings themselves and among a wide range of people who value the place for its educational and historical attribute. The Friends of Australiana Pioneer Village Society has since maintained the documentation of the village and its moveable heritage, in an attempt to preserve the values of the village from inadequacies of lessees and perceived failures by the Hawkesbury City Council, the owner since 1984.

Since many of the buildings were originally used by members of identifiable groups, including British free settlers and ex-convicts, Germans brought to Australia in the 1850s to practice their skills as vinedressers, Aboriginal people and a couple of Jamaican settlers, there is an ethnic dimension to the community interest. The village was visited by 30,000 people a year by the late 1980s and was particularly successful with school groups from a wide catchment. In its submission to the Tidy Towns Competition in 1989, the city council drew attention to the way in which the APV was attracting "a substantial tourist market including overseas, interstate and intrastate visitors, day trippers, the schools and social club markets, as well as families, local residents and bus and coach tours". Over the past 30 years, APV has featured in the national press from the Woman's Day to the Sun-Herald and the Open Road, was used by Telstra for the cover of the regional telephone directory in 1998 and has been featured in many television advertisements and documentaries. The community takes particular additional pride in the hire of the site by major retailing firms such as Grace Bros in its heyday for annual functions involving thousands of people from all over New South Wales, and in the use of APV for market-days on themes such as "renovation and home making", for the recurrent field days of the Bush-Fire Brigade and for Australia Day commemorations.

The place has potential to yield information that will contribute to an understanding of the cultural or natural history of New South Wales.

APV is an open-air museum of houses and other buildings, associated with early Australian domestic life in the country and with rural trades and services. As such it is a significant educational tool to provide insights and understanding into Australian history. Its utility to schools is outstanding and its ability to create awareness among the public at large is considerable. The cultural diversity exhibited by the history of the buildings adds substantially to its educational value. At the same time, the survival of these buildings and the research which they have prompted about their original location and the people who were associated with them has made possible on an ongoing basis the acquisition of new knowledge about the social and family history of ordinary rural Australians of the nineteenth and twentieth centuries. This gives APV an important role at the state level.

The place possesses uncommon, rare or endangered aspects of the cultural or natural history of New South Wales.

APV is rare as a single entity in the state: Wauchope Timbertown is more specialised; Old Sydney Town at Somerton is entirely reproduction; the Lachlan Vintage Village at Forbes is largely reproduction. The concentration of slab buildings in APV is unusual and as slab huts and slab barns are proving more and more vulnerable to destruction by neglect or ignorance throughout the state, this distinctive construction style at APV is becoming worryingly rare on country properties. The humble house is always likely to disappear more readily than the grand house and APV specialises in the humble.

The place is important in demonstrating the principal characteristics of a class of cultural or natural places/environments in New South Wales.

The twenty buildings at APV are representative of older rural life in New South Wales. The homes are a cross-section of the cottages occupied by many members of a farming community in the state in the nineteenth or early twentieth century, while the service buildings give a sampling of the everyday environment of a country village.
