= Macquarie Arms Inn =

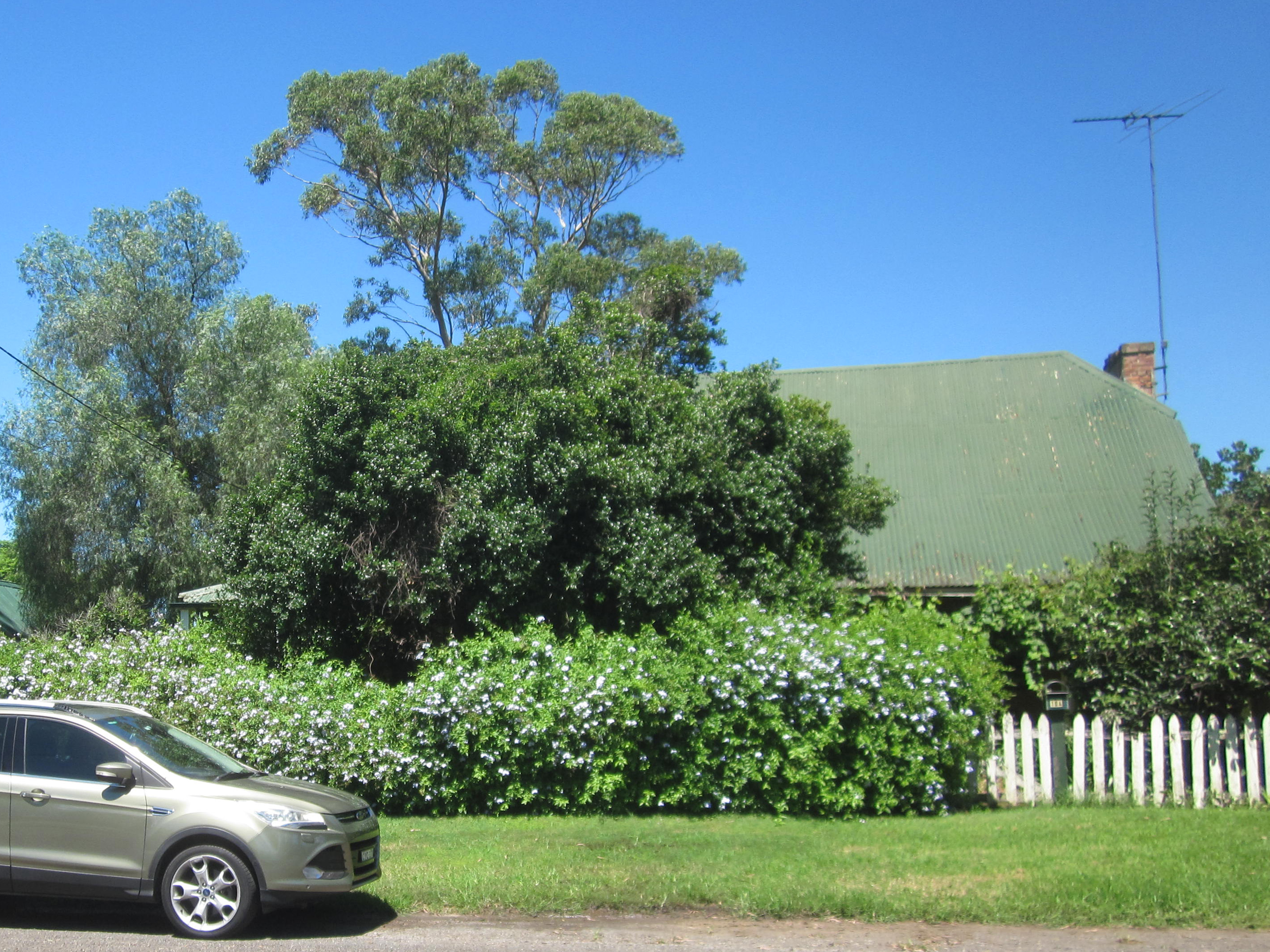
- Former Macquarie Arms Inn, Pitt Town, New South Wales

- Location within New South Wales Location within Australia
- 33.5858°S 150.8569°E
- Location: 104–106 Bathurst Street, Pitt Town, City of Hawkesbury, New South Wales, Australia

Site notes
- Owner: Paul & Elizabeth King

New South Wales Heritage Register
- Official name: Macquarie Arms Inn (former); Blighton Arms; Flemings Public House; Macquarie Arms Inn: Mulgrave Place
- Type: state heritage (built)
- Designated: 2 April 1999
- Reference no.: 282
- Type: Inn/Tavern
- Category: Commercial

Macquarie Arms Inn is a heritage-listed former inn and now residence at 104–106 Bathurst Street, Pitt Town, City of Hawkesbury, New South Wales, Australia. It was also known as the Blighton Arms and Flemings Public House in its time as an inn, while the main house on the property became known as Mulgrave Place. It was added to the New South Wales State Heritage Register on 2 April 1999.

== History ==
The lower Hawkesbury was home to the Dharug people. The proximity to the Nepean River and South Creek qualifies it as a key area for food resources for indigenous groups. The Dharug and Darkinjung people called the river Deerubbin and it was a vital source of food and transport.

Governor Arthur Phillip explored the local area in search of suitable agricultural land in 1789 and discovered and named the Hawkesbury River after Baron Hawkesbury. This region played a significant role in the early development of the colony with European settlers established here by 1794. Situated on fertile floodplains and well known for its abundant agriculture, Green Hills (as it was originally called) supported the colony through desperate times. However, frequent flooding meant that the farmers along the riverbanks were often ruined.

On 1 January 1810, Lachlan Macquarie replaced William Bligh as Governor of New South Wales. Under Macquarie's influence, the colony prospered. Macquarie's vision was for a free community of white people, working in conjunction with the penal colony. He implemented an unrivaled public works program, completing 265 public buildings, establishing new public amenities and improving existing services such as roads. Under his leadership Hawkesbury district thrived. On 6 December 1810, Macquarie recorded in his journal that on that day he had named what were to become the five Macquarie Towns in the Hawkesbury district. Following Macquarie's proclamation, Pitt Town became a more permanent township with streets and public buildings.

Henry Fleming arrived in Sydney on the third fleet, he was born as the ship, William and Ann entered Sydney Cove. His father was Joseph Fleming, a soldier in the NSW Corps, and when Joseph died, Henry was granted 30 acres of land in Pitt Town. Presumably he was granted the land now fronting Bathurst Street and set about building first a well, then a kitchen, followed by a barn and finally the main homestead.

Fleming operated the Blighton Arms, also known as Flemings Public House, on the site from 1816 until 1819 when his license was withdrawn for operating an "irregular and riotous house". There is some confusion as to which building this inn operated from. Possibly it was the kitchen block as a new brick building was offered for sale in 1820 and this was probably the present house. Others believe that the inn operated from the barn/stables building, explaining the unusual brick veneer walls to the northeast end of that building.

Fleming's brother-in-law, William Johnston was granted a new licence around 1830 for the Macquarie Arms Inn. Johnston's family purchased the property around 1840. By the time of William Johnston's death in the 1870s, the property was no longer used as an inn. Around that time the property became known as Mulgrave Place. Additions were made to the north of the main house around 1900.

Johnston's family retained the property until around 1920 when it was sold to the Greenwalls. The Greenwall family sold it to the present owners in 1982 at which time it was in a poor condition.

The Macquarie Arms today is the earliest surviving inn in Pitt Town.

The siting of the house at the edge of the ridge overlooking Pitt Town Bottoms is also of importance, taking advantage of the views to the Blue Mountains and reinforcing the relationship between the township and the lower farming land. Some of the early plantings on the site are important in adding to the setting of the building.

== Description ==
On this site there are four buildings: the main house/inn; a separate kitchen; stables/barn; and an early (c. 1805) brick cottage. There are also toilets, a brick well with a domed roof and original sandstone key cut cover.

The siting of the complex at the edge of the ridge overlooking Pitt Town Bottoms is also of importance, taking advantage of the views to the Blue Mountains and reinforcing the relationship between the township and the lower farming land.

Some of the early plantings on the site are important in adding to the setting of the building.

Inn

The main building is an important substantial jerkin-head roofed building with much of its original joinery and fabric intact. The inn building is single-storeyed with a long attic probably used for accommodation, survives in a dangerously derelict condition. The walls show a very interesting type of brick nogging, which may be later brick infill between the principal posts of an original slab building – it ought certainly to be thoroughly recorded. The cedar woodwork in the bar-room was removed in the 1970s.

Barn

The barn has brick-veneered slab walls and a jerkin-head roof.

Homestead

The much grander "Mulgrave Place" jerkin-head house on the same property is adjacent to the earlier c. 1815 cottage but certainly in existence in by 1823. It is parallel to the street. It is a double-storey homestead with a free-standing cellared kitchen. The kitchen has partly collapsed into the cellar.

The appearance of the house from Bathurst Street has been altered by the addition of a verandah in c. 1870, but the original house is of great importance. The upper storey seems to be largely unchanged from an early colonial date. The five upstairs rooms, which have no artificial lighting, use cedar throughout, one has a superb cedar ceiling, two more have painted wooden ceilings and the remainder have lathe-and -plaster. There are chair rails throughout, three of the doors lack, and have always lacked, handles;the hinges are clearly blacksmith- made.

== Heritage listing ==
The site of the Blighton Arms / Macquarie Arms Inn and Mulgrave Place is of high historical significance as it contains one of the oldest cottages (c. 1815), the earliest surviving inn (c. 1816/17) and an early house (pre 1823), kitchen block and stables/barn – one of the earliest building complexes in Pitt Town. It has all the hallmarks of one of the earliest developments after the moving (due to flooding) of the Pitt Town village in 1815.

First licensed in 1816, the inn was established in a converted end of a jerkin-head barn associated with the c. 1805 brick cottage. The inn operated as the Blighton Arms or Fleming's Public House (from c. 1816/17 until 1819, reopening as the Macquarie Arms from around 1830.

The site has strong associations with Henry Fleming, a third fleet convict and an early settler in the town who built the complex and operated an inn from the site from 1816 until 1819. It is also associated with his brother in law William Johnston, who operated the inn from around 1830 and whose family retained the property until the 1920s.

The site is of high aesthetic significance as one of the earliest surviving building complexes in Australia. The group comprises four main buildings: the main house, kitchen block, early brick cottage and the barn/stables building. Each of these can be considered to be of individual importance as surviving and substantially intact colonial buildings; as a group, their significance is substantial.

The main building is an important substantial jerkin-head roofed building with much of its original joinery and fabric intact. The barn/stables is a unique structure with its brick veneered slab walls and jerkin-head roof. The siting of the group at the edge of the ridge overlooking Pitt Town Bottoms is also of importance, taking advantage of the views to the Blue Mountains and reinforcing the relationship between the township and the lower farming land.

Macquarie Arms Inn was listed on the New South Wales State Heritage Register on 2 April 1999.
