= North Street residences =

- Location within New South Wales Location within Australia
- 33.6043°S 150.8266°E
- Location: North Street, Windsor, City of Hawkesbury, New South Wales, Australia

New South Wales Heritage Register
- Official name: House; part of North Street Group; Semi-detached cottage; Brick Semi-detached cottage; cottage
- Type: state heritage (built)
- Designated: 2 April 1999
- Reference no.: 107, 108, 109, 142, 150
- Type: House
- Category: Residential buildings (private)

The North Street residences are a group of individually heritage-listed residences in North Street, Windsor, City of Hawkesbury, New South Wales, Australia . It is also known as the North Street Group. The cottages were added to the New South Wales State Heritage Register on 2 April 1999. They are often grouped with the adjacent former Court House Hotel building. The residence, along with the hotel, had previously been listed both jointly and individually on the former Register of the National Estate on 21 March 1978.

== History ==
The lower Hawkesbury was home to the Dharug people. The proximity to the Nepean River and South Creek qualifies it as a key area for food resources for indigenous groups. The Dharug and Darkinjung people called the river Deerubbin and it was a vital source of food and transport.

Governor Arthur Phillip explored the local area in search of suitable agricultural land in 1789 and discovered and named the Hawkesbury River after Baron Hawkesbury. This region played a significant role in the early development of the colony with European settlers established here by 1794. Situated on fertile floodplains and well known for its abundant agriculture, Green Hills (as it was originally called) supported the colony through desperate times. However, frequent flooding meant that the farmers along the riverbanks were often ruined.

The first alienation of the land encompassed by the study area for European purposes was made on 19 November 1794. This was a grant of 30 acres made to Samuel Wilcox. The boundaries of the grant were from the banks of the Hawkesbury River halfway to South Creek with one corner of the land touching on the creek. He named his property Wilcox Farm; this name was specified on the deed of grant made by Francis Grose. Wilcox was given the property free of all taxes, fees and other charges for 10 years so long as he resided there and commenced to improve and cultivate the land. If he failed to do so within 5 years the land would revert to the Crown. As he was able to sell his property it infers that improvements were carried out on it although the nature, extent and location of these works are unknown.

At some time between 1794 and 1841 Wilcox sold his property to George Thomas Palmer, a gentleman of Parramatta. Palmer had arrived in NSW as a Lieutenant of the 61st Regiment but with permission to settle as a free immigrant. He served for a short time as Provost-Marshall and was appointed Superintendent of Government Stock in 1813. He resigned his position within a year and set up his home near Parramatta. He began to acquire extensive tracts of land around the settlement including 700 acres at Bringelly granted in 1812. He became a prominent member of the community serving on a number of public boards. He died in England in 1854. Palmer Street in the town of Windsor is named after him. Most likely, therefore, Palmer purchased Wilcox Farm after 1813 as well as substantial tracts surrounding it, over 1000 acres.

Although Palmer did not live at the Hawkesbury property it is clear from primary sources that this fertile tract was put to good use for cultivation. The plan prepared for the auction of the estate in the 1840s shows that the study area adjoined a large holding of fenced and cultivated paddocks, with ricks of hay then standing on them. There appear to have been several buildings associated with these paddocks. One of these structures, a small square building labelled "new hut", stood at the back of the later allotment 18, behind 37-39 North Street. This was labelled the "rick yard", that is, a storage yard associated with the fields nearby.

In 1841 Palmer sold a total of 1500 acres including the 30 acres of Wilcox Farm to Charles Campbell, a gentleman of Sydney. Campbell offered what was called the Peninsula Farm for sale as a subdivided estate in 1842. Lots along North Street being developed throughout the nineteenth century, likely primarily residential in nature. North Street was named for Lieutenant Samuel North.

=== 25 North Street ===
The allotments at 25 North Street (Lot 20 and 21) were purchased by Charles Campbell, who also owned the allotment at 23 North Street. In 1844, Lot 21 was sold to James Bell of North Richmond and Robert Stewart, a watchmaker of Windsor. At some stage between 1844 and 1865, Stewart came into sole possession of the property. A house largely built over Lot 21 was probably constructed during this period.

In 1884, the site was sold to James Ewing, whose wife was the daughter of Aquila Hagger, the owner of the adjoining property, and remained in the extended Ewing family's ownership until 1922. A survey plan in the 1930s shows only the house with no outbuildings elsewhere on the property.

The property was sold to the National Trust of Australia (NSW). The National Trust undertook renovations before selling the property back to private ownership.

=== 28 North Street ===
The early archival evidence for this property is very limited. The present house was built c. 1875 for the Tebbutt family, of Peninsula House and Tebbutt's Observatory. It later became the family home of the Mullinger family, and in 1987 was still held by a descendant.

Modern additions include a new two-storey sandstock brick garage (1988), in-ground swimming pool at rear (1993), and additions and the erection of a Victorian-style summer house near the pool (1997).

=== 29 North Street ===
In 1842, the site of 29 North Street was sold to Joseph Windred, who was responsible for the construction of the free-standing cottage on this allotment, probably in the early 1840s. The property was kept in the Windred family until 1872.

In 1873, the property was sold to Aquila Hagger, a farmer in Windsor. The property was kept in the Hagger family until 1960, and has had several changes of ownership since that time. A c. 1930s survey plan shows no outbuildings on the property at that time.

It was sold to the National Trust of Australia (NSW) in 1976. A c. 1977 survey plan shows some galvanised iron and wooden sheds behind the buildings including a garage added to the eastern boundary of the property.

The National Trust subsequently undertook renovations and sold the property back into private ownership.

=== 31–33 North Street ===
In 1843, the site of 31–33 North Street was purchased by John Shearing, who had already purchased both 35 North Street and the Court House Hotel site at 37–39 North Street in 1842.

The present building was constructed in the 1840s, possibly as an inn, but more likely as an adjunct to the Court House Inn, given that the inn was in operation one door away. The property remained in the Shearing family until 1862.

31–33 North Street was sold to Richard Seymour, a saddle and harness maker/tanner of Windsor, in 1862. At the same time Seymour purchased 35 North Street.

Both properties at 31–33 North Street and 35 North Street were sold to John Dunstan, a farmer in Wilberforce, in 1870. 31–33 North Street remained in the Dunstan extended family until 1900.

It was sold to Thomas Barter in 1900. The property remained in the extended Barter family until 1964, when it was sold to John Molloy. It was sold again in 1981.

The National Trust of Australia (NSW) classified the property in 1976.

=== 35 North Street ===
The land adjoining the former Court House Hotel was part of that property (37-39 North Street) until 1863, owned by John Shearing, then shopkeeper Uriah Moses, and then again by the Shearing family.

The cottage was constructed probably c. 1860s, although it is possible it pre-dates this time, by Richard Seymour, who purchased the land from the Shearing family.)

In 1870, the property was sold to John Dunstan, a farmer in Wilberforce. Dunstan also purchased the adjoining property at 31-33 North Street at this time. 35 North Street remained in the Dunstan extended family until 1952, continuously being used as a residential property.

A survey plan c. 1930s shows no outbuildings on the property at that time. Another survey plan c. 1977 shows some galvanised iron and wooden sheds behind the buildings including a garage added to the eastern boundary of the property.

In 1976, the property was sold to the National Trust of Australia (NSW). An old timber building was relocated and rebuilt in the yard of this property on its eastern boundary sometime after 1978. The National Trust undertook repairs and renovations, before selling the property back into private ownership.

== Description ==
The residences are located on the northern side of North Street between the intersection of this street with Arndell and Palmer Streets. The buildings follow the topography of North Street, which drops from the highest point at the western end (37-39 North Street) to the lowest level in the study area at the east (23 North Street). There is also a slope from north to south.

The facades of the nineteenth century buildings are in a similar alignment along North Street and are sited close to the present street separated from it only by a narrow grassed footpath. All of the properties have substantial trees behind them and all have landscaped gardens in the immediate environs of the houses.

25 North Street comprises semi-detached cottages with two front doors now used as a single occupancy house. It is built from sandstock brick above a sandstone cellar and foundations. The verandah paving and sills are also formed from sandstone. There are twelve-pane window sashes and six-panel doors. There is a jerkin head roof with dormer windows. It is hipped to the verandah. The centrally placed chimney reflects the two former occupancies. There are out-buildings behind.

28 North Street is a formal single-storey brick house set back from the street. It has a wide returning verandah with cast iron open columns and valance, and French windows opening from inside with long louvered shutters. The high central chimney crowning the roof emphasises the formality of the design.

29 North Street is a free-standing sandstock brick cottage. It has sandstone foundations, lintels and sills. Windows are twelve-pane and doors are four-panel. The roof is covered in iron and is hipped to house and bellcast to the timber verandah. This has a timber picket fence.

31–33 North Street is built from sandstock brick. The walls rest on stone foundations. There is also a stone-paved verandah that is edged with a picket fence. The house has a hipped iron roof. There are twelve-pane windows and glazed French doors.

35 North Street is a single storey timber house that has as its western wall the brick wall of the adjoining 37-39 North Street. It has a rusticated boarded front, four-pane windows and four-panel doors. It has a simple pitched roof with curved iron sheets covering the verandah. The latter is edged with a picket fence. A weatherboard extension has been made to the back of the building. There is a large timber outbuilding that has been imported to the site.
