= Bird In The Hand Inn =

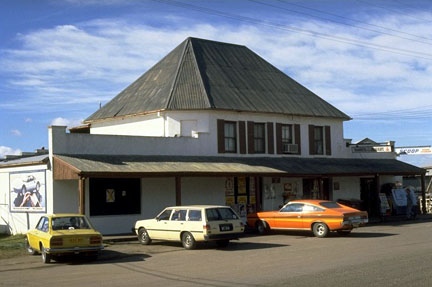
- The building c. 1981

- Location within New South Wales Location within Australia
- 33.5863°S 150.8593°E
- Location: 87 Eldon Street, Pitt Town, City of Hawkesbury, New South Wales, Australia

New South Wales Heritage Register
- Official name: Bird In The Hand Inn (former); Bird In The Hand Inn
- Type: state heritage (built)
- Designated: 2 April 1999
- Reference no.: 373
- Type: Inn/Tavern
- Category: Commercial

Bird In The Hand Inn is a heritage-listed inn at 87 Eldon Street, Pitt Town, New South Wales, an outer suburb of Sydney Australia. It is also known as the Maid of Australia Inn, It was added to the New South Wales State Heritage Register on 2 April 1999.

== History ==
The original Bird in Hand Inn was built opposite the current location in Bathurst Street in 1825. It was originally known as the Bird in the Hand, with Daniel Smallwood as the first licensee. George Buckridge took over the license soon after but following his death in 1843, the license went to Elizabeth. The 1827 and later 1841 detailed surveys of Pitt Town show the present site of the inn as vacant land, evidencing that the present building was constructed sometime after 1841 and likely in the late 1840s. Buckridge was succeeded by Richard Mawson in the 1850s. Mawson renamed the inn the Maid of Australia in the same era. It retained the Maid of Australia name until its closure in 1896 when it became a general store. It was restored in 1986 and by 1987, works were complete.

It reopened as a hotel under its original name that same year. Most recently, a gaming room was added to the eastern end of the hotel in 2020.

== Description ==
The Bird in Hand Inn is a very important Colonial Georgian inn prominently located in the centre of the village at Pitt Town. It is a two-storey four bay sandstock brick building with one angled corner wall, having a distinctive steeply pitched hipped iron roof. The walls of the inn are rendered and coursed in ashlar. The front wall of the inn has been extended in each direction as a single storey parapet. A seven bay skillion verandah runs the full length of the facade and along parapet side walls, timber posts rest on a flagstone floor. Replacement ground floor windows match the original upper storey windows. A two-storey wing, mimicking the scale and form of the original is located to the rear (northeast) of the original block and connected two it by a narrower two storey link.

The building was restored throughout in the late 1980s, with obtrusive accretions removed and a large two-storey addition with beer garden and skillion verandah. The Pitt Town Village shopping complex is located adjacent: this is a Georgian-styled part single and part two-storey commercial development which is in keeping with the architectural language of the original inn.

== Significance ==
The Bird in Hand Inn is of high historical significance as the earliest inn in Pitt Town. The inn is important for its association with Daniel Smallwood, a prominent pioneer of the town, who built the inn in 1825 and operated it until 1840.

It is an important surviving example of a Georgian Colonial inn. While there are similar buildings surviving such as 265 George Street and the former Bell Inn, this style of building is becoming increasingly rare.

The location of the Bird in Hand at the centre of the village of Pitt Town and on the prominent corner of Bathurst Street and Eldon Street makes it an important landmark in the village. Its steeply pitched roof makes it a landmark in the approach to the town. Its importance has been underlined by the construction of the commercial precinct of the village adjacent.

The importance of the inn as a centre for social activity in the town has been continued in the recent years by its reuse as part of the commercial centre of the village.

As the oldest inn in Pitt Town, the former Bird in Hand clearly has some archaeological potential.

== Heritage listing ==
Bird In The Hand Inn was listed on the former Register of the National Estate on 14 May 1991 and on the New South Wales State Heritage Register on 2 April 1999.
