= Court House Hotel, Windsor =

Court House Hotel
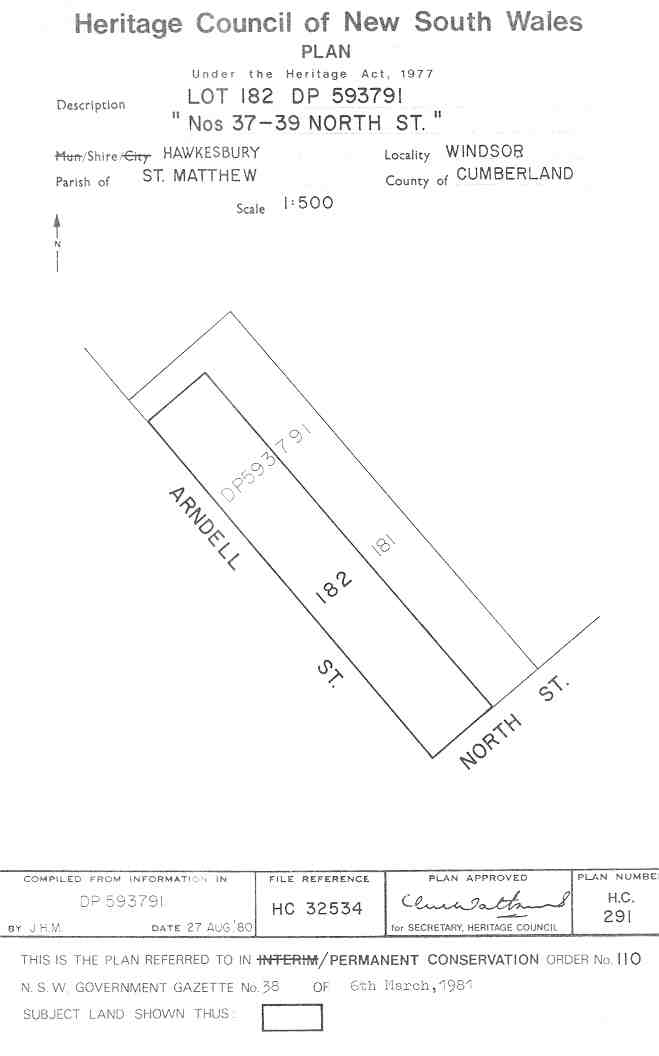
- Heritage boundaries

- Location within Sydney Location within Australia
- 33°36′17″S 150°49′34″E
- Location: 37–39 North Street, Windsor, City of Hawkesbury, New South Wales, Australia

New South Wales Heritage Register
- Official name: Houses; two-storey sandstock bricks building; Peninsula Hotel; Court House Hotel; former inn
- Type: State heritage (built)
- Designated: 2 April 1999
- Reference no.: 110
- Type: House
- Category: Residential buildings (private)

Court House Hotel is a heritage-listed former hotel and now residence at 37–39 North Street, Windsor, New South Wales, on the urban fringe of Sydney, Australia. It was added to the New South Wales State Heritage Register on 2 April 1999. It is often associated with the adjoining North Street residences, some of which shared ownership with the hotel at various times.

== History ==
=== Indigenous history ===
The lower Hawkesbury was home to the Dharug people. The proximity to the Nepean River and South Creek qualifies it as a key area for food resources for indigenous groups. The Dharug and Darkinjung people called the river Deerubbin and it was a vital source of food and transport.

=== Colonial history ===
Governor Arthur Phillip explored the local area in search of suitable agricultural land in 1789 and discovered and named the Hawkesbury River after Baron Hawkesbury. This region played a significant role in the early development of the colony with European settlers established here by 1794. Situated on fertile floodplains and well known for its abundant agriculture, Green Hills (as it was originally called) supported the colony through desperate times. However, frequent flooding meant that the farmers along the riverbanks were often ruined.

In 1794, the land on which the building now stands was first alienated for European purposes in a grant made by Francis Grose of thirty acres to Samuel Wilcox, who named it Wilcox Farm. It is likely that land clearance and agricultural activities as well as some building works took place during this period and during the subsequent of occupation. The former Wilcox Farm was incorporated into a larger holding of 1500 acres known as Peninsula Farm in the early nineteenth century.

Governor Lachlan Macquarie replaced Governor Bligh, taking up duty on 1 January 1810. Under his influence the colony prospered. His vision was for a free community, working in conjunction with the penal colony. He implemented an unrivalled public works program, completing 265 public buildings, establishing new public amenities and improving existing services such as roads. Under his leadership Hawkesbury district thrived. He visited the district on his first tour and recorded in his journal on 6 December 1810: "After dinner I chrestened the new townships...I gave the name of Windsor to the town intended to be erected in the district of the Green Hills...the township in the Richmond district I have named Richmond..." the district reminded Macquarie of those towns in England, whilst Castlereagh, Pitt Town and Wilberforce were named after English statesmen. These are often referred to as Macquarie's Five Towns. Their localities, chiefly Windsor and Richmond, became more permanent with streets, town square and public buildings.

=== History of the Court House Hotel ===
In the 1840s a plan prepared for the auction of Peninsula Farm estate shows that the study area adjoined a large holding of fenced and cultivated paddocks, with ricks of hay standing on them. There appear to have been several buildings associated with these paddocks. One of these structures, a small square building labelled "new hut", stood at the back of the later allotment 18, behind 37-39 North Street. This was labelled the "rick yard", that is, a storage yard associated with the fields near-by. The Peninsula Farm was subdivided, with lots along North Street, Windsor, being developed throughout the nineteenth century (North Street named for Lieutenant Samuel North). It is likely this development was primarily residential in nature. 37-39 North Street was Allotment 18 of the Peninsula Farm Subdivision and was owned by Charles Campbell.

In 1842, Allotment 18 was purchased by John Shearing. He also purchased the adjoining 35 North Street in 1842 and 31-33 North Street (see North Street residences) in 1843. The current building was built by Shearing between 1842 and 1846. The early use of the building is less well documented, though numerous sources report that it was built and/or operated as the Peninsula Hotel. In 1846, Shearing sold the property to Uriah Moses, a shopkeeper.

In 1846–1848, a publican's license was granted for the Court House Hotel, named for its proximity to the nearby Windsor Court House.

In 1861, after further changes of ownership, the property was sold to Thomas Chaseling, who used it as a private residence for some time. In November 1867, James Reardon held a publican's licence for the hotel. In the 1870s, the property possibly reverted to use as a public house, as it was reported to have been kept by Robert Leddra as the Court House Hotel in 1877. During the 1880s, the building was used by a private school.

In the early twentieth century, the building is said to have been divided in half with a family in each half. In 1922, Thomas Chaseling willed the properties at 37-39 and 35 North Street to Thomasina Smith. Around c. 1930 a Windsor drainage plan shows what may have been a small double earth closest or privy on the back, northern fence line and another small building on the boundary with 35 North Street. In 1945, Thomasina Smith willed the properties to her five daughters, who subsequently sold them to Thelma Mullinger where they stayed in the ownership of the Mullinger family for many years.

In 1974, the properties at 37-39 and 35 North Street were sold to John Fisher, who sold the properties one month later to the National Trust of Australia (NSW). The National Trust of Australia (NSW) classified the property in 1976 and undertook substantial repairs and renovations returning what had been subdivided into two flats to a single dwelling. The small double earth closest or privy on the back, northern fence line and another small building on the boundary with 35 North Street, present in the 1930s, were demolished by 1978 when a survey shows only a "rough timber shed" at the back of the property.

The building appeared in television drama A Country Practice in the opening credits as the surgery of Dr Terrence Elliott.

The former hotel building was subsequently sold back into private ownership.

== Description ==
37–39 North Street is a two-storey building constructed from sandstock bricks with sandstone lintels, sills and verandah flagging. There is a cellar beneath the house. It has a number of out-buildings.

Along with the North Street residences, the facades of the nineteenth century buildings are in a similar alignment along North Street and are sited close to the present street separated from it only by a narrow grassed footpath. All of the properties have substantial trees behind them and all have landscaped gardens in the immediate environs of the houses.

An archaeological assessment has found that the site is "likely to encompass evidence that could relate to secondary buildings, yard and garden improvements, services and/or domestic wastes of approximately the mid-nineteenth century onwards", but unlikely that it will yield evidence from earlier than that date.

== Heritage listing ==
The Court House Hotel was listed on the New South Wales State Heritage Register on 2 April 1999.

== See also ==
- List of pubs in Australia
