= Pitt Town =

- Suburb
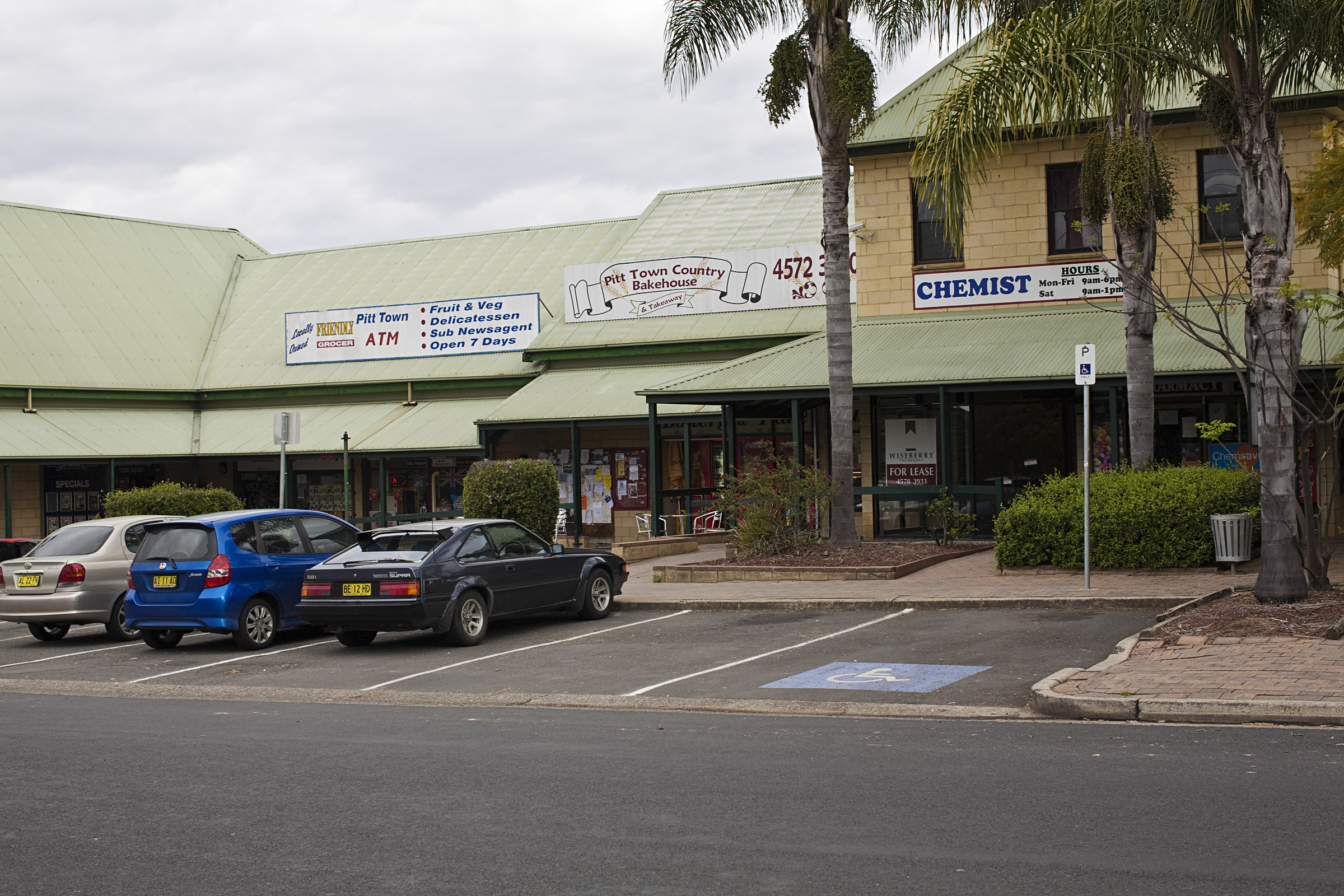
- Pitt Town Shopping Mall

- Interactive map of Pitt Town
- Country: Australia
- State: New South Wales
- LGA: City of Hawkesbury
- Location: 59 km (37 mi) from Sydney CBD; 36 km (22 mi) from Parramatta CBD; 9 km (5.6 mi) from Windsor, New South Wales
- Established: 1810

Government
  - State electorate: Hawkesbury
  - Federal division: Macquarie
- Elevation: 17 m (56 ft)

Population
  - Total: 3,871 (2021 census)
- Postcode: 2756
Suburbs around Pitt Town
Wilberforce	Wilberforce	Cattai
Freemans Reach	Pitt Town	Maraylya
Pitt Town Bottoms	McGraths Hill	Oakville

Pitt Town is a historic town and suburb of Sydney, in the state of New South Wales, Australia. Pitt Town is 59 kilometres north-west of the Sydney central business district in the local government area of the City of Hawkesbury. It is bounded in the north by the Hawkesbury River.

== History ==
=== Settlement ===
European settlement in Pitt Town began from 1791 when Governor Arthur Phillip camped in the area, with a number of land grants being given in the following year along the river front in what is now known as Pitt Town Bottoms. Some of the earliest land holders included James Ruse. Pitt Town is one of the five "Macquarie Towns" established by Governor Macquarie in 1810. It is named after William Pitt the Younger, the 18th Century British Prime Minister who is responsible for initially planning the colonisation of New South Wales as a penal settlement. After the townships were christened by Lachlan Macquarie at a dinner in December 1810 at Government House, Windsor, a site for a village was laid out in early 1811 but developed very slowly, largely because of the distance from the river front and the settled farms. Consequently, Governor Macquarie returned to the area and together with Surveyor James Meehan, resurveyed the area to mark out a new location for the township. In October 1815, Macquarie issued orders via the Sydney Gazette that the town was to be relocated to its present location, with land grants in the new (present) township being given to the settlers from November 1815. By 1841 there were only 36 houses in the town, still largely due to its location being too far from the rich river flats and the consequent long daily trek for farmers to their holdings.

The street names of Pitt Town bear testament to the 1808 British Cabinet, including Eldon, Grenville, Bathurst, Liverpool, Buckingham, Chatham, and Chandos Streets. Chandos Street was later renamed Church Street.

Electricity first came to Pitt Town in 1935, with the township being connected to town water supply in the early 1940s as evidenced by the large water tower that stood in Hall Street until 2019 when it was decommissioned and demolished by Sydney Water.

Pitt Town was the site of the first use of agricultural irrigation in Australia, when Pitt Town pioneer Lawrence May trialled its use to irrigate his crops. May also established the first windmill in Pitt Town for the production of flour.

Pitt Town has also had an important relationship to the Hawkesbury River, being the site of John Grono's large boatbuilding enterprise in the early 19th century and had a ferry service running from the northern end of the township to Wilberforce which was taken over by the Presbyterian Church and remained in service until the 1920s. The original punt bell survives in the Hawkesbury Regional Museum at Windsor.

For much of the 19th century, Pitt Town was an isolated rural community, surrounded by an agricultural landscape, producing large quantities of maize, grain and corn. By the 20th century, much of the agricultural produce was in citrus (oranges). However, with the rise in importation of citrus from the global market, demand for the local market gradually dwindled and many citrus growers bulldozed their groves. Since 2010, the landscape has been transitioning to urban residential.

In 1987, the Pitt Town Shopping Centre was constructed with the Bird in Hand Inn being converted to a Public inn. For most of the 20th Century, it served as a general store, known as Millers Store. It was originally built opposite the current site in 1825 but was demolished and the present building built in the mid-1840s. The shopping village in Eldon Street was extended along Bathurst Street in 2006.

Pitt Town has also been the site of numerous interesting as well as controversial development and infrastructure proposals. During the 1940s, to bolster Australia's defence in the War in the Pacific, it was necessary to accommodate for the additional aircraft. An ancillary runway to the Richmond RAAF base was built in what is today known as 'Airstrip Road'. It was here that decoy aircraft complete with decoy buildings and vegetable gardens were installed, while the real aircraft was concealed beneath camouflage nets. Following the end of World War II in 1945, the Pitt Town Airstrip was converted for use as a race track by James Hardie, where the Ferrodo disc brakes were trialled. This lasted until the mid-1960s.

During the late 1980s, Pitt Town had been identified as the potential site of Sydney's second international airport, with the proposed runways (shown on official reports at the time), running directly through the present village area. Had the proposal succeeded, Pitt Town would have been eradicated from existence. By the end of the 1980s, a proposal had been made to convert the nearby former Army training camp at Scheyville to a high-security prison. The various controversial proposals ultimately led to the formation of the Pitt Town Preservation Society, who advocated for the protection and promotion of the historical significance of Pitt Town, producing a periodical to their subscribers called 'The Crier'.

1915 marked the 100th anniversary of the re-establishment of Pitt Town and 2015 marked the bicentenary. As part of the 2010 bicentenary of the Macquarie Towns, a parade was held along Bathurst Street.

=== Architecture and infrastructure ===
Pitt Town has two churches: St James' Anglican Church ('Pitt town Anglican Church') and associated cemetery, and The Scots Church which face each other on Bathurst Street. There are also two cemeteries in Pitt Town. The Pitt Town General Cemetery is located on Old Stock Route Road. The Pitt Town (St James') Anglican Cemetery is on Old Pitt Town Road, and it contains many of the early pioneers of Pitt Town.

During World War II a second airstrip was built in Pitt Town to cope with the additional volume of aircraft movements at the Royal Australian Air Force base. Following the end of the war, the airstrip was abandoned and became an automotive race and testing track for Hardie-Ferodo. It is now a public road known as Airstrip Road.

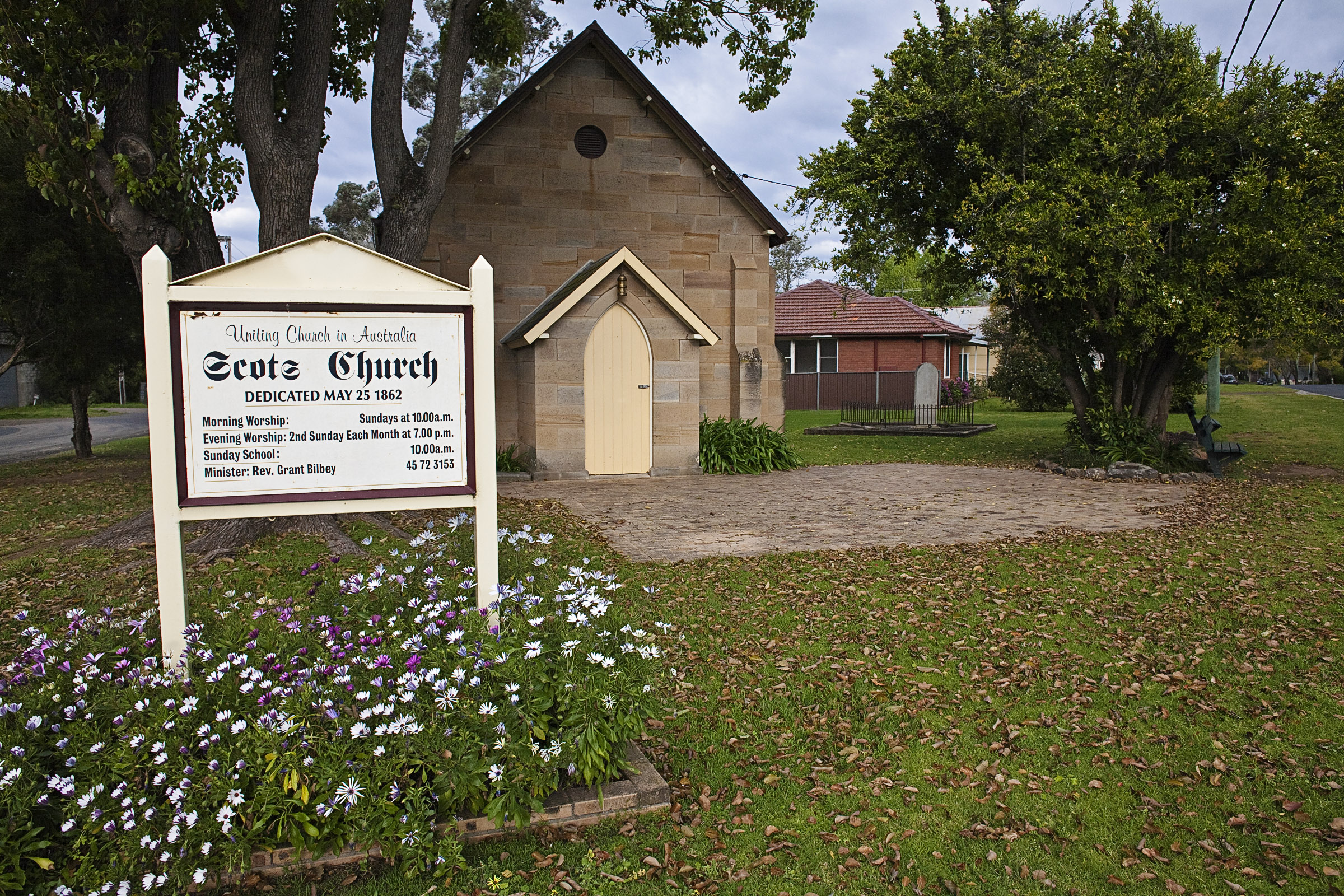
Scots Church Pitt Town

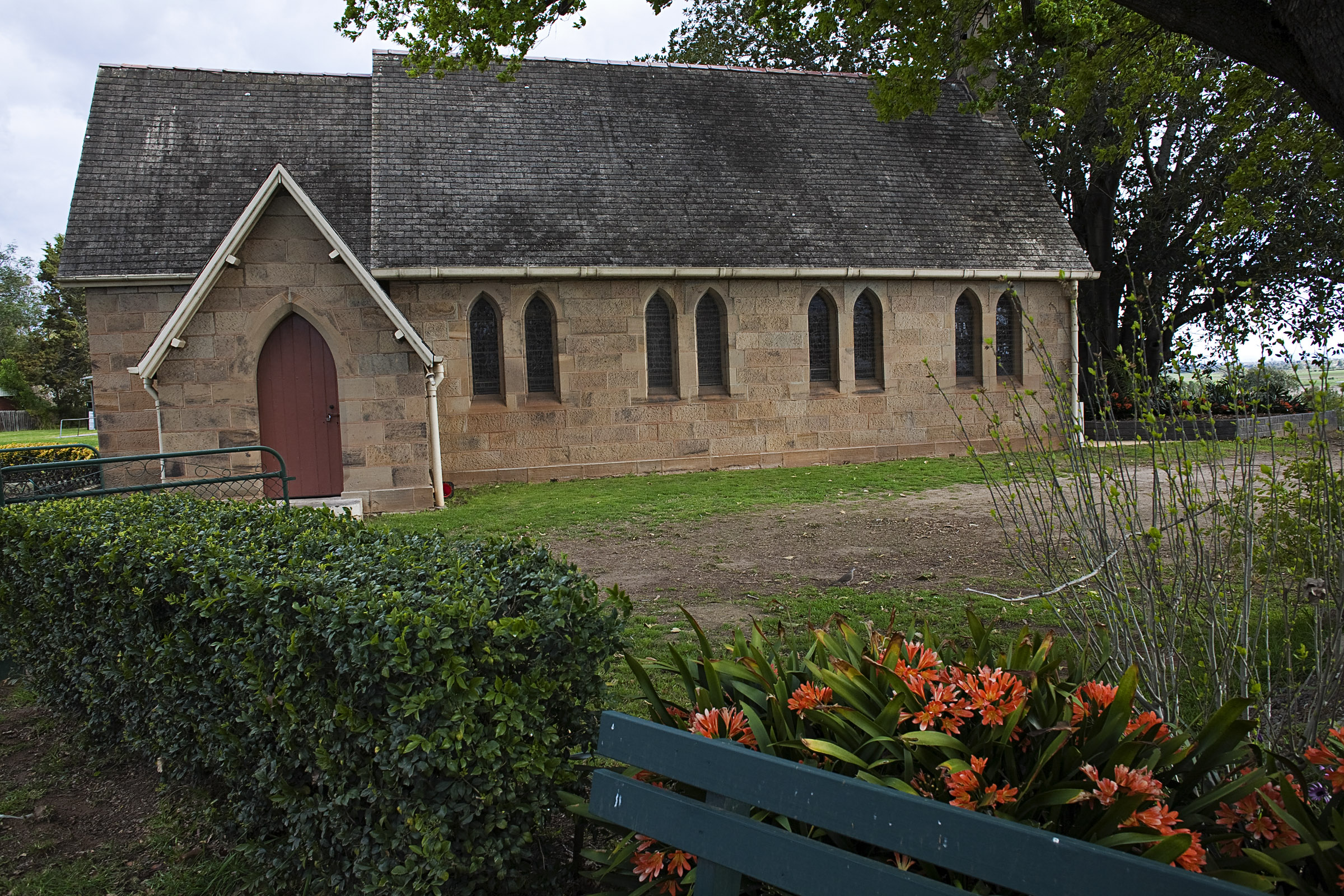
St James' Anglican Church

=== Heritage listings ===
Pitt Town has a large concentration of heritage-listed sites, indicative of the early and significant history of the area, including the following listed on the New South Wales State Heritage Register:

- 104–106 Bathurst Street: Macquarie Arms Inn
- 87 Eldon Street: Bird In The Hand Inn

Sites listed on other heritage registers include:

- St James' Anglican Church on Bathurst Street was designed by Edmund Blacket. It was built by Thomas Collison for £1050 in 1857–58. Blacket also designed the 24 pews, pulpit, reading desk and communion rail. The church is in the Victorian Gothic Revival style, which was normal practice for religious buildings, and is listed on the Register of the National Estate.
- Scots Presbyterian Church, a much simpler building than St James', was built and dedicated in 1862. Located opposite the Anglican church in Bathurst Street. It is in the Gothic Revival style and is listed on the Register of the National Estate.
- At 120 and 126 Bathurst Street there are late nineteenth century weatherboard houses; at 132 Bathurst Street there are very old slab cottages and outbuildings.
- Bona Vista in Johnston Street was built in 1888. It has a long entrance drive with Norfolk Island pines and camphor. Its original rural landscaped setting has now been lost through the recent residential subdivision of the area.
- At the northern end of Bathurst Street, overlooking Pitt Town Bottoms, is The Manse, which belonged to the oldest Presbyterian Church in Australia, situated across and down the river at Ebenezer. This illustrates that the early communities were not divided by the Hawkesbury River but united by it. The Manse is listed on the Register of the National Estate.

== Demographics ==
=== Summary ===
Selected data from 2021 census for Pitt Town
Population	Estimated residents on census night	3,871
Population	Estimated ATSI population on census night	124
Cultural and language diversity		
Ancestry, top responses	Australian	43.4%
Ancestry, top responses	English	41.4%
Ancestry, top responses	Irish	10.5%
Ancestry, top responses	Scottish	9.6%
Ancestry, top responses	Maltese	5.9%
Language, top responses (other than English)	Maltese	0.8%
Language, top responses (other than English)	Italian	0.5%
Language, top responses (other than English)	Arabic	0.5%
Language, top responses (other than English)	Russian	0.3%
Language, top responses (other than English)	Punjabi	0.3%
Religious affiliation		
Religious affiliation, top responses	Catholic	31.3%
Religious affiliation, top responses	Anglican	26.9%
Religious affiliation, top responses	No religion, so described	26.8%
Religious affiliation, top responses	Uniting Church	3.3%
Religious affiliation, top responses	Not stated	2.9%
Median weekly incomes		
Personal income	Median weekly personal income	A$1,014
Personal income	% of Australian median income	126.0%
Family income	Median weekly family income	A$2,832
Family income	% of Australian median income	133.6%
Household income	Median weekly household income	A$2,707
Household income	% of Australian median income	155.0%
Dwelling structure		
Dwelling type	Separate house	95.9%
Dwelling type	Semi-detached, terrace or townhouse	0.5%
Dwelling type	Flat or Apartment	2.6%

=== Culture ===
The majority of Pitt Town has an Australian or English background, with an Anglican or Catholic religious affiliation. The most spoken language is English, followed by Maltese (0.8%). The majority (92.2%) of Pitt Town only speaks English at home.

=== Politics ===
Electorates of Pitt Town
Local government area	City of Hawkesbury
State electoral district	District of Hawkesbury
Federal electoral division	Division of Macquarie

Pitt Town has shown a continued support for the Australian Liberal Party across all electorates. In the 2016 federal election, the Pitt Town polling place showed a two-party preferred of 76.4% for the Liberal Party despite the broader electorate showing a 52.2% two-party preference for the Australian Labor Party. In the 2019 New South Wales state election, the Pitt Town polling place showed a two-party preferred of 81.7% for the Liberal Party, with the broader Hawkesbury electorate showing a two-party preferred of 67.5% for the Liberal Party.

There have been few local political issues in Pitt Town. Most have concerned local gentrification. Long-term residents have shown resistance to population growth and demanded newer infrastructures to mitigate growing traffic in the area. The New South Wales government has responded to these concerns by considering the development of a "Pitt Town bypass" to divert traffic away from the town centre.

=== Population ===
Historical population
Year	Pop.	±%
2001	734	—
2006	1,311	+78.6%
2011	1,963	+49.7%
2016	3,033	+54.5%
2021	3,871	+27.6%

Pitt Town is a growing suburb in the north-west of Greater Western Sydney. In 2006, it had a population of 1,311. 10 years later in 2016, Pitt Town had a population of 3,033. Over the 10-year period, the population of Pitt Town increased by 231.4%. Pitt Town's population is continuing to grow due to the expanding Vermont development which began in 2007, and the Eden Fields development by Allam Property Group. Pitt Town is also less than 7 kilometres north of Sydney's North West Growth Area which has accounted for the influx of population.

In 2018, the Roads & Maritime Services has recently approved a long-awaited bypass of the township to divert through-traffic away from the town centre when travelling to Cattai and Wisemans Ferry from Windsor. Further, the low rental price despite a high property value may be explained by the distance from public transport, commerce, jobs, and other amenities which attract tenants. Pitt Town is 8.8 km from Mulgrave railway station, and has only two bus services at low frequency.

=== Wealth ===
The residents of Pitt Town have grown in wealth over the past decade. In 2006, the median weekly household income was $1,265. In 2016, it was $2,316 per week. Over 10 years, the median weekly household income increased by 183.1%, despite the consumer price index increasing by only 126.9% during the same 10-year period. In light of the Sydney housing bubble, the trend of the median property price has been exponential. In 2009, the median property price was approximately $442,500, which increased to A$1,350,000 by 2017. Pitt Town has been recognised as one of Sydney's latest "million-dollar suburbs". Average rent has correspondingly increased from a median of $219 in 2011, to $400 in 2016.

Pitt Town's wealth is higher than the state and national average, but lower than the surrounding suburbs. In 2017, Pitt Town had an average house sale price of $1.3 million. To the north of Pitt Town is Cattai which had an average house sale price of A$1.6 million in 2017. To the south of Pitt Town is Oakville which had an average house sale price of A$2.1 million in 2017. Finally, to the east of Pitt Town is Maraylya which had an average house sale price of A$1.9 million in 2017. The difference in property price may be a result of Pitt Town's averagely smaller land size compared to the surrounding rural estates.

== Education ==
Pitt Town Public School is on Buckingham Street and is an Australian primary school. It is the fourth schoolhouse in Pitt Town. The first and original schoolhouse was established around 1814 and was situated along present-day Old Pitt Town Road, near the current Church of England burial ground. Originally of Anglican denomination, the first schoolhouse was abandoned in 1820, when the Colonial Government purchased a large weatherboard house, converting it into a temporary chapel and schoolhouse, becoming the second schoolhouse. In 1827, the third schoolhouse was built, which was of brick construction and situated on land reserved for education and a church. It would become the future site of Pitt Town Anglican Church (1857–1858).

In 1876, a new schoolhouse was being built around the corner in Buckingham Street as the first Government school in Pitt Town. It opened in 1878.

Pitt Town is also serviced by Arndell Anglican College in Oakville (5.1 km away), and Windsor High School in Windsor (5.4 km away).

== Pop culture ==
In 1981, Pitt Town became known nationally and internationally as the setting for Wandin Valley in the long-running television series A Country Practice (1981–1993). The series was broadcast twice weekly on the Seven Network .

The television drama series A Country Practice used this village for many external scenes. The heritage house opposite Pitt Town Public School was used as the home of characters Frank and Shirley Gilroy (Brian Wenzel and Lorrae Desmond). The hardware store on the corner of Bathurst, Eldon and Grenville Streets was known as "Muldoon's Store", the Bird in Hand Inn was known as the "Wandin Valley General Store". Other buildings used include a number of private residential dwellings along Bathurst Street for 'Matron Maggie Sloan' (Joan Sydney) and Eldon Street and Hawkesbury Street for 'Esme Watson' (Joyce Jacobs). The television series also used a number of other well known buildings in the Hawkesbury area, including the hospital (located at 29 Clare Crescent in Oakville), the doctor's surgery (the former Court House Hotel, Windsor located at 37–39 North St, Windsor), Burrigan High School (Windsor High School), and Burrigan Swimming Pool (the former Hornsby Aquatic Centre – demolished in 2012). When A Country Practice was relaunched on rival Network Ten in 1994, filming moved to Emerald, Victoria.
