= Sun-Herald =

Sun-Herald may refer to:

- The Sun-Herald, the Sunday edition of The Sydney Morning Herald, a newspaper based in Sydney, Australia
- Sun Herald, a newspaper based in Biloxi, Mississippi

== See also ==
- Herald Sun, in Melbourne, Australia
- The Herald-Sun, in Durham, North Carolina
