= McGraths Hill =

- Suburb
- Interactive map of McGraths Hill
- Coordinates: 33°37′10″S 150°50′35″E
- Country: Australia
- State: New South Wales
- City: Sydney
- LGA: City of Hawkesbury
- Location: 53 km (33 mi) north-west of Sydney CBD

Government
  - State electorate: Hawkesbury
  - Federal division: Macquarie
- Elevation: 17 m (56 ft)

Population
  - Total: 2,537 (2021 census)
- Postcode: 2756
Suburbs around McGraths Hill
Windsor	Pitt Town Bottoms	Pitt Town
Windsor	McGraths Hill	Oakville
Mulgrave	Vineyard	Oakville

McGraths Hill is a suburb of Sydney, in the state of New South Wales, Australia. It is located 53 kilometres north-west of the Sydney central business district in the local government area of the City of Hawkesbury. It is bounded in the north-west by South Creek, shortly before it enters the Hawkesbury River. It is named after James McGrath, an Irish convict transported to Australia aboard the Hercules in 1802, who purchased property in the area around 1813.
