= Rose Cottage, Ruthin =

Building in Denbighshire, Wales

Rose Cottage
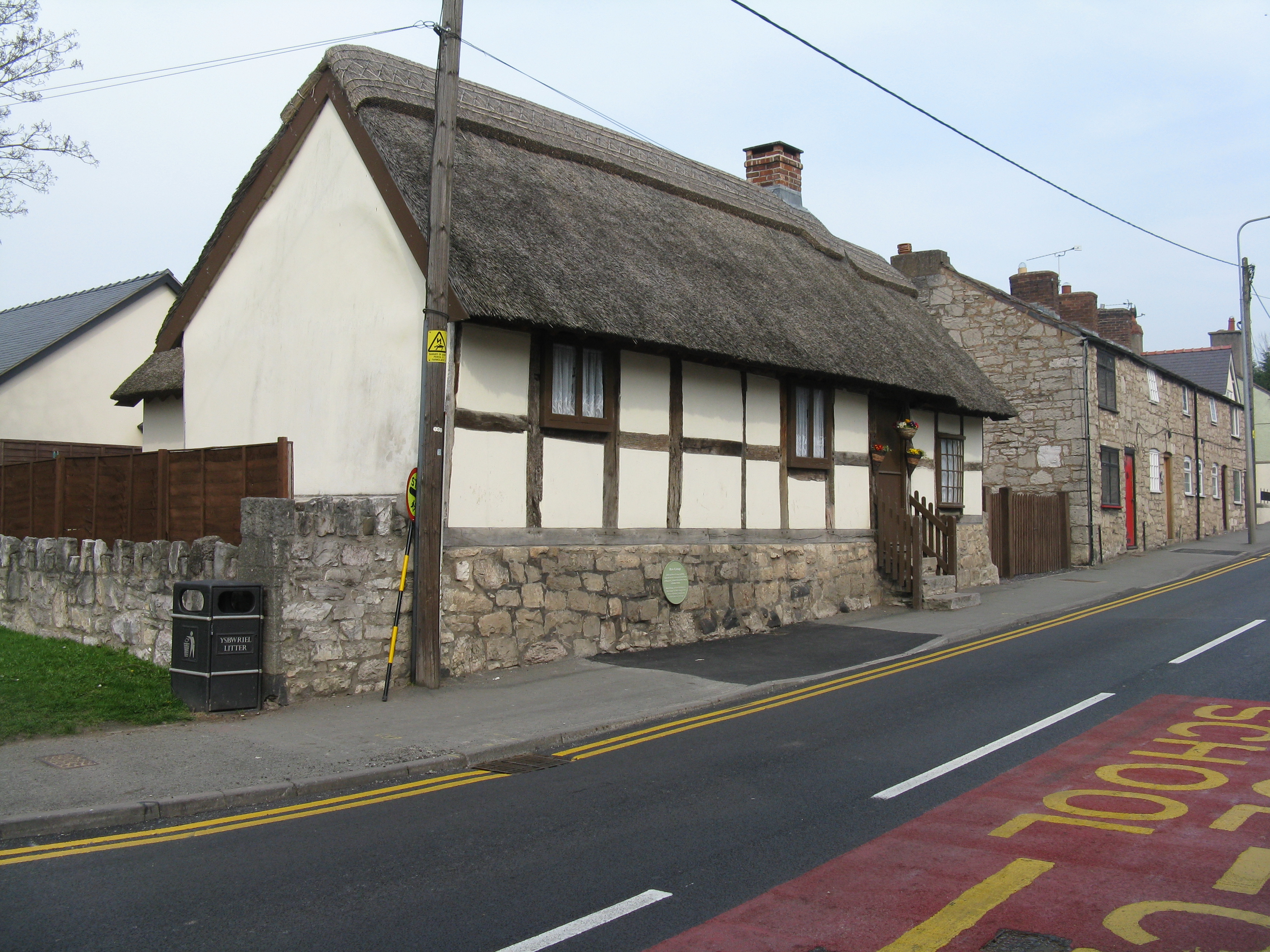
- Rose Cottage in 2012

- Location within Denbighshire

General information
- Status: Completed
- Location: Ruthin, Denbighshire, Wales
- Coordinates: 53.114283°N 3.303703°W
- Construction started: Medieval

Other information
- Parking: No

Listed Building – Grade II*
- Official name: Rose Cottage
- Designated: 16 May 1978
- Reference no.: 903

Rose Cottage is a medieval cruck-framed hall-house in the community of Ruthin, Denbighshire, Wales. It was Grade II* listed (reference number 903) in 1978.

It is a privatively owned residence which is listed as "an exceptional survival of a medieval cruck-framed hall-house of relatively low status, retaining its plan-form, character and detail". The chimney is 17th century, and is a fine example of the transition between an open-hearth and a full fireplace.

== Location ==
This building is beside the A494 road entering Ruthin from Mold.
