= Pitt Town Bottoms =

- Suburb
- Interactive map of Pitt Town Bottoms
- Coordinates: 33°35′59″S 150°51′5″E
- Country: Australia
- State: New South Wales
- LGA: City of Hawkesbury
- Location: 58 km (36 mi) from Sydney CBD
- Established: 1794

Government
  - State electorate: Hawkesbury
  - Federal division: Macquarie
- Elevation: 3 m (9.8 ft)

Population
  - Total: 85 (SAL 2021)
- Postcode: 2756
Suburbs around Pitt Town Bottoms
Freemans Reach	Wilberforce	Pitt Town
Cornwallis	Pitt Town Bottoms	Oakville
Windsor	McGraths Hill	Oakville

Pitt Town Bottoms is a historic town and suburb of Sydney, in the state of New South Wales, Australia. Pitt Town Bottoms is located 58 kilometres north-west of the Sydney central business district in the local government area of the City of Hawkesbury. It is bounded in the west by the Hawkesbury River.

== History ==
Pitt Town Bottoms was the location of the first settlements in the district. It was here, in 1794, that Lieutenant-Governor Francis Grose granted fifteen 30-acre (12 hectare) farms to free settlers. From here, fresh produce for the infant Sydney town was shipped down the Hawkesbury River.

Lots 43 and 44 constitute the area that was bought by emancipee James Ruse in 1794.

In recent times Pitt Town Bottoms has become home to a popular radio-controlled aircraft flying field. It is also a major base of the Sydney lawn turf industry.

== See also ==
- Pitt Town, New South Wales
