= Government Cottage Archaeological Site =

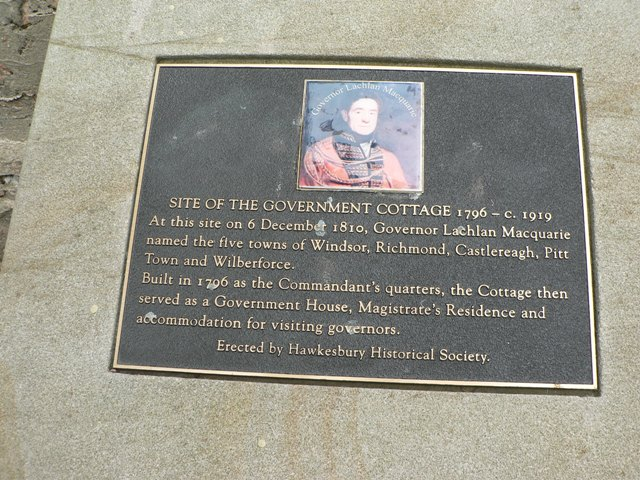
- Plaque marking the site

- Location within New South Wales Location within Australia
- 33.6035°S 150.8246°E
- Location: 41 George Street, Windsor, City of Hawkesbury, New South Wales, Australia

History
- Built: 1796–1815

New South Wales Heritage Register
- Official name: Government Cottage Archaeological Site; Commandant's House; Government House
- Type: state heritage (archaeological-terrestrial)
- Designated: 4 February 2011
- Reference no.: 1843
- Type: Government House
- Category: Government and Administration

Government Cottage Archaeological Site is the heritage-listed site of a cottage which served alternately as the base for the Colony of New South Wales' commandant of the Hawkesbury district, house of the district's magistrate and an "informal official residence" for the Governor of New South Wales when in the district. It is located at 41 George Street, Windsor, New South Wales, Australia. The original house was built from 1796 to 1815 and demolished c. 1920-21. It was also known as Commandant's House and Government House. It was added to the New South Wales State Heritage Register on 4 February 2011.

== History ==
Before any European settlement the Hawkesbury region was inhabited by the Dharug people. The riparian area along the Hawkesbury River had been a food source for the local Aboriginal people for over 50,000 years and, with relatively frequent floods that spread enriched alluvium throughout the surrounding land, the region was known to be an abundant and reliable resource for food.

Following European settlement, the new colonists quickly recognised the agricultural potential of the banks of the Hawkesbury River. This led to intensive farming of the area to supply food to the developing colony that was experiencing severe shortages in the early years. However, following flooding in 1799, 1800, 1806 and 1809, life for the colonists farming the flats of the Hawkesbury River was a hard one, fraught with potential devastation with any inundation of the river.

Following the opening of the Hawkesbury district for settlement, the road from Parramatta to Windsor was constructed in 1794. The farming area along the Hawkesbury River, including Green Hills (known as Windsor, from 1810) became the third urban satellite of the colony after Sydney and Parramatta. Windsor grew up as a military and service centre for the Hawkesbury flood-plain and was the location of the colony's richest agricultural land. The Commandant's Cottage, later the Government Cottage was one of a series of buildings constructed under the administration of Governor John Hunter between 1795 and 1800 for military and government purposes, including storehouses, and granaries and soldiers barracks. The location selected was sufficiently high to preclude danger of the building being affected by flood. It replaced a soldier's barracks constructed c. 1795 which Governor Hunter described in 1796 as a "miserable building". Its location would also enable a clear view of the area over which the Commandant had oversight.

The Commandant's Cottage (later known as the Government Cottage) was under construction in 1796. David Collins described how in April of that year "a very excellent barrack was erecting for the use of the commandant, on a spot which had been selected sufficiently high to preclude any danger of the building being affected by a flood". Collins' use of "barrack" to describe the Commandant's House has encouraged confusion with the separate barracks for the soldiers, already in existence by 1796, described as a "miserable building" which was replaced after October 1796 with more substantial accommodation for the troops. The Commandant's House was completed after October 1796 and was described in 1800 in Governor Hunter's list of buildings constructed since 1796 as "a framed and weatherboard house on the Green Hills...for the residence of the commanding officer of that district". The roof was shingled and the building furnished with a cellar, skilling kitchen and other accommodation with a paling fence.

The new Commandant's House sat high on a grassy hill facing the principal street to the east. The south side of the house had an extensive view over the river and the valley and beyond to the Blue Mountains. To the west Richmond was visible until c. 1914. The new building was on a plot of crown land which was by 1795 surrounded by settlers' grants. From June 1795 military commandants were in charge of the Hawkesbury settlement. Commandant Edward Abbott moved in to the cottage when it was completed late in 1796 and subsequent Commandants, Neil McKellar, Anthony Fenn Kemp and Thomas Hobby also lived there. Two significant lawsuits were associated with the Commandant's House. One case brought by the ex-convict John Harris against Fenn Kemp, when the Revd Samuel Marsden brought the two parties together at the House in an unsuccessful attempt at conciliation in 1798: this was the first lawsuit brought by an ex-convict against the military and was a critical stage in the victory of civil law. The other case, in 1799, concerned the murder of two Aboriginal youths, where the accused, Constable Edward Powell, claimed as part of his alibi that he was too tired to be involved, having that day come from Sydney and then spent some time at the Commandant's House.

The land on which the new building now stood marked the end of a row of a series of promises of grants made by 1794. The land was enclosed in 1795 when a promise of grant was made to James Whitehouse. In 1800 Governor King appointed Charles Grimes, deputy surveyor, to be the first resident Hawkesbury magistrate. Grimes also had responsibility for other civic duties previously conducted by the military administrators, including that of superintendent of public works at Hawkesbury and it is believed that he lived at least some of the time in the government cottage. It was around this time that residents were required to assemble to attend musters (a type of census) on the front grounds of the cottage

Governor Bligh noted that in 1806 the roof and foundations of the house had decayed and had become untenantable. A year later he had repaired the building and added two new rooms. It has been presumed that the cottage was used for either governor's visits or the government administrators from 1807 until 1810.

The Commandant's House was used by Governor Hunter on his many visits to the Hawkesbury. This continued under Governor King, whose familiarity with the area was evident in his far-reaching and long-lasting definition of the river settlements, now hemmed in by the new common lands proclaimed by King in 1804. King's proclamation of three districts at Hawkesbury moreover paved the way for Macquarie's later siting of the towns. Already in 1800 King had ended the period of military residence in the cottage. Instead the House was occupied by the first resident Hawkesbury magistrate. Charles Grimes was appointed in July 1800 with responsibility for civic duties previously conducted by the military, including the superintendence of public works. It was around this time that residents were required to assemble for musters, a type of census, in the grounds of the cottage.

Lachlan Macquarie and his family arrived in Sydney in January 1810 to accept his commission as Governor of New South Wales. Macquarie's first year as governor was considered a success and set the tone and character for the twelve years of Macquarie's administration. He re-organised government departments and created a strong focus on the construction of quality public works using convict labour that transformed Sydney, Parramatta and the new townships and are still numerous in the twenty-first century.

During Macquarie's first tour of the outlying districts in November and December 1810 Macquarie arrived at Green Hills and viewed the cottage for the first time. He recorded the following in relation to the cottage and surrounds in his journals.

"At half past 5 O'Clock we arrived at the ferry on the left bank of the river and at 6 O'Clock landed in the Government Garden on the Green Hills and took possession of the Government House or, more properly speaking, Government Cottage; most beautifully situated on the summit of a very fine bank or terrace rising about fifty feet above the level of the river; of which, and the adjacent Country, there is a very fine view from this sweet delightful spot.....Mrs. M. and myself were quite delighted with the beauty of this part of the Country; its great fertility, and its Picturesque appearance; and especially with the well-chosen and remarkable fine scite [sic] and situation of the Government Cottage and Garden on the Green Hills. We dined soon after our arrival and after dinner our friend and family physician Doctor Redfern took his departure for Sydney.

Macquarie used the cottage to celebrate with 21 guests the naming of the towns of Windsor, Richmond, Castlereagh, Pitt Town and Wilberforce on Thursday 6 December after he had confirmed their exact sites. This christening was marked by a drinking of a bumper to the success of each town after dinner. He also used it as the base for his expeditions to mark out the five towns. The town sites were marked out a little over a month after the naming of the towns. Castlereagh and Richmond were marked out on Thursday 10 January 1811 and Macquarie held a dinner at the Windsor house to celebrate. Wilberforce and Pitt-town were marked out the next day (Friday) and Windsor on Saturday 12 January. He would continue to use the cottage as his residence and place of business during visits to the Hawkesbury throughout his governorship and he frequently issued government orders from the cottage. Macquarie also employed a live-in housekeeper, Ann Blady, a successful ex-convict with her own 50-acre grant, who had retired from practising midwifery in the area in 1810. Ann and her constable husband, William Blady, exemplify the connection that the citizens of Hawkesbury from many walks of life had with the Government Cottage. For Macquarie, as for Grose, Hunter, King and Bligh before him, the cottage was an informal official residence in addition to Government House in Sydney (First Government House) and Old Government House in Parramatta.

The cottage was again repaired and improved under Macquarie. The painting by George William Evans of around 1809 shows only a western verandah, on the river-side, whereas Philip Slaeger's drawing and etching of 1812 or 1813 shows a substantial new southern verandah and the end of a new eastern verandah. Neatly furnished with chairs and tables from the workshops of the lumber yard, the expanded cottage became a significant part of the Government Domain at Windsor. The stables were located on the southern boundary of the property, near to what became Thompson Square under Macquarie, opposite the Government Stores. The gates to the garden and domain were located opposite the two-storey Macquarie Arms Hotel.

Governor Macquarie stated in his 1810–1822 report of building works during his administration of the colony that the cottage at Windsor had been repaired and much improved during his governorship. In addition a domain and garden consisting of six acres partly enclosed by a strong fence had been created, and a small coach house and stable erected for the use of the Governor and his staff. A report into improvements to, and the state of public buildings by Standish Harris during the year 1823 ordered by Governor Brisbane described the Government Cottage as being "on a small scale, situated on a rising ground, commanding a beautiful view from the rear of the Hawkesbury River. It is a desirable scite (sic) for a good public building were it not so near the town - yet from its contiguity to the banks of this fine river with the diversity of richness of its soil, it might be made an enviable residence either as a villa or a mansion." He noted a well, 3/4 constructed in stone sunk, rubbish removed, repair of brickwork and the addition of a room, the ceiling reformed in the dressing room, additional panes of glass the use of distemper paint in at least one room and the hall (the room was blue), the addition of 3 new doors, white washing of ceilings etc, oil painting of sashes and skirting boards, addition or new room of skirting boards, painting of architraves, mouldings, brick sewer added and works to the kitchen, including small oven. There is also mention of a small, badly contrived privy including sewer to river. The report also noted repairs to a garden house which appear to include a room and stables.

Following Macquarie's departure the cottage was occupied by police magistrate Samuel North. It was granted to John McCall Junior by Crown Grant on 21 July 1854. It passed through several owners, including James Bourke until it was acquired by Michael Raper in April 1867. Raper retained the property until his death in 1911. The property was willed to his daughter Jane Wilkinson.

In 1916 the Australian Historical Society urged the Windsor Council to take steps to preserve the building that was fast falling into decay. They noted that the weatherboards, doors, windows and fittings were of cedar and that two different types of bricks had been used the building. The bricks and mortar and the plastering were considered well preserved given the local climate. By this time the large tree that once stood next to the building had been removed due to a large tree limb falling onto the house during a windstorm. A plan from about this time notes a variety of materials used in the cottage, including lath and plaster walls, and brick nogging, plastered and weatherboard external walls. The cellar is not noted.

Jane Wilkinson and her husband sold the property to the James Drury Burch in 1919. It has remained with members of the Burch family until the 2000s when it was inherited by Mrs Burch's sisters. The purchase of the property by James Burch appears to have been the impetus for the demolition of what remained of the old cottage to be replaced by the existing cottage in the 1920s. The new cottage was named Green Hills and retains this name. Small changes have taken place since this time including the addition and removal of a variety of gardens and the addition of fencing. At some point a garage was added to the property.

In the 1970s several alterations took place. Additionally, a weatherboard coach house with skillion roof located on a boundary was removed. Little change has taken place in recent years. In 2010 the only visible physical reminder of the government cottage is the remainder of the panoramic view across the river recognised for its beauty by Macquarie and Harris and many of those who had the opportunity to gaze upon it.

=== Art and the Government Cottage ===
The government cottage has featured in the work of numerous artworks documenting the early development of Windsor. In particular it has been the apparent location for works depicting the opposite side of the riverbank. George Evans c. 1807 and c. 1809 (The Settlement of Green Hills) and c. 1810–11. The Hawkesbury is well documented by Evans, also a notable artist, due primarily to him maintaining a property in the Hawkesbury district. An 1815 image looking across the river towards Cornwallis by Captain James Wallis was sketched with the help of a camera lucida from the grounds of the cottage. Philip Slaeger produced ' A View of a part of the Town of Windsor from across South Creek, in 1812 or 1813, with a fine detailed view of the cottage from the south-west. The famous flood panorama of 1816 by an unidentified artist was painted from the vicinity of the cottage. Joseph Lycett's 1824 "View of Windsor Upon the Hawkesbury from across South Creek", for the first time documented the various government buildings in the vicinity of the government cottage, although their distance in the image make individual buildings difficult to identify except on very close inspection.

=== Government Houses in south-east Australia ===
The term government house is generally associated in Australia with houses which were used officially as a governors or government representatives residences and places of work. These included larger sites such as Government House, Sydney and old Government House Parramatta, and smaller houses such as that located at East Maitland. In addition, the term also refers to the homes of the commanding officer of military detachments located at penal establishments or distant settlements of the commandant of penal establishments or distant establishments. There are seven penal establishments known to have had Government Houses – Newcastle, Sarah Island at Macquarie Harbour, Port Macquarie (Port Macquarie Government House Site), Moreton Bay (Queensland), Maria Island (Tasmania), Norfolk Island and Port Arthur, Tasmania. Most of the government Houses were established in the 1820s, the exception being Newcastle whose Government House was likely to be earlier, reflecting the site's earlier establishment. A government House was constructed at the settlement of Bathurst west of the Blue Mountains c. 1818.

== Description ==
The residential site is located on a ridge overlooking the Hawkesbury River and is located in an important position in relation to Thompson Square and the North Street precincts. It is part of the George Street North precinct, contributing to the character of the street. Set back from the curve of George Street, aspects of the once commanding view over the area are now limited by more recent building and the growth of trees, but are still evident. The most significant view is across the river towards Freemans Reach, including the bridge over the Hawkesbury River at Windsor, the oldest extant crossing of the Hawkesbury River and one of only two bridge crossings of the Hawkesbury River in the Hawkesbury area. Other views include down Arndell Street in an easterly direction overlooking part of the 1794 farm grants, the very beginning of the district, still legible in the landscape.

The site is divided into two portions. The upper portion of the site is level and grassy with gardens and remnant gardens and a c. 1920 residence. Some areas of grass show signs of previous disturbance, although it is unclear whether these relate to the earlier building on the site or more recent garden works. A modern, tubular palisade fence creates a division between the level and sloped areas of the site. A single garage is located on the north east corner of the flat section of the site and accessed via an informal driveway. The front of the property is not fenced although a small retaining wall provides some assistance in maintaining the level character of the front portion of the site. The curve of George Street at this point still reflects the original bend in the road past the Government cottage before 1810.

The single storey bungalow style house is located at the front of the site. It has rendered masonry walls and a corrugated iron roof. Decorative glass windows are evident. An open verandah is located on the southeast and south west sides of the house. An additional verandah on the north east side of the house has been infilled to create additional internal space.

The rear of the site slopes steeply towards the river and contains a significant number of trees that have begun to encroach on the view. This bank alignment is recognisably the same as that shown in all the early nineteenth-century images before, during and immediately after Macquarie's governorship.

A stone plinth with plaque is located at the front boundary of the property describing the sites history as the location of the former government cottage

As at 14 January 2010, there has been no archaeological testing of the site and there has been no significant excavation for works such as pools or basement car parks. The existing building is smaller than the former cottage and its 1920s type and date of construction suggest that archaeological evidence of the previous building is likely to remain. The outbuilding was located on or near the existing driveway, a development which is unlikely to have disturbed any underground deposits. The original basement/cellar is thought likely to have been filled in, possibly with materials from the old cottage and, therefore, potentially in situ. Archaeological deposits have been preserved under more modern buildings in the area generally and therefore it is considered highly possible that archaeological evidence survives despite no formal archaeological assessment.

=== Modifications and dates ===
- 1806–07 – roof and floor repaired and two rooms added by Bligh
- c. 1811–1815 – repairs and improvements made to the cottage
- c. 1920–21 – building demolished
- early 1920s – existing building constructed on site

== Heritage listing ==
The site and its views have outstanding state significance as evidence of the earliest development of the Hawkesbury district, its initial role as the Commandant's cottage quickly establishing its symbolism as an important representation of the presence of government and military control in the district. The high potential of existing archaeological features and deposits in a site where key elements in shaping the development of the district have converged - the arrival of the man who shaped the development of the district (Macquarie), the presence of the cottage on a site which captured Macquarie's aesthetic interest and the role of the cottage in trips to name and mark out the five Macquarie Towns - creating a landmark site in the historical development of the site representative of the birth of the Hawkesbury district as it is understood today. It is likely to be the site of one of the earliest Government Cottages constructed outside the Sydney colony.

Government Cottage Archaeological Site was listed on the New South Wales State Heritage Register on 4 February 2011 having satisfied the following criteria.

The place is important in demonstrating the course, or pattern, of cultural or natural history in New South Wales.

The site has state significance as the base for Governor Macquarie's travels and activities in and around the Hawkesbury District, in particular while he marked out the sites of the five Macquarie towns, Windsor, Richmond, Wilberforce, Castlereagh and Pitt Town. It has state significance as the location of one of the earliest government buildings established at Windsor as well as one of a series of buildings constructed to house members of the military establishment in the locality. The location has particular significance as a physical representation of the civil control established at the Hawkesbury settlement between 1795–1796 and c. 1810 and thus, the centre of government for the settlement.

The place has a strong or special association with a person, or group of persons, of importance of cultural or natural history of New South Wales's history.

The site has particular associations as the location of an early building in the colony outside Sydney constructed as part of the military establishment at Green Hills (later Windsor) under the administration of Governor Hunter c. 1796. It is closely associated with all the later eighteenth-century military administrators of the Hawkesbury, Commandants Abbott, McKellar, Fenn Kemp and Hobby, and with the governors Hunter, King, Bligh and, especially, Macquarie.

The place is important in demonstrating aesthetic characteristics and/or a high degree of creative or technical achievement in New South Wales.

The site has state significance for its views from the ridge above the Hawkesbury River to the river and the floodplains beyond in the direction of Cornwallis and Freeman's Reach, notable as early as 1810. The views provide a context for understanding of the site of the cottage as the commandant's house, located in a commanding position for surveillance of the infant third settlement, and the responses it provoked in visitors regarding its beauty.

The place has potential to yield information that will contribute to an understanding of the cultural or natural history of New South Wales.

The surviving archaeological deposits and features have state significance as evidence of one of the earliest eighteenth-century buildings in the colony outside of Sydney, and one of the first permanent public buildings constructed at the third Sydney settlement, Windsor. The remains have the potential to demonstrate the manner in which the building was added to and adapted to suit its changing roles

The place possesses uncommon, rare or endangered aspects of the cultural or natural history of New South Wales.

The archaeological site is likely to include elements of one of the earliest government cottages constructed outside of Sydney in the colony and one of a few whose main purpose for construction was not to house a Commandant in charge of overseeing convicts specifically.
