= Mackenzie House, Windsor =

Mackenzie House
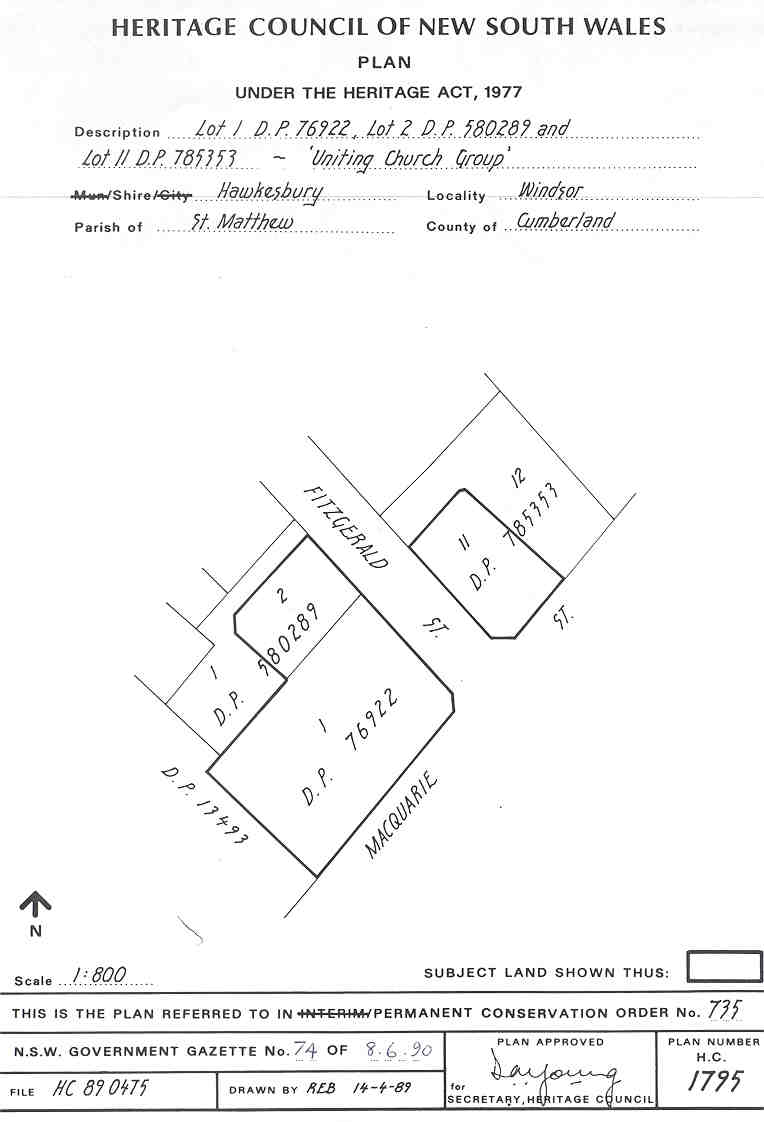
- Heritage boundaries

- Location within Sydney Location within Australia
- 33°36′27″S 150°49′15″E
- Location: 29 Fitzgerald Street, Windsor, City of Hawkesbury, New South Wales, Australia

New South Wales Heritage Register
- Official name: Mackenzie House; Uniting Church Group
- Type: State heritage (built)
- Designated: 2 April 1999
- Reference no.: 735
- Type: House
- Category: Residential buildings (private)

Mackenzie House is a heritage-listed house located at 29 Fitzgerald Street, Windsor, City of Hawkesbury, New South Wales, Australia. It was added to the New South Wales State Heritage Register on 2 April 1999.

== History ==
Mackenzie House was built c. 1915. At one stage it was used to house the rector of the adjacent Windsor Uniting Church.

It now houses a psychology and psychiatry practice.

== Heritage listing ==
Mackenzie House was listed on the New South Wales State Heritage Register on 2 April 1999.
