= Loder House =

Building in New South Wales, Australia

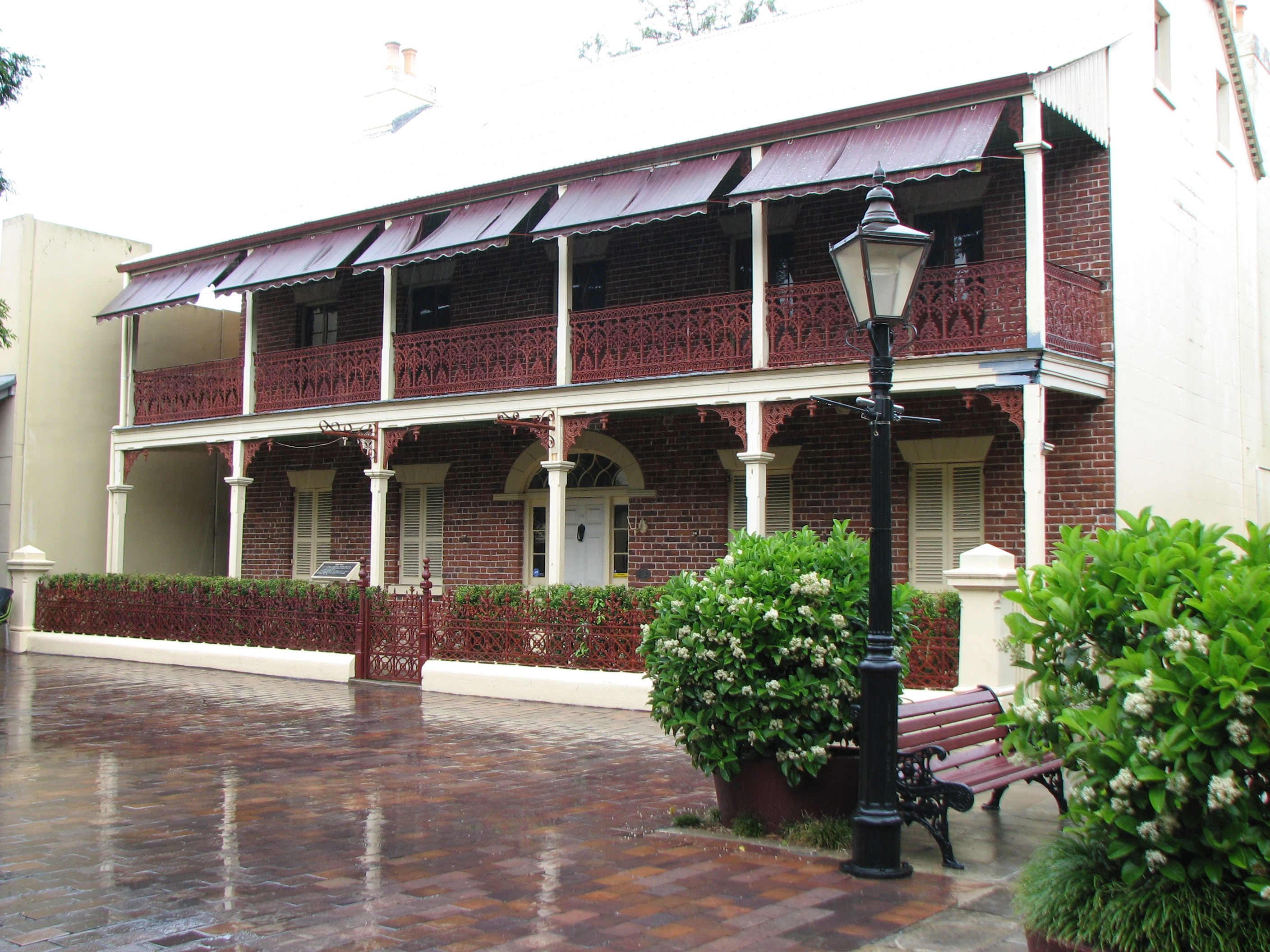

- Location within Sydney
- Alternative names: Lachlan's Restaurant; Governor's Choice

General information
- Status: Hawkesbury Remakery
- Type: Town house residence, bank, restaurant, guest house, residence
- Architectural style: Australian Georgian
- Location: 126–128 George Street, Windsor, Sydney, New South Wales, Australia
- Coordinates: 33°36′22″S 150°49′20″E
- Completed: 1834
- Client: George Loder

New South Wales Heritage Register
- Official name: Loder House
- Type: Built
- Criteria: a., b., c., d., e., f., g.
- Designated: 2 April 1999
- Reference no.: 00003

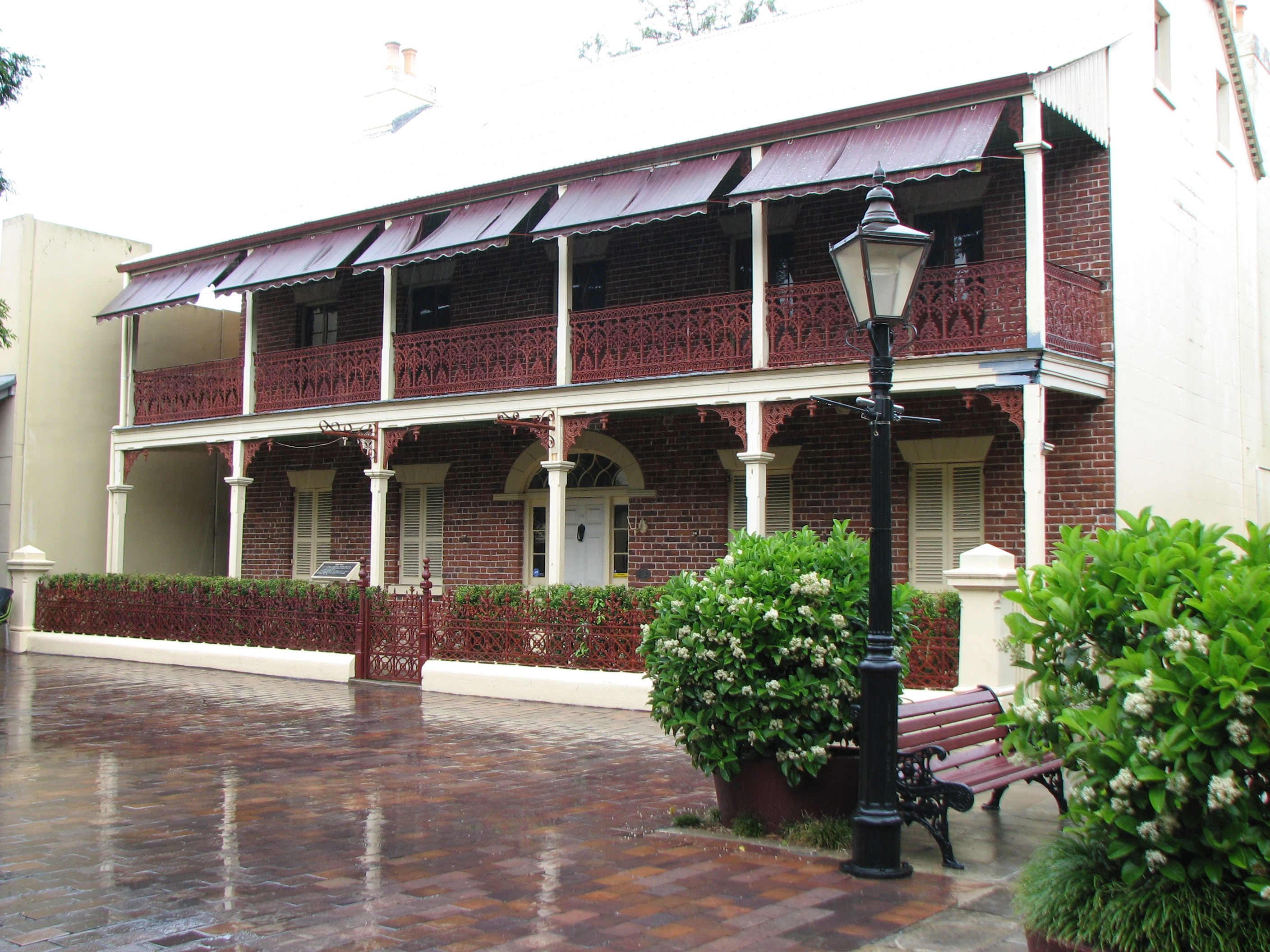
Loder House

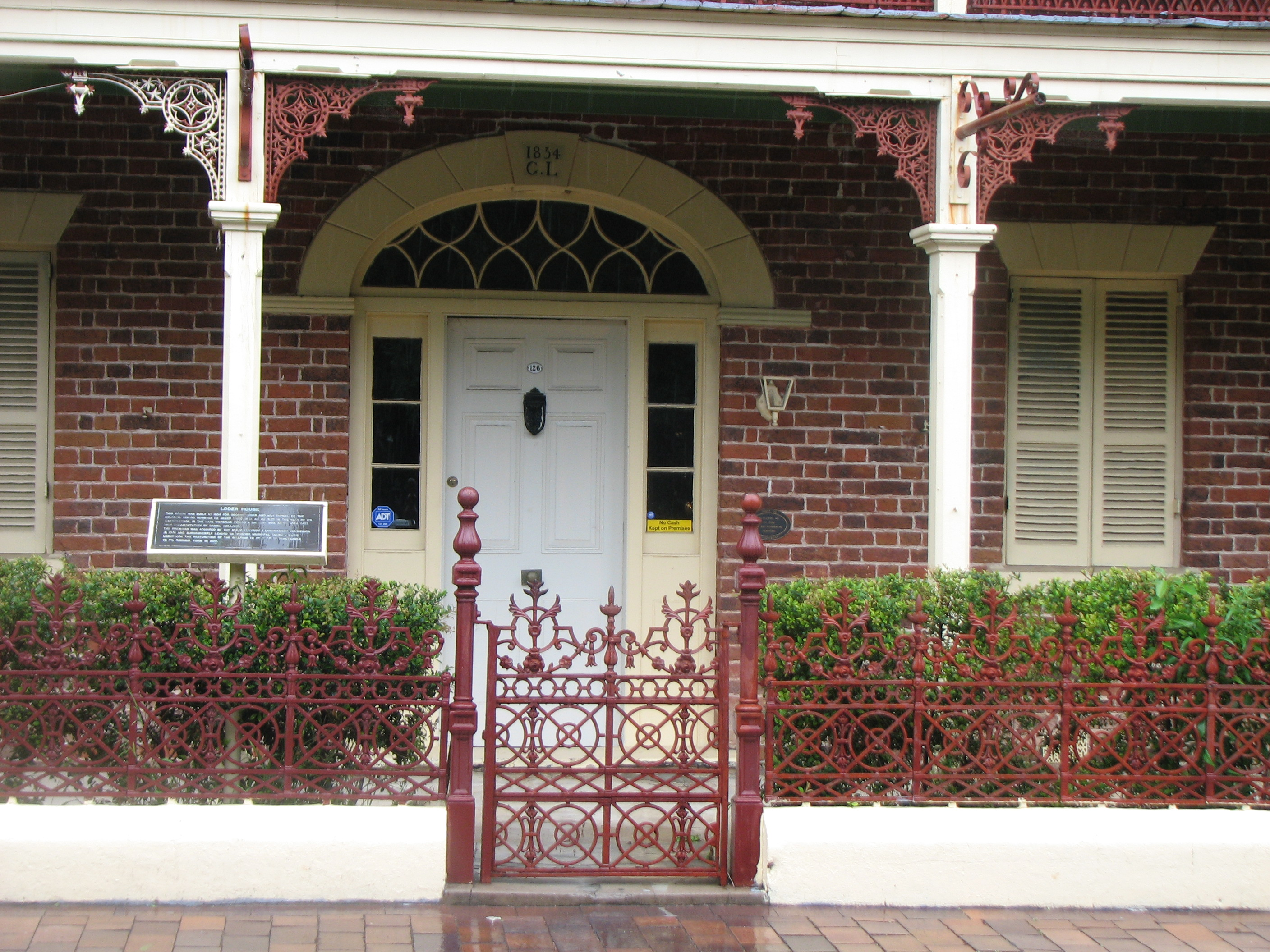
Loder House

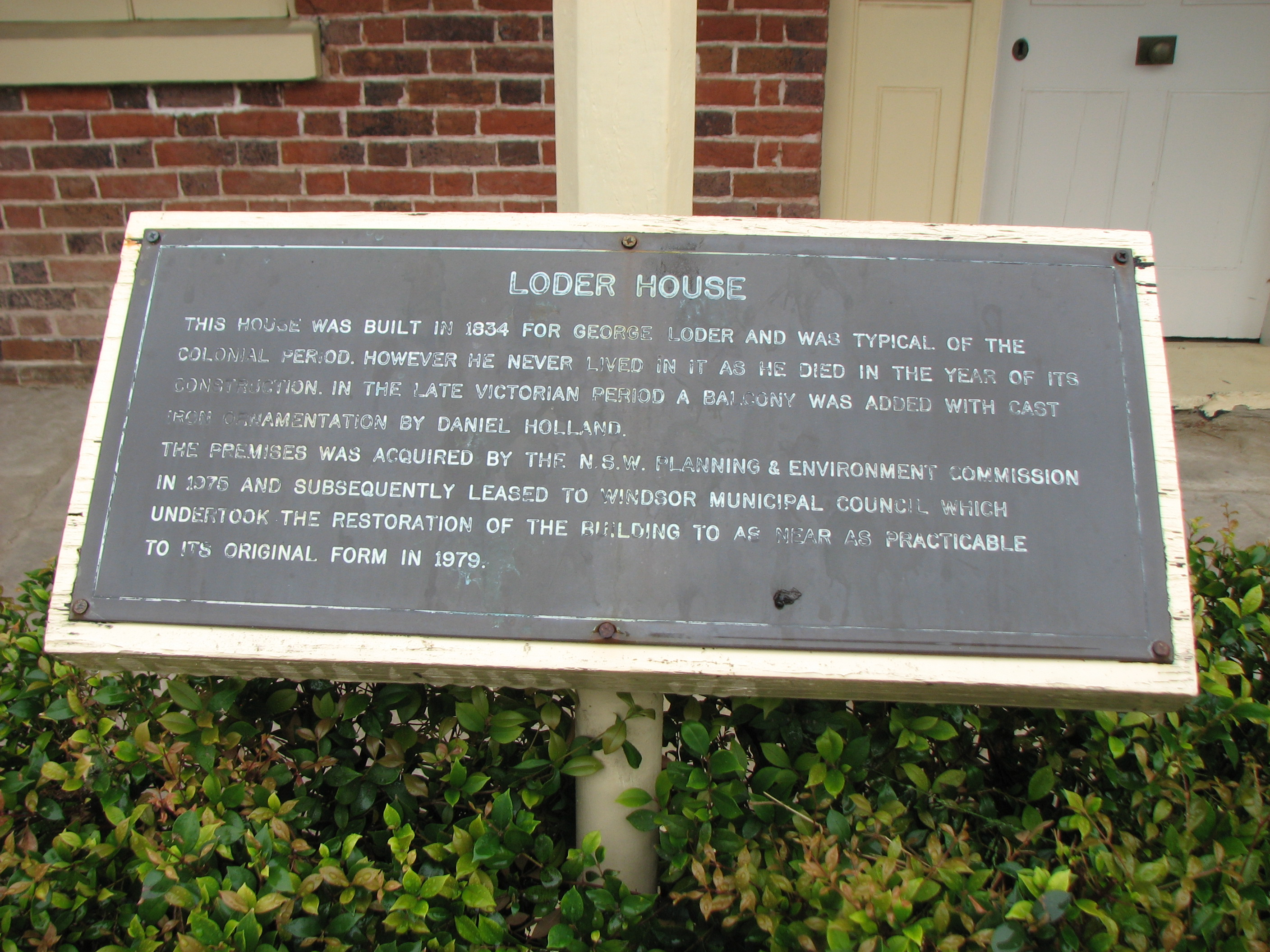
Plaque at front of Loder House

Loder House is a heritage-listed residence at 126 George Street, Windsor, City of Hawkesbury, New South Wales, Australia. It was built in 1834. It has been used at times for various other purposes: as a bank, multiple restaurants, a guesthouse and a bookshop. It was added to the New South Wales State Heritage Register on 2 April 1999.

== History ==
=== Indigenous occupation ===
The lower Hawkesbury was home to the Dharug people. The proximity to the Nepean River and South Creek qualifies it as a key area for food resources for indigenous groups. The Dharug and Darkinjung people called the river Deerubbin and it was a vital source of food and transport.

=== Early European colonisation ===
Governor Arthur Phillip explored the local area in search of suitable agricultural land in 1789 and discovered and named the Hawkesbury River after Baron Hawkesbury. This region played a significant role in the early development of the colony with European settlers established here by 1794. Situated on fertile floodplains and well known for its abundant agriculture, Green Hills (as it was originally called) supported the colony through desperate times. However, frequent flooding meant that the farmers along the riverbanks were often ruined.

The side of Loder House was first alienated for European purposes in a 1794 grant made by Francis Grose of thirty acres to Samuel Wilcox, who named it Wilcox Farm. It is likely that land clearance and agricultural activities as well as some building works took place during this period and during the subsequent of occupation. Wilcox Farm was incorporated into a larger holding of 1500 acres known as Peninsula Farm in the early 19th century.

On 1 January 1810, Lachlan Macquarie replaced William Bligh as Governor of New South Wales. Under Macquarie's influence, the colony prospered. Macquarie's vision was for a free community of white people, working in conjunction with the penal colony. He implemented an unrivaled public works program, completing 265 public buildings, establishing new public amenities and improving existing services such as roads. Under his leadership Hawkesbury district thrived. On 6 December 1810, Macquarie recorded in his journal that on that day he had named what were to become the five Macquarie Towns in the Hawkesbury district. Following Macquarie's proclamation, Windsor became a more permanent township with streets, a town square and public buildings.

=== Loder House ===
Loder House was built in 1834 for George Loder Jnr., a prosperous farmer and merchant. Loder was the son of a soldier who came to Australia from India. In 1819, George Jnr., married Mary Ann Howe. They were successful in their farming pursuits, and decided to move to the township of Windsor and open a butcher's store. They commenced to build a grand townhouse shortly after establishing their business. They built Loder House in the main street of Windsor to house their large young family.

In addition to his farming activities, George Jnr had accompanied his father George Snr and his younger brother Andrew on a number of explorations of the Hunter District, discovering and exploring the Singleton district. They were also given several grants of land at Singleton.

Loder died in 1834, aged 38, never having lived in his grand house. He was buried in the family vault at St Matthew's Anglican Church. He left the house in trust to Mary Ann and his younger brother. In 1835 Mary Ann married her widowed brother in law Thomas Dargin II who also had a large young family and together they took up residence in the George Street house, which became known as Loder's House. Thomas Dargin died in 1843 and Mary Ann remarried in 1846 to Laban White, an auctioneer and prominent citizen of Windsor. They continued to live at Loder House until the death of White in 1873, whereupon Mary Ann went to live with relatives in Singleton, where she died in 1882.

The house was subsequently used as a branch of the Commercial Bank of New South Wales from 1874 to 1889, with the upper and rear section used as a residence for the manager. The building was purchased in 1889 by Benjamin Richards and once more became a family residence. In 1893 Richards sold the property to Daniel Holland, another prosperous merchant in the town. He and his family lived there for some years and were responsible for the handsome cast iron lacework and stone walling which replaced an earlier pallisade fence. Holland conducted a successful drapery business in Windsor but eventually left the district in 1906.

From 1923 to 1940 the building was used as a boarding house by Reginald Wilbow.

In 1955 the property was transferred to Thomas Ogden, Thomas Cragg and William John and in 1962 to Norbert Cleary who held it until 1973 when it was partially gutted by fire. It was then purchased by Pacific Investments who applied to demolish the building and redevelop the site with a modern office block. The proposal met with such strong public opposition that the Department of Planning and Environment purchased the property in 1975 to ensure its conservation.

The building has been associated with several prominent local identities including members of the Loder, Dargin, White, Richards and Holland families.

The building was restored under a National Estate Programme Grant by architects Fisher Lucas and leased to Hawkesbury Shire Council. A Permanent Conservation Order was made over the property in 1978 by the Minister for Planning and Environment under advice from the Heritage Council of NSW and the order was gazetted on 14 December 1979. This covered the land, the house, the brick outbuilding and boundary fence and it was only the 3rd made in New South Wales under the Heritage Act 1977.

It has been used for a variety of uses since its acquisition by the state government, including various now-closed restaurants ("Lachlan's Restaurant", "Governor's Choice" and "The Linden"), as a boarding house, and for many years as a bookshop. It was sold in November 2006, and was vacant and advertised for lease in August 2017.

== Description ==
Loder House is an 1834 two-storey brick Georgian townhouse with attic and later Victorian two storey timber verandah with cast iron lacework balustrades and verandah brackets.

The upper floor has five symmetrically placed French Doors with stone voussoirs, opening onto the verandah, whilst the ground floor has paired windows with stone voussoirs and sills, flanking a central entrance with an arched fanlight.

The main facade is of face sandstock whilst the side walls have been rendered. The 1975 National Trust (NSW) listing said that at that time the street facade was stuccoed, the remainder of the external walls face brick.

The corrugated iron roof has been replaced when the building was restored.

The verandah is stone flagged.

The grounds contain an 1830s boundary wall and an unusual square outbuilding which dates from the time of construction of Loder House.

Some stone flagging survives in the rear yard.

The townhouse today has frontage to the Windsor pedestrian mall.

The building appears to be in excellent condition and was restored in 1975. The site has some archaeological potential, particularly in the grounds surrounding the outbuilding, whose original purpose is unclear. The house is substantially intact, despite it nearly being burnt down.

== Heritage listing ==
Loder House is a rare intact two-storey brick Georgian townhouse, located in the main street of Windsor. The building has been associated with several prominent local identities including members of the Loder, Dargin, White, Richards and Holland families. The grounds of the house contain an 1830s boundary wall and an unusual square outbuilding which dates from the construction of the house.

Loder House was listed on the New South Wales State Heritage Register on 2 April 1999 having satisfied the following criteria.

The place is important in demonstrating the course, or pattern, of cultural or natural history in New South Wales.

Loder House is of high regional historical significance for its association with the Loder Family, an early prominent Windsor family, and for its association with the development of the town of Windsor in relation to both its residential and commercial development.

The place has a strong or special association with a person, or group of persons, of importance of cultural or natural history of New South Wales's history.

The building has been associated with several prominent local identities including members of the Loder, Dargin, White, Richards and Holland families.

The place is important in demonstrating aesthetic characteristics and/or a high degree of creative or technical achievement in New South Wales.

Loder House has high regional and state aesthetic significance as a rare surviving two storey Georgian townhouse. It is one of few such intact houses in the Windsor district and makes a fine contribution to the main streetscape of Windsor.

The place has strong or special association with a particular community or cultural group in New South Wales for social, cultural or spiritual reasons.

Loder House has high regional social significance for its association with an early prominent Windsor family and also through its commercial use as a bank during the mid-nineteenth century.

The place has potential to yield information that will contribute to an understanding of the cultural or natural history of New South Wales.

Loder House has high technical/research significance for its demonstration of early nineteenth-century building techniques and the pattern of domestic life at this time.

The place possesses uncommon, rare or endangered aspects of the cultural or natural history of New South Wales.

Very few large Georgian town houses survive in the Sydney region, and this is one of the more intact.

The place is important in demonstrating the principal characteristics of a class of cultural or natural places/environments in New South Wales.

Loder House represents the residential development of the first towns ('Macquarie Towns') beyond Sydney and Parramatta.

== See also ==
- Australian residential architectural styles
