= 5 Thompson Square, Windsor =

5 Thompson Square
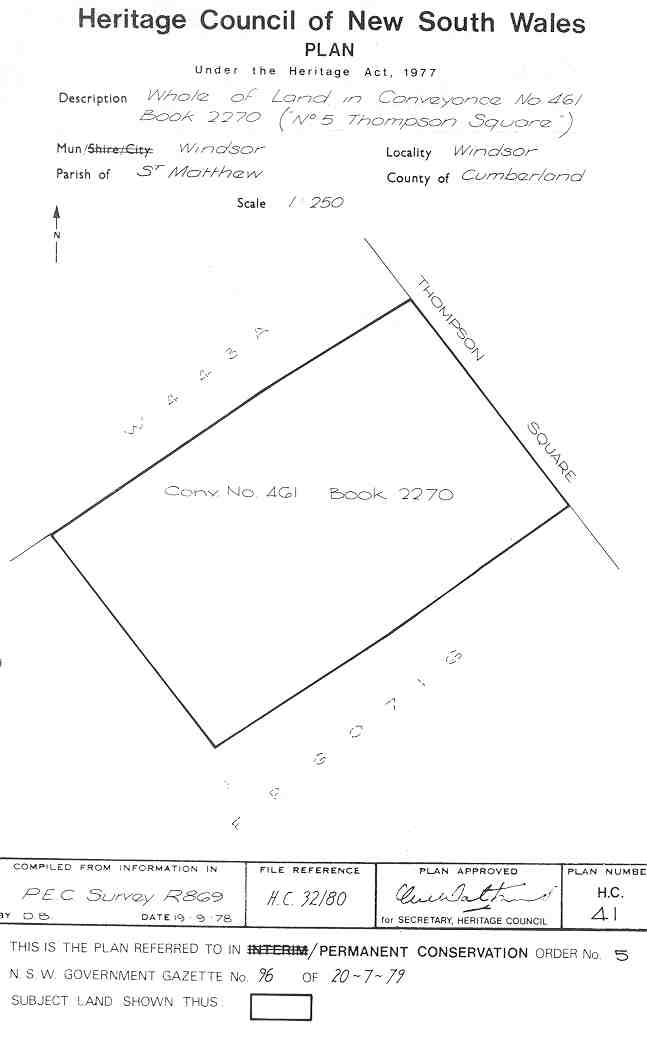
- Heritage boundaries

- Location within Sydney Location within Australia
- 33°36′16″S 150°49′21″E
- Location: 5 Thompson Square, Windsor, City of Hawkesbury, New South Wales, Australia

New South Wales Heritage Register
- Official name: House & Outbuildings
- Type: State heritage (complex / group)
- Designated: 2 April 1999
- Reference no.: 5
- Type: House
- Category: Residential buildings (private)

5 Thompson Square is a heritage-listed residence and now offices at 5 Thompson Square, Windsor, City of Hawkesbury, New South Wales, Australia. It was added to the New South Wales State Heritage Register on 2 April 1999.

== History ==
It was built in 1852 by John Cunningham. It was acquired by the State Planning Authority in 1970 in order to protect its historic interest, as an early conservation measure prior to the existence of heritage listing. It was restored by its then-owner, the Department of Planning and Environment, in 1972.

It is now used as a medical practice.

== Description ==
It is a brick Georgian single storey cottage of three bays with a slate roof and timber verandah. The front door has been altered and replaced and the ridges altered, but otherwise the building appears original. A timber outbuilding is also heritage-listed.

It is an authentic early cottage which maintains the colonial character of Thompson Square. It is located in the Thompson Square Conservation Area.

== Heritage listing ==
5 Thompson Square was listed on the New South Wales State Heritage Register on 2 April 1999.
