= Windsor Police Station Stables =

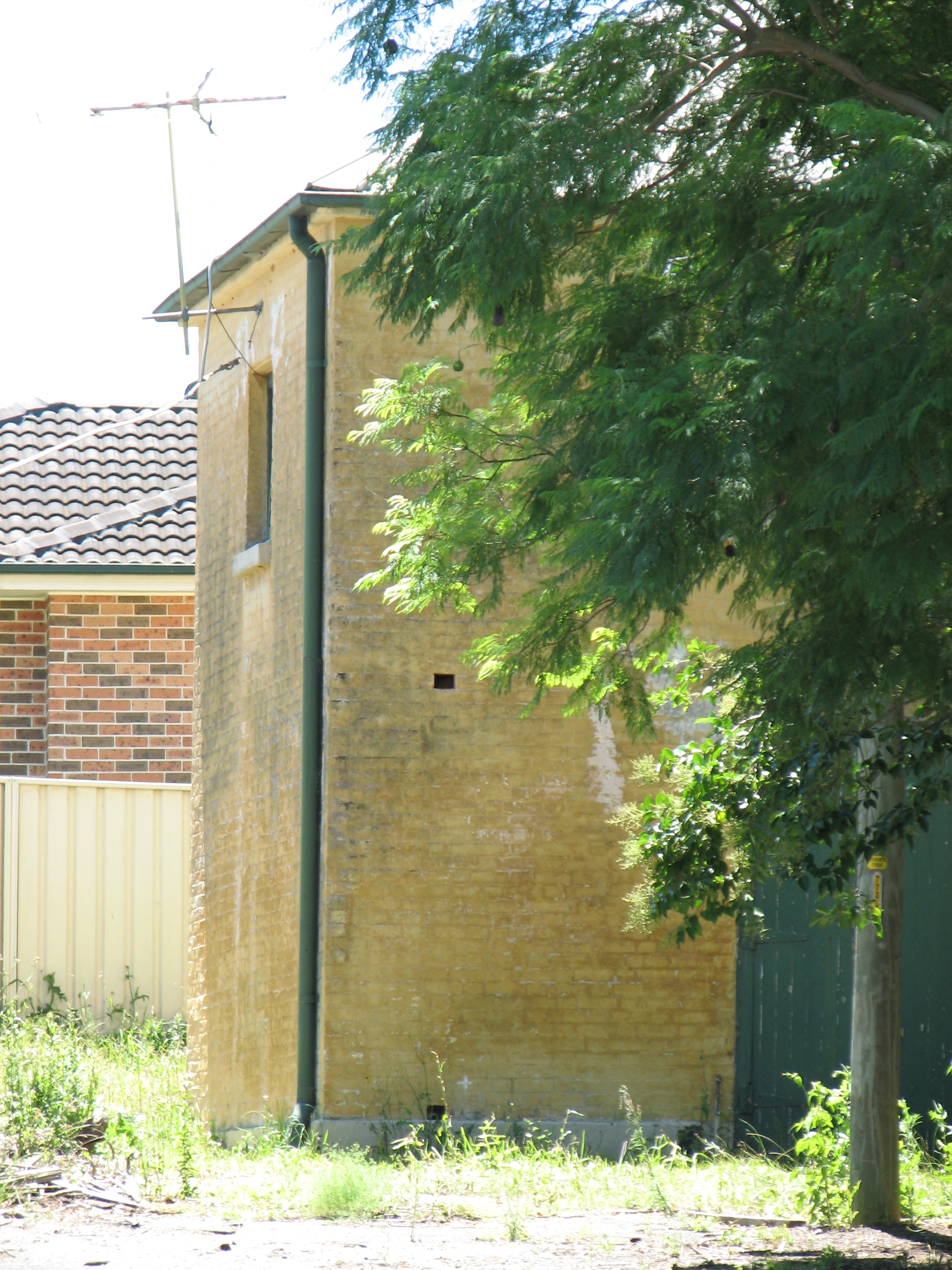
- Heritage boundaries

- Location within New South Wales Location within Australia
- 33.6052°S 150.8251°E
- Location: 32–34 Bridge Street, Windsor, City of Hawkesbury, New South Wales, Australia

History
- Built: 1836–

Site notes
- Owner: NSW Police Service

New South Wales Heritage Register
- Official name: Stables at rear of Police Station
- Type: state heritage (built)
- Designated: 2 April 1999
- Reference no.: 1018
- Type: Barracks & housing
- Category: Defence
- Builders: Major Barney

Windsor Police Station Stables is a heritage-listed former military barracks and now police building at 32–34 Bridge Street, Windsor, City of Hawkesbury, New South Wales, Australia. It was built in 1836 by Major Barney. The property is owned by the New South Wales Police. It was added to the New South Wales State Heritage Register on 2 April 1999.

== History ==
The remains of the Windsor Military Barracks comprise some ruins, walling and buildings constructed between c. 1818 and occupied by 1820 with additions in the 1830s and 1840s.

This building was constructed in 1836 by Major Barney and used as the Mounted Police Barracks.

== Description ==
It is a two-storey building designed in the colonial Georgian style, with a sandstock brick exterior.

=== Modifications and dates ===
- 1818–1820: Windsor Military Barracks established
- 1830–1840: Additions
- 1836: Present building constructed.

== Heritage listing ==
The Windsor Police Station Stables, originally a military barracks building, remains as a part of an important outpost of the earliest colonial government provision of law and order.

Windsor Police Station Stables was listed on the New South Wales State Heritage Register on 2 April 1999.
