= Johnston Street terraces =

Johnston Street Group
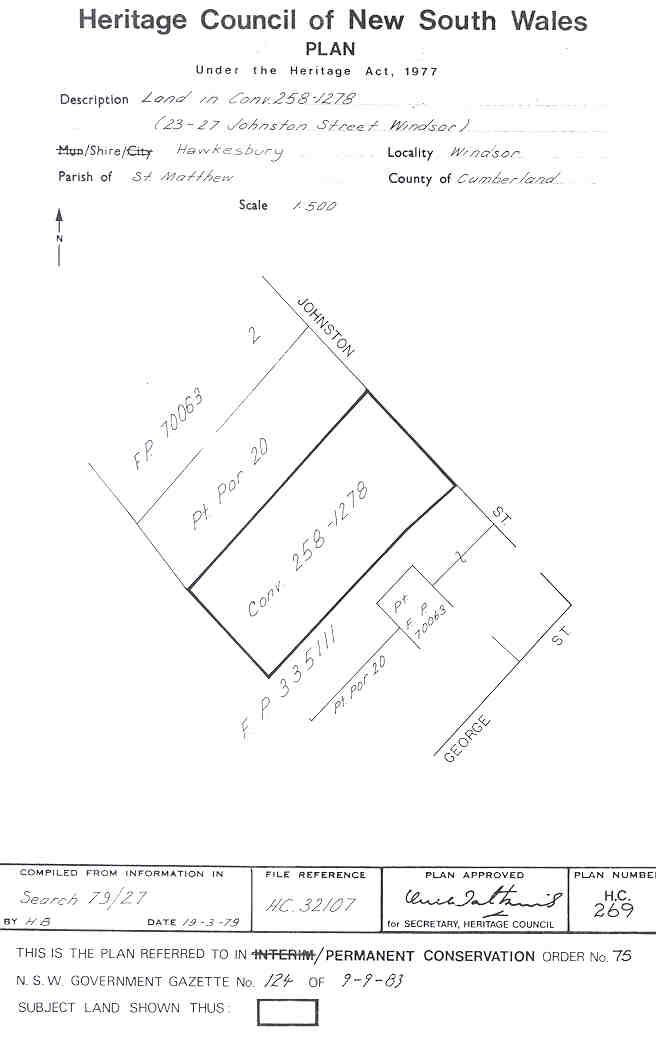
- Heritage boundaries

- Location within Sydney Location within Australia
- 33°36′24″S 150°49′10″E
- Location: 23–27 Johnston Street, Windsor, City of Hawkesbury, New South Wales, Australia

New South Wales Heritage Register
- Official name: Terrace Building
- Type: State heritage (built)
- Designated: 2 April 1999
- Reference no.: 75
- Type: Terrace
- Category: Residential buildings (private)

The Johnston Street terraces consists of heritage-listed attached terraced houses located at 23–27 Johnston Street, Windsor, City of Hawkesbury, New South Wales, Australia. It was added to the New South Wales State Heritage Register on 2 April 1999.

== History ==
The terraces were built c. 1840. They were converted into a medical centre in 1984.

The building was advertised for sale in 2018.

== Description ==
The building consists of a two-storey sandstock brick terrace of three houses, with a hipped iron roof and boxed eaves. The ground floor verandah is continuous along the street facade, and supported on elegant turned timber Doric columns. It features double-hung windows with six pane sashes and six-panel doors with rectangular fanlights. There are flat brick lintels to openings and sandstone sills. There are three bay windows on the ground floor and two bays at the first floor to each house.

== Heritage listing ==
The Johnston Street terraces were listed on the New South Wales State Heritage Register on 2 April 1999.
