= Reverend Turner Cottage =

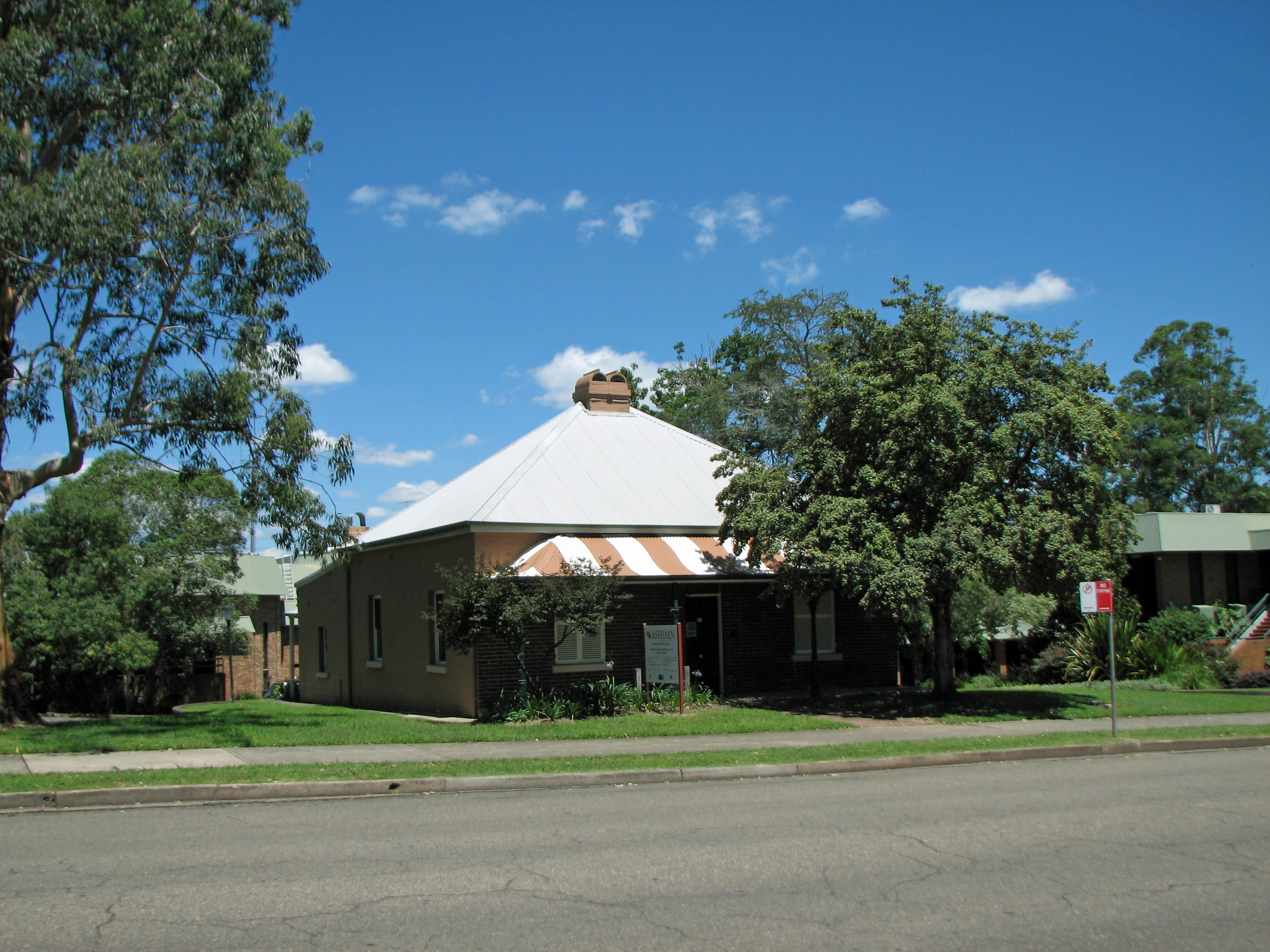
- Reverend Turner Cottage, 360 George Street, Windsor, NSW

- Location within Sydney Location within Australia
- 33°36′40″S 150°48′54″E
- Location: 360 George Street, Windsor, City of Hawkesbury, New South Wales, Australia

Site notes
- Owner: Hawkesbury City Council

New South Wales Heritage Register
- Official name: Rev. Peter Turner Cottage and Well; Oxalis Cottage
- Type: State heritage (complex / group)
- Designated: 2 April 1999
- Reference no.: 202
- Type: Presbytery/Rectory/ Vicarage/Manse
- Category: Religion

Reverend Turner Cottage is a heritage-listed clergy house at 360 George Street, Windsor, City of Hawkesbury, New South Wales, Australia. It is also known as Rev. Peter Turner Cottage and Oxalis Cottage. The property is owned by Hawkesbury City Council. It was added to the New South Wales State Heritage Register on 2 April 1999.

== History ==
The cottage was built for Wesleyan missionary Reverend Peter Turner. It was threatened with demolition in the 1970s, but was saved after community opposition. It was purchased by the former Municipality of Windsor in 1976 and restored in 1980.

It is now leased to an accounting practice by the Hawkesbury City Council.

== Heritage listing ==
Reverend Turner Cottage was listed on the New South Wales State Heritage Register on 2 April 1999.
