= Macquarie Arms Hotel =

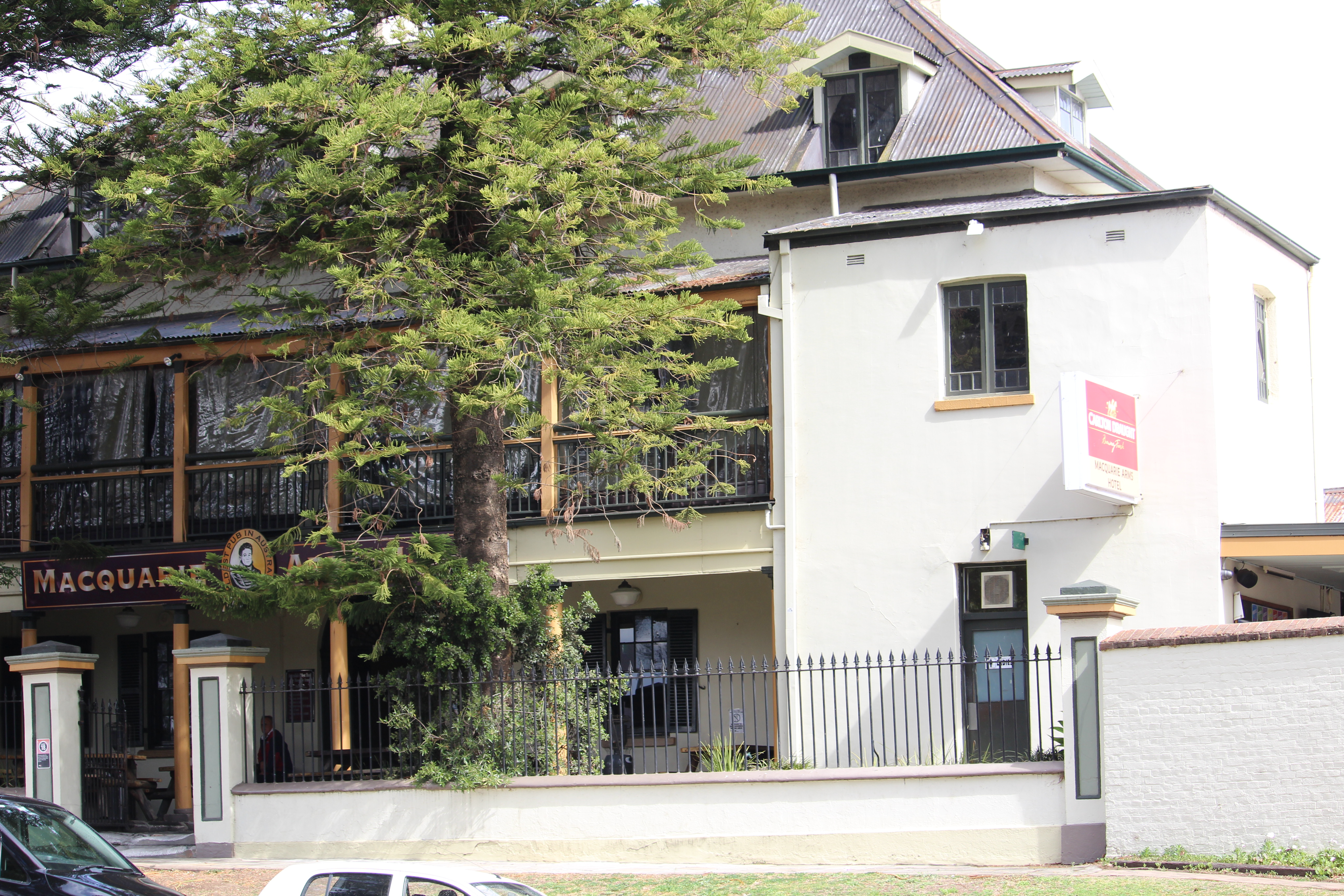
- Macquarie Arms Hotel, Windsor

- Location within New South Wales Location within Australia
- 33.6048°S 150.8228°E
- Location: Thompson Square, Windsor, City of Hawkesbury, New South Wales, Australia

New South Wales Heritage Register
- Official name: Macquarie Arms Hotel; Royal Hotel
- Type: state heritage (built)
- Designated: 2 April 1999
- Reference no.: 41
- Type: Hotel
- Category: Commercial

Macquarie Arms Hotel is a heritage-listed hotel at Thompson Square in Windsor, New South Wales, Australia. It is also known as the Royal Hotel. It was added to the New South Wales State Heritage Register on 2 April 1999.

== History ==
Governor Arthur Phillip explored the local area in search of suitable agricultural land in 1789 and discovered and named the Hawkesbury River after Baron Hawkesbury. This region played a significant role in the early development of the colony with European settlers established here by 1794. Situated on fertile floodplains and well known for its abundant agriculture, Green Hills (as it was originally called) supported the colony through desperate times. However, frequent flooding meant that the farmers along the riverbanks were often ruined.

In 1794, a broader area in modern-day Windsor including the hotel site was first alienated for European purposes in a grant made by Francis Grose of thirty acres to Samuel Wilcox, who named it Wilcox Farm. It is likely that land clearance and agricultural activities as well as some building works took place during this period and during the subsequent of occupation. It was incorporated into a larger holding of 1500 acres known as Peninsula Farm in the early nineteenth century.

On 1 January 1810, Governor Lachlan Macquarie replaced Governor Bligh. Under Macquarie's influence the colony prospered. His vision was for a free community for white colonists, working in conjunction with the penal colony. He implemented an unrivalled public works program, completing 265 public buildings, establishing new public amenities and improving existing services such as roads. Under his leadership Hawkesbury district thrived. He visited the district on his first tour and recorded in his journal on 6/12/1810: "After dinner I chrestened the new townships...I gave the name of Windsor to the town intended to be erected in the district of the Green Hills...the township in the Richmond district I have named Richmond..." the district reminded Macquarie of those towns in England, whilst Castlereagh, Pitt Town and Wilberforce were named after English statesmen. These are often referred to as Macquarie's Five Towns. Their localities, chiefly Windsor and Richmond, became more permanent with streets, town square and public buildings.

Macquarie also appointed local men in positions of authority. In 1810 a group of settlers sent a letter to him congratulating him on his leadership and improvements. It was published in the Sydney Gazette with his reply. He was "much pleased with the sentiments" of the letter and assured them that the Hawkesbury would "always be an object of the greatest interest" to him.

In marking out the towns of Windsor and Richmond in 1810, Governor Macquarie was acting on instructions from London. All of the Governors who held office between 1789 and 1822, from Phillip to Brisbane, received the same Letter of Instruction regarding the disposal of the "waste lands of the Crown" that Britain claimed as her own. This included directives for the formation of towns and thus the extension of British civilisation to its Antipodean outpost.

On 15 July 1815, the Sydney Gazette carried the following public notice:

"A large and commodious House having been some time since erected, and lately completed, at a very considerable expense, in the Town of Windsor, for an Inn; and a suitable person having been engaged by the Proprietor for keeping the same, Notice is hereby given, that the said Inn, called "The Macquarie Arms", and kept by Thomas Ranson, who formerly was an Innkeeper in England, will be opened for the accommodation of the Public on Monday the 31st of this present Month of July".

The hotel was opened two weeks later by Governor Macquarie.

The hotel, also known as the Royal Hotel, was envisioned by Governor Macquarie following his tour of the district in 1811. Governor Macquarie wrote about the event in his diary:-

"I gave Mr. Fitzgerald a large allotment in the square on the express condition of his building immediately thereon a handsome commodious inn of brick or stone and to be at least two stories high..".

Richard Fitzgerald, who built the Macquarie Arms Inn, had arrived in New South Wales in 1791 as a convict, as had Andrew Thompson, whose name is remembered in Thompson Square. In 1800 Governor Hunter made Fitzgerald superintendent of Agriculture in Toongabbie. He had proved himself a good farmer in the cultivation of his 1794 grant of 190 acres. Richard Fitzgerald and his family lived in a house alongside the Macquarie Arms Hotel in George Street, Windsor.

The hotel was occupied in the late 1830s by army officers stationed at Windsor and it became known as the Mess House and referred to as such in Armstrong's map of the town (1842).

From 1872 to 1900 it was once again run as a hotel by the Bushell family. It continues to be run as a hotel to the present day. Its central position in Windsor and its early date and interesting associations make The Macquarie Arms a colonial building of some importance.

== Description ==
The hotel is a building of generous proportions, with sandstock brick walls, stuccoed over and painted white. It has two large Georgian doorways with semi-circular traceried fanlights and sidelights, but the glass in the one facing George Street has unfortunately been painted over. The one opening onto Thompson Square can still be seen in its original state. The hotel retains its well designed cedar joinery, its cedar circular staircase, its extensive stone flagged cellars, its turned wooden verandah columns, and its stone flagging.

The early character of the architecture of the building was somewhat belied around the 1930s by the addition of box-like protuberances to the corners of the building. The upstairs verandah has also been added and some upstairs windows replaced by French doors. Most of the attic windows in the roof were also added then. Despite the alterations, the building still possesses a great deal of its former atmosphere.

The hotel is located in the Thompson Square Conservation Area.

== Heritage listing ==
Opened in 1815 and constructed by emancipist Richard Fitzgerald in response to specific directions from Governor Macquarie, the Macquarie Arms Hotel is of exceptional significance as the most sophisticated and most intact major commercial building dating to the pre-1820 colonial period of Australia's history. Playing a pivotal role in Macquarie's town plan for Windsor, the Macquarie Arms Hotel is the most substantial building to form part of Thompson Square, the best Georgian town square on mainland Australia. The building contains numerous rare and aesthetically superior elements, and continues to be widely recognised for its importance to the understanding of settlement, urban design, and architecture during the colonial period, while its historic associations carry strong cultural messages of the period's society and government. It has been long established by art and architectural historians, and has a prominent place in the contemporary social life of Windsor.

Macquarie Arms Hotel was listed on the New South Wales State Heritage Register on 2 April 1999 having satisfied the following criteria.

The place has a strong or special association with a person, or group of persons, of importance of cultural or natural history of New South Wales's history.

The Macquarie Arms Hotel is closely associated with a number of significant social and political figures in the Hawkesbury District during the period of its early development. The building of the hotel was an express condition by Governor Macquarie of his grant of a large allotment of land to Richard Fitzgerald. The hotel was built to specific requirements made by Governor Macquarie that the inn be handsome, commodious, of brick or stone and to be at least two stories high.

The allotment of land - and subsequently the situation of the hotel - was in Thompson Square, named by Governor Macquarie in honour of Andrew Thompson Esqr, Justice of the Peace and Principal Magistrate of the district, and reputed as the father or founder of Green Hills. Andrew Thompson had arrived in NSW as a convict.

Richard Fitzgerald, who promptly built the hotel in accordance with Governor Macquarie's specifications, had arrived as a convict in New South Wales in 1791. By 1800 Fitzgerald had been appointed by Governor Hunter as superintendent of agriculture in Toongabbie, and in 1810 Governor Macquarie appointed him Government Storekeeper.

Fitzgerald appears to have retired from public office in the 1820s. The 1828 census lists him as the possessor of 2000 acres of land, and in conjunction with his farming pursuits, he remained active in local affairs and was elected president of the Hawkesbury Benevolent Society which managed the hospital at Windsor.

Richard Fitzgerald and his family lived in a house alongside the Macquarie Arms in George Street, Windsor. His son, Robert, married Elizabeth Rouse of Rouse Hill in 1841, and in 1843 stood for the first partly elected parliament in New South Wales against William Bowman of Richmond.

== See also ==
- List of oldest companies in Australia
