= Windsor Uniting Church and Hall =

Windsor Uniting Church
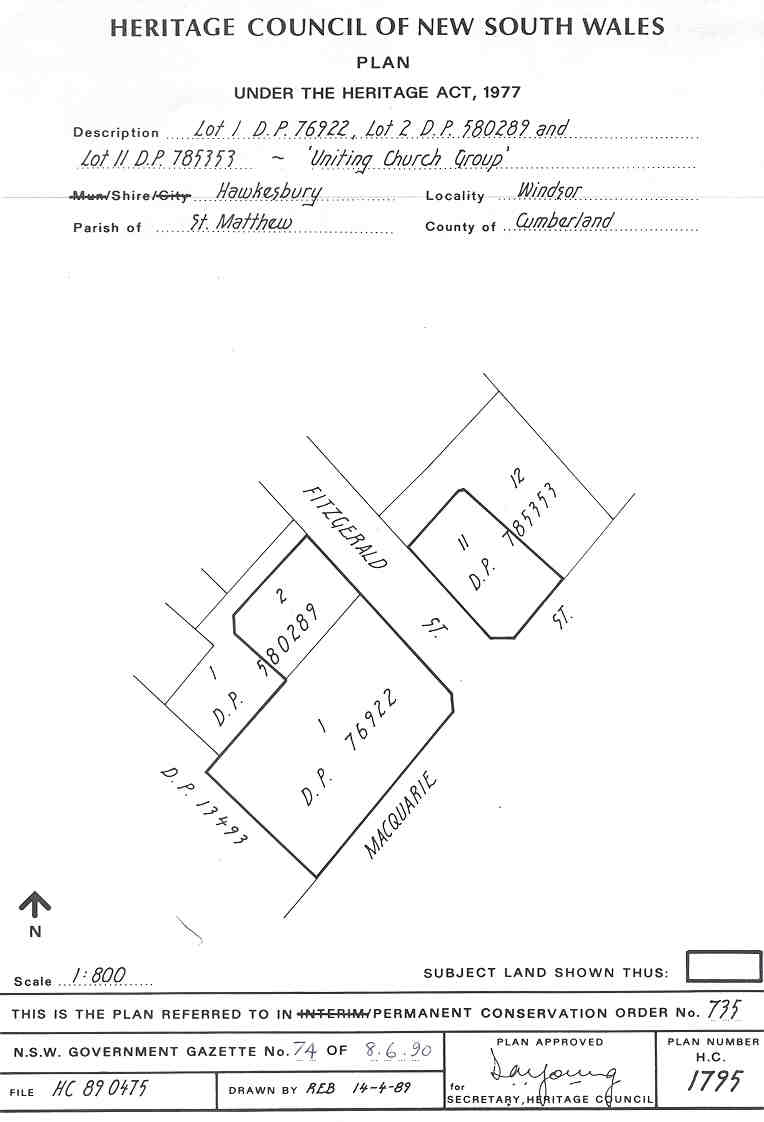
- Heritage boundaries of the church and hall

- Location in greater Sydney
- 33°36′27″S 150°49′15″E
- Location: Macquarie Street, Windsor, City of Hawkesbury, New South Wales
- Country: Australia
- Denomination: Uniting
- Previous denomination: Methodism
- Website: www.windsoruniting.org.au

History
- Status: Church

Architecture
- Functional status: Active
- Architectural type: Church and hall
- Style: Victorian Gothic revival
- Years built: 1861–1876

Administration
- District: Hawkesbury Regional Zone

New South Wales Heritage Register
- Official name: Uniting Church and Hall; Uniting Church Group
- Type: State heritage (complex / group)
- Designated: 2 April 1999
- Reference no.: 735
- Type: Church
- Category: Religion

Windsor Uniting Church and Hall is a heritage-listed church precinct at Macquarie Street, Windsor, City of Hawkesbury, New South Wales, Australia. The church was built in 1875–76 following the destruction of the original church in a fire, while the Church Hall, which survived the fire, dates from 1861. Originally a Methodist church, it became part of the Uniting Church in Australia following the Methodist Church's amalgamation in 1977. It was added to the New South Wales State Heritage Register on 2 April 1999.

== History ==
The lower Hawkesbury was home to the Dharug people. The proximity to the Nepean River and South Creek qualifies it as a key area for food resources for indigenous groups. The Dharug and Darkinjung people called the river Deerubbin and it was a vital source of food and transport.

Governor Arthur Phillip explored the local area in search of suitable agricultural land in 1789 and discovered and named the Hawkesbury River after Baron Hawkesbury. This region played a significant role in the early development of the colony with European settlers established here by 1794. Situated on fertile floodplains and well known for its abundant agriculture, Green Hills (as it was originally called) supported the colony through desperate times. However, frequent flooding meant that the farmers along the riverbanks were often ruined.

In 1794, the land on which the church precinct stands was first alienated for European purposes in a grant made by Francis Grose of thirty acres to Samuel Wilcox, who named it Wilcox Farm. It is likely that land clearance and agricultural activities as well as some building works took place during this period and during the subsequent of occupation. In the early nineteenth century, it was incorporated into a large holding of 1500 acres known as Peninsula Farm.

Lachlan Macquarie replaced William Bligh as Governor of New South Wales on 1 January 1810. The colony prospered under his influence, and he initiated a public works program with 265 public buildings, new public amenities, and improving existing services such as roads. On 6 December 1810, he named the five Macquarie Towns to be erected in the Hawkesbury district: Richmond, Widnsor, Castlereagh, Pitt Town and Wilberforce. Following his proclamation, Windsor became a permanent town with streets, public buildings and a town square.

The original Methodist Church on the site, built in 1838–39, was destroyed by a disastrous fire which ravaged this part of the town in 1894.

The current church was built in 1875–76, and is considered to be one of the finest examples extant of this type of Victorian non-conformist church.

The present site on the corner of Macquarie and Fitzgerald Streets comprises the Uniting Church Church, the church hall, the former parsonage (on the opposite side of Fitzgerald Street) and a house at No. 29 Fitzgerald Street.

== Description ==
=== Church (1875–76) ===
The church was built in 1875–76 as a result of the fire which destroyed almost a whole block of the town on 23 December 1874. The original Methodist church (1838–39) was destroyed but the schoolhouse (1861) miraculously survived. The church is a fine example of Victorian non-conformist Gothic revival architecture. It is built of rendered brick with Gothic detailing, consists of nave, vestry and porch, and has a steep slate roof. Most of the fittings are original and there is a marble memorial to the pioneer Wesleyan missionary, the Rev. Peter Turner (1803–73), who was associated with Windsor for the last twenty years of his life.

The roof and foundations have suffered some damage by the 25 year old pine trees within three metres of the church building. At the time of heritage listing, the condition of the slate roof had been deteriorating for the last 10 years. The exterior of the church building is also suffering from age and weather damage to painted surfaces and spires etc.

Deteriorated condition of the church fabric, its roof stormwater drainage system, rising damp and falling damp deterioration, breaking down of the external paint particularly on the exposed parapets.

=== Church Hall (1861) ===
The hall is a small, simple, rendered brick hall built in 1861 as a Methodist Schoolhouse. It is designed in the Colonial Georgian tradition, with a gabled corrugated iron roof, 12 pane windows, stone cills, doors with transom lights and simple heavy pilasters at the corners of the front elevation topped by curious conical decorations

This is one of only a small number of Windsor's early 19th century buildings, being a remnant of the great fire that wiped out many of the buildings within Windsor township, including the former Church building.

=== Church Yard ===
The church yard comprises land fronting Fitzgerald and Macquarie Streets, and O'Briens Lane to the south. A retaining wall faces Macquarie Street, with lawn on its raised surface, on which the site's built elements sit.

Some trees are arrayed on the site, including a jacaranda at the south-west near the hall (Jacaranda mimosifolia), two crepe myrtles (Lagerstroemia indica: one west of the church, the other to its north-east near the corner of Fitzgerald and Macquarie Streets) and two others: one in the site's south-east corner near the Church Hall's eastern wall, the other north and slightly west of the church's porch entry.

== Heritage listing ==
The group is considered to be an important item of the State's environmental heritage because of its historic and social associations with the development of the town of Windsor. Its architectural value as examples of various architectural styles with curious stylistic idiosyncrasies. Its cultural significance as a group of buildings associated with the history of the Methodist Church in Windsor. Its aesthetic and landmark value as a group of buildings of great importance to the streetscape of Windsor, located in a prominent location on a major road.

Windsor Uniting Church and Hall was listed on the New South Wales State Heritage Register on 2 April 1999.

== See also ==
- List of Uniting churches in Sydney
