= Simmons Hardware Store =

Heritage-listed building in Hawkesbury, New South Wales, Australia

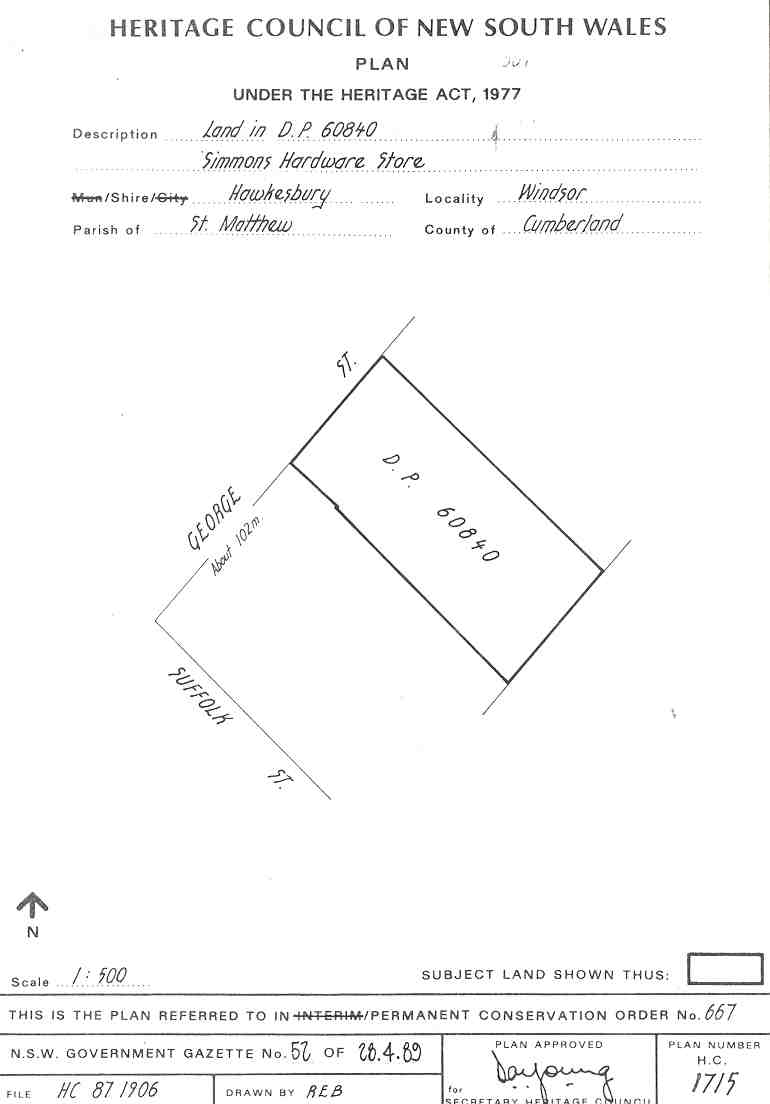
- Heritage boundaries

- Location within Sydney Location within Australia
- 33°36′28″S 150°49′11″E
- Location: 226 George Street, Windsor, City of Hawkesbury, New South Wales, Australia

Site notes
- Owner: Arabian Horse Society of Australia Ltd

New South Wales Heritage Register
- Official name: Simmons Hardware Store; Peter O'Hara's General Store; Simmons Store
- Type: State heritage (built)
- Designated: 2 April 1999
- Reference no.: 667
- Type: Shop
- Category: Retail and Wholesale

Simmons Hardware Store is a heritage-listed commercial building located at 226 George Street, Windsor, City of Hawkesbury, New South Wales, Australia. It is also known as Peter O'Hara's General Store and Simmons Store. It was added to the New South Wales State Heritage Register on 2 April 1999.

== History ==
226 George Street was built in the mid-nineteenth century. It housed a general store run by Peter O'Hara, a prominent local businessman. It weathered the great fire that ravaged Windsor in December 1874. The fire engulfed the building where the packing straw for O'Hara's goods of tin, earthenware and china was quickly fanned into flames and is believed to have destroyed all but the brick walls. A new store, or rebuilding of the earlier store, was completed shortly after. Although the detail of the building has undergone fabric manipulation and change over the 140 years it remains externally a surviving example of an early Victorian shop in an evolving streetscape.

More recently, a new single-storey storage outbuilding was built in the rear yard and was subject to an archaeological monitoring report by Siobhan Lavelle, c.1999-2000. The front facade was also changed from a suspended flat awning to a concave verandah with timber posts as recommended within the Windsor Streetscape Study 1986, which had been prepared by Noel Bell Ridley Smith and Partners.

== Description ==
226 George Street is an early Victorian two-storey commercial streetscape building constructed of sandstock brick in the mid-19th century. Gable end walls leading to prominent chimneys, symmetrical at the front with a single storey street verandah/awning supported by cantilevered steel pipe brackets off the wall and with timber posts (probably non-load-bearing). Below this verandah the walls have been cement-rendered, with ashlar markings, providing a marked change in appearance, together with two timber-framed shopfront picture windows and central doorway. The remainder of the street facade has three 12-pane windows along its second storey.

To the rear is an attached L-shaped skillion roof building linked to the ground floor rooms. The ground floor has a side entrance leading to the first-floor staircase and office accommodation. The resultant external character of the original sandstock brick building has been changed by it being painted entirely.

There is evidence of painted historic advertising signage is readily evident within the upper south-facing gable wall with the word "Castrol" showing through the painted layers in a curved format.

Although the detail of the building has undergone fabric manipulation and change over the 140 years it remains externally a surviving example of an early Victorian shop in an evolving streetscape.

== Heritage listing ==
Simmons Hardware Store was listed on the New South Wales State Heritage Register on 2 April 1999.
