= Windsor Methodist Parsonage =

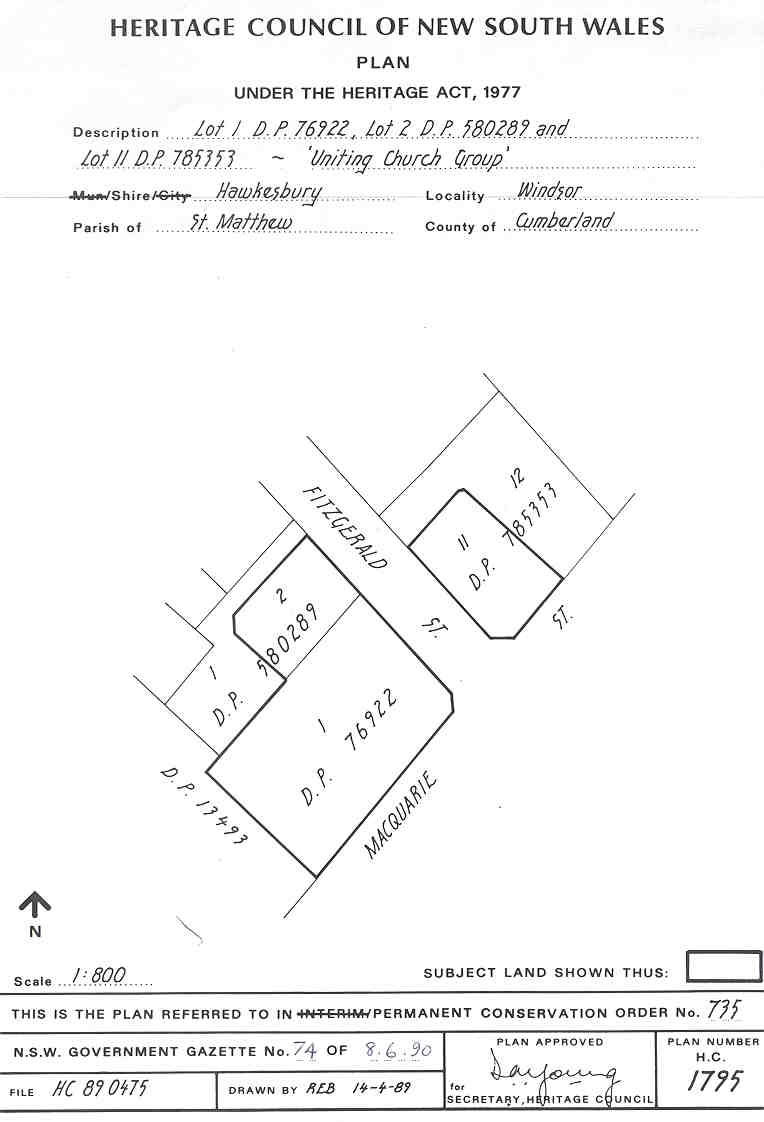
- Heritage boundaries

- Location within Sydney Location within Australia
- 33°36′27″S 150°49′15″E
- Location: 49 Macquarie Street, Windsor, City of Hawkesbury, New South Wales, Australia

New South Wales Heritage Register
- Official name: Methodist Parsonage (former); Uniting Church Group
- Type: State heritage (built)
- Designated: 2 April 1999
- Reference no.: 735
- Type: Presbytery/Rectory/ Vicarage/Manse
- Category: Religion

Windsor Methodist Parsonage is a heritage-listed clergy house at 49 Macquarie Street, Windsor, City of Hawkesbury, New South Wales, Australia. It is also known as Chantons Chambers. It was added to the New South Wales State Heritage Register on 2 April 1999.

== History ==
The former Methodist parsonage was built at the 1870s, in the same time period as the second (present) Methodist - now Uniting - church. The original parsonage had been destroyed along with the original church in the devastating fire of 23 December 1874. It ceased use as a parsonage in 1982.

== Description ==
The former parsonage is a two-storey, symmetrical three bay rendered brick house having steep gabled iron roof with a tall rendered chimney at each end. It features large windows paired on either side of a four-panelled front door with transome and side lights set within and arch. It has a two-storey verandah with cast iron balustrade and friezed columns paired on either side of the front door. French windows upstairs and typical timber picket fence.

== Heritage listing ==
Windsor Methodist Parsonage was listed on the New South Wales State Heritage Register on 2 April 1999.
