= Windsor, New South Wales =

Windsor
- Town
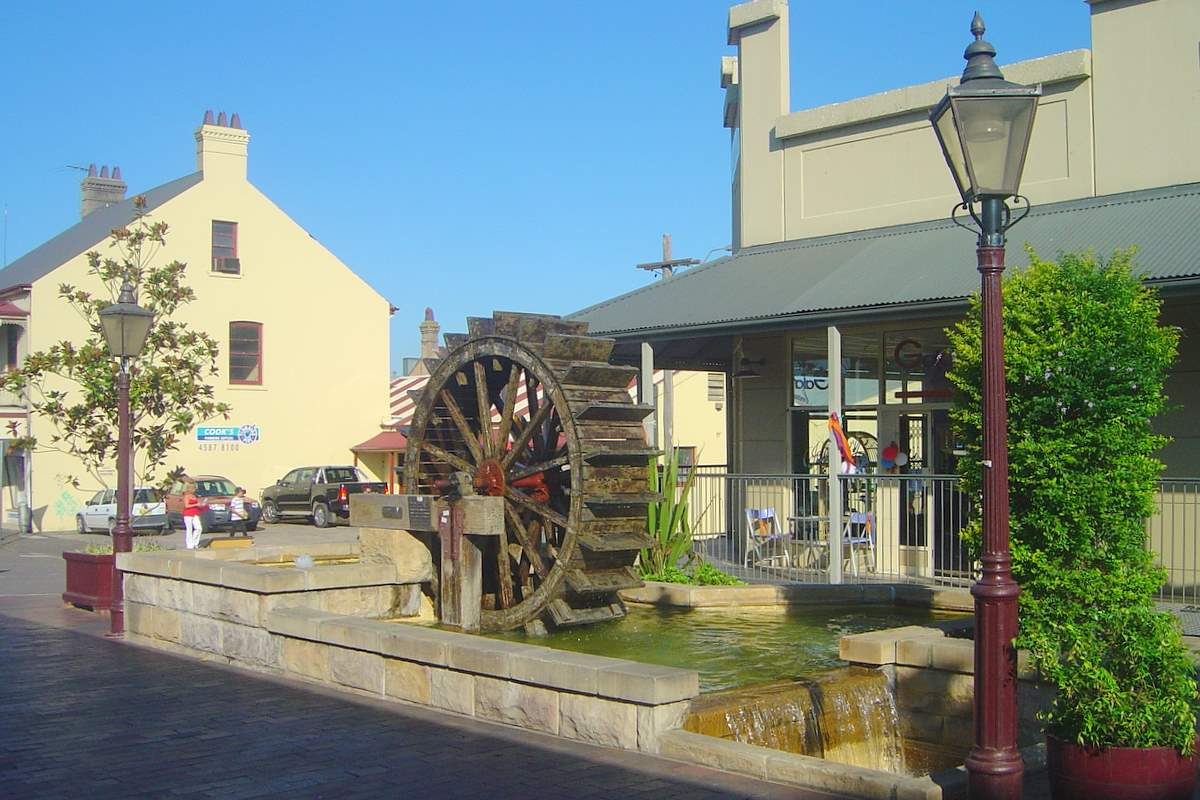
- The Windsor Mall (The Water Wheel)

- Interactive map of Windsor
- Country: Australia
- State: New South Wales
- City: Sydney
- LGA: City of Hawkesbury
- Location: 56 km (35 mi) north-west of Sydney CBD; 32.4 km (20.1 mi) north-west of Parramatta CBD; 5 km (3.1 mi) east of Richmond
- Established: 1791

Government
  - State electorate: Hawkesbury
  - Federal division: Macquarie
- Elevation: 21 m (69 ft)

Population
  - Total: 1,915 (Greater Windsor is 17,000) (2021 census)
- Postcode: 2756
Localities around Windsor
Cornwallis	Cornwallis and Freemans Reach	Pitt Town and Wilberforce
Clarendon	Windsor	Pitt Town Bottoms
South Windsor	Mulgrave	McGraths Hill

Windsor is a historic town in north-western Sydney in New South Wales, Australia. It is the council seat of the Hawkesbury local government area. The town sits on the Hawkesbury River, enveloped by farmland and Australian bush. Many of the oldest surviving European buildings in Australia are located at Windsor. It is 56 km (35 mi) north-west of the Sydney CBD, on the fringes of the city's urban sprawl.

== Demographics ==
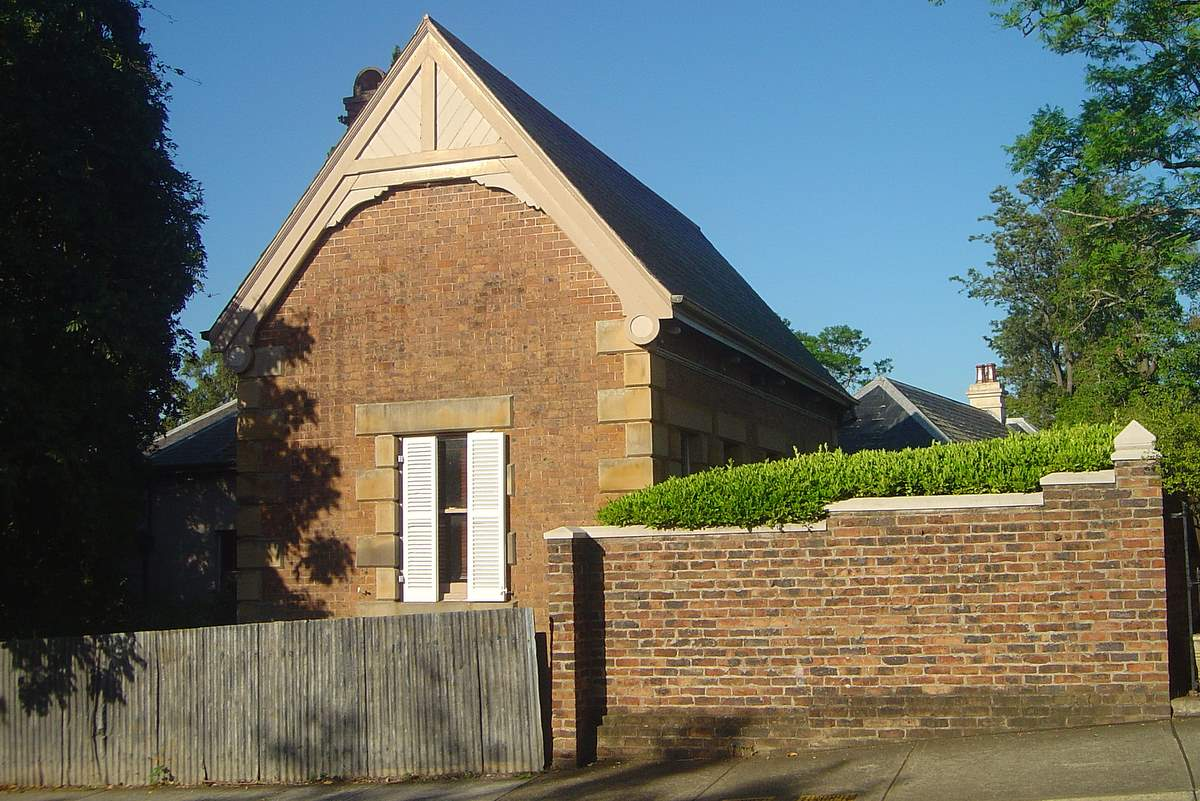
The Sanctum at Sunny Brae

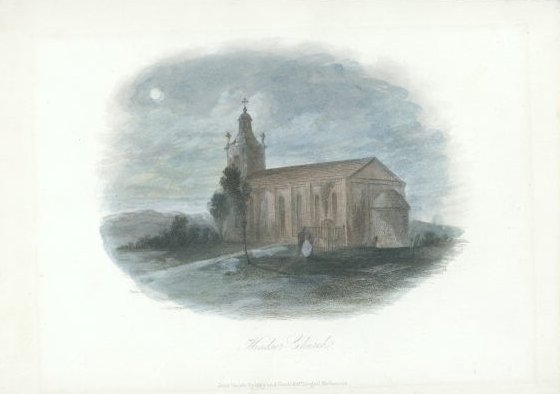
St Matthew's church

At the 2021 census, Windsor had a reported population of 1,915 people, with a median age of 41. The most common ancestries in Windsor were English (38.4%), Australian (37.7%), Irish (12.7%), Scottish (10.7%), and Australian Aboriginal (6.3%). Most people from Windsor were born in Australia (77.2%), followed by England (2.9%) and India (2.2%).

The most common religious group in Windsor was Christianity (55.5%), including 19.1% Catholic and 19.1% Anglican. The second largest group was no religion (34.7%).

The most common occupations in Windsor included Professionals (17.4%), Technicians and Trades Workers (15.9%), Clerical and Administrative Workers (13.4%), Managers (12.9%), and Labourers (10.6%). The median weekly household income was A$1,679.

== Geography ==
The Greater Windsor area includes South Windsor, Bligh Park, Windsor Downs, McGraths Hill and Mulgrave suburbs.

Windsor's proximity to the Hawkesbury River has resulted in numerous disastrous floods. A horseshoe on the outside wall of the Macquarie Arms pub marks the level the flood peaked at in 1867. During the 1867 flood, beaches along the Hawkesbury River to Barrenjoey were littered with the debris from the town.

== History ==
The Windsor area was originally inhabited by the Dharuk (also Darug) nation of indigenous aboriginal peoples.

Windsor is the fourth oldest place of British settlement on the Australian continent. Settlement at the location was first established circa 1791, near the head of navigation on the Hawkesbury River (known as Deerubbin in Dharuk). European settlers utilised the fertile river flats for agriculture. The area was originally called Green Hills, but renamed Windsor (after Windsor in England). The town was officially proclaimed in a Government and General Order issued from Government House, Sydney, dated 15 December 1810. Governor Lachlan Macquarie "marked out the district of Green Hills", which he "... called Windsor", after Windsor-on-the-Thames.

While in Windsor, Governor Macquarie ordered the main institutions of organised settlement to be erected, including a church, school-house, gaol and "commodious inn" (Macquarie Arms Hotel). Of these new buildings, the most outstanding was Francis Greenway's St Matthew's Anglican Church. Governor Macquarie himself chose the site for the church. Samuel Marsden, principal chaplain of the colony, consecrated the church on 8 December 1822.

Windsor was chosen during settlement because of its agricultural potential and accessible location. In 1813 a report was given to Governor Macquarie from Earl Bathurst detailing a proposed invasion of the Hawkesbury River by France. This planned invasion that did not eventuate targeted the Windsor granary in order to cut off supply to Sydney, demonstrating the relative importance of this new settlement on a global scale. Windsor is 56 km (35 mi) north-west of Sydney, and easily accessible by coastal shipping from Sydney along the Hawkesbury River. It was known as the "bread basket", ensuring the survival of the starving colony. The extensive agriculture caused major silting in the Hawkesbury River; by the 1890s the Hawkesbury River had become so blocked with silt, ships could not travel up to Windsor from the coast. By then, a railway (in 1864) and road (in 1814) had been built to compensate.

On 1 January 1803, Daniel Egan was born in Windsor. He went on to become Mayor of Sydney in 1853.

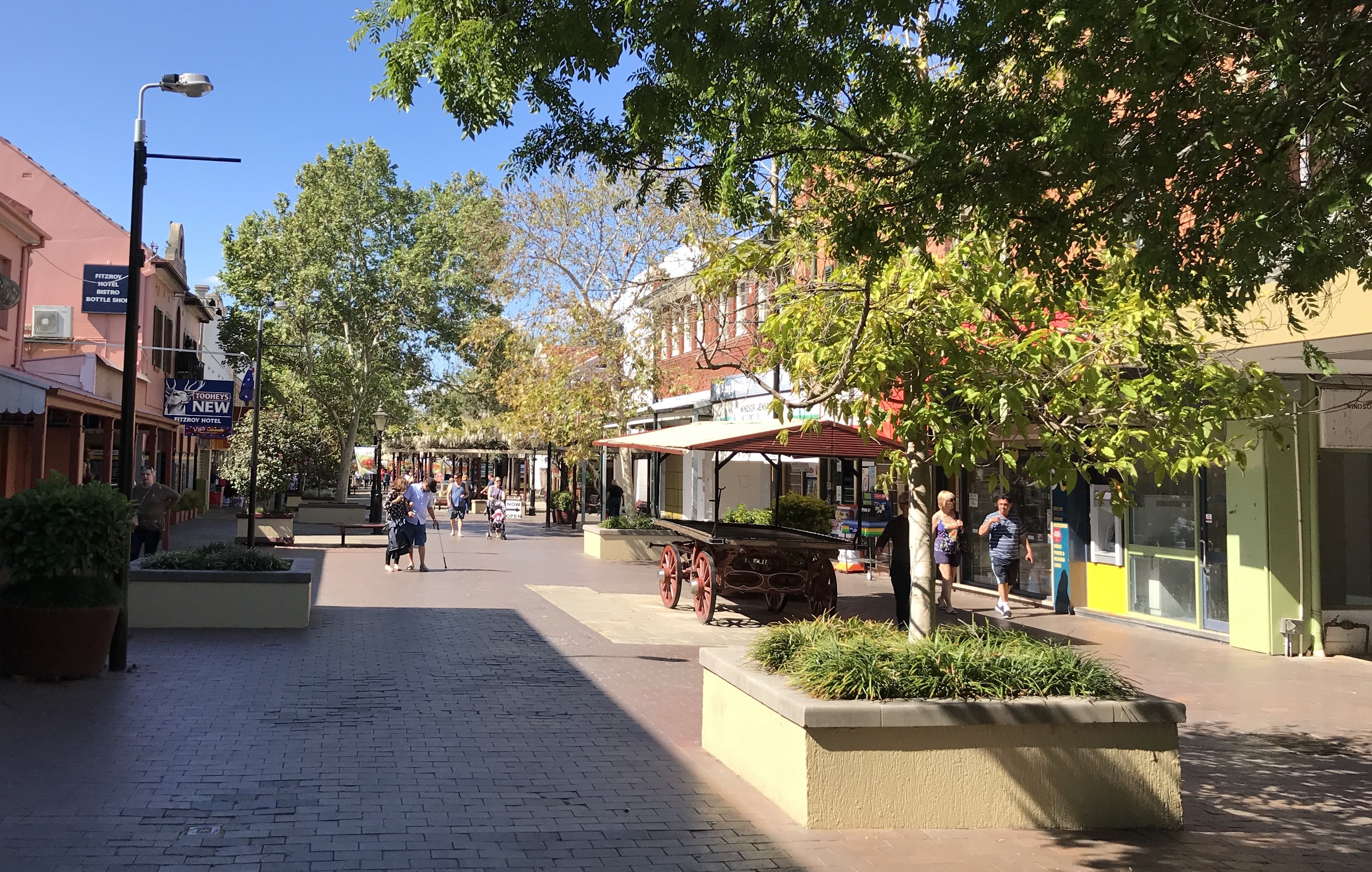
George Street Windsor

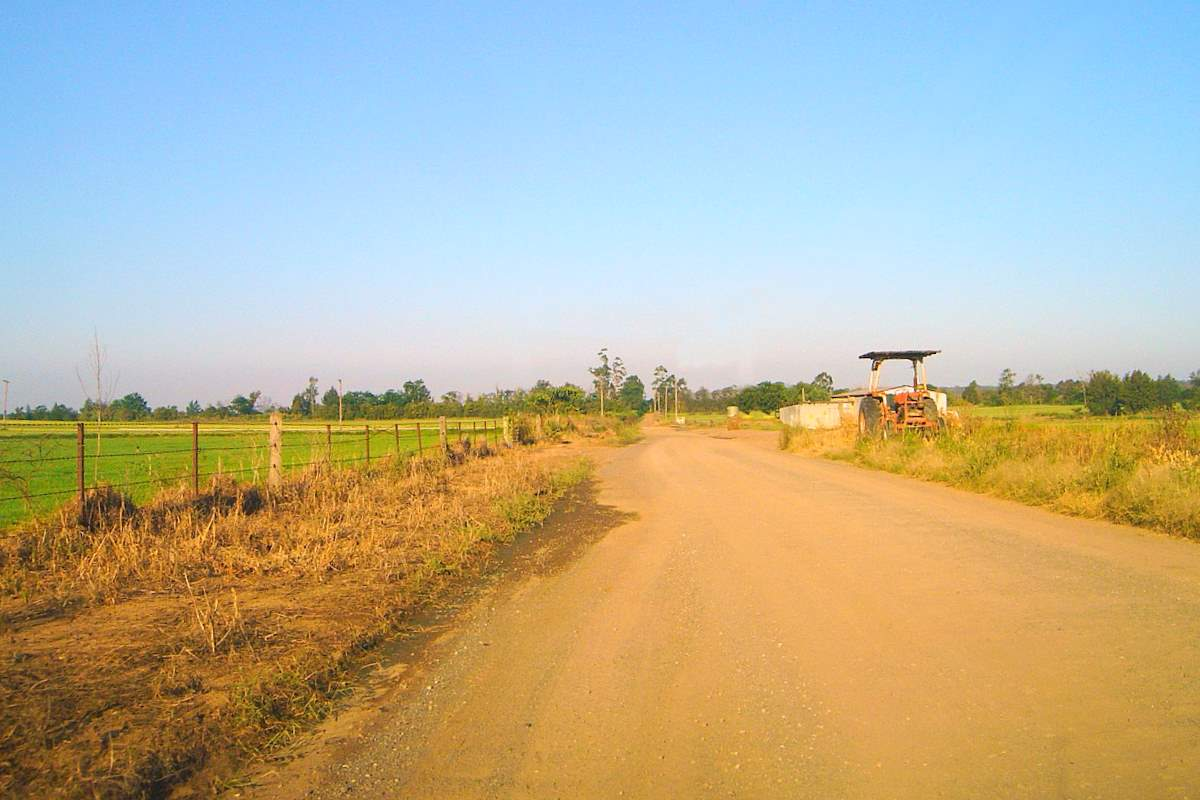
An agricultural area in Windsor

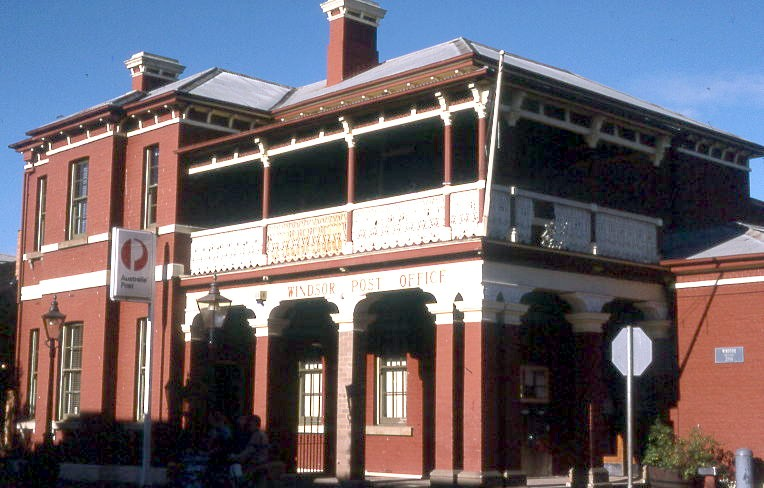
Windsor Post Office

== Attractions and Heritage listings ==
Major attractions of Windsor are The Windsor Mall (Water Wheel), Windsor Mall Sunday Market, Hawkesbury Regional Museum, Howe Park, Windsor Beach, Macquarie Park, Governor Philip Park, Hawkesbury Regional Gallery, St Matthew's Anglican Church, Windsor Bridge and Hawkesbury Paddlewheeler.

Windsor has a number of heritage-listed sites, including:

- Blacktown–Richmond railway: Windsor railway station
- 32–34 Bridge Street: Windsor Police Station Stables
- Claremont Crescent: Claremont Cottage
- Court and Pitt Streets: Windsor Court House
- 29 Fitzgerald Street: Mackenzie House
- 41 George Street: Government Cottage Archaeological Site
- 126 George Street: Loder House
- 226 George Street: Simmons Hardware Store
- 350 George Street: Reverend Turner Cottage
- 361 George Street: McQuade Park
- 23–27 Johnston Street: Johnston Street terraces
- Macquarie Street: Windsor Uniting Church and Hall
- 49 Macquarie Street: Windsor Methodist Parsonage
- Moses Street: St Matthew's Anglican Church
- 25, 28, 29, 31–33, 35 North Street: North Street residences
- 37–39 North Street: Court House Hotel
- Palmer Street: Peninsula House and Tebbutt's Observatory
- Thompson Square: Macquarie Arms Hotel
- Thompson Square: Thompson Square Conservation Area
- 5 Thompson Square: 5 Thompson Square

== Media ==
The studios of local community radio station, Hawkesbury Radio, are located in Windsor.

Pitt Town, which is 9.3 km (5.8 mi) north west of Windsor, was a filming location for the Channel 7 television series A Country Practice. It was the set of the fictional town of Wandin Valley. The opening credits featured the former Court House Hotel, Windsor at 37–39 North Street as the doctor's clinic. Windsor High School at Mulgrave was also used as the fictional Burrigan High School in the series

== Transport ==
Urban sprawl of metropolitan Sydney has almost reached Windsor. The town is now regarded as an outer suburb which has retained its appeal as a small country town. Growth in the Hawkesbury area has created an increased need for public transport and roads. Most people from Windsor traveled to work by car in 2016 (68.9%). Only 9.0% of people used public transport.

Windsor railway station opened 1 December 1864. It is on the Richmond branch.

Located in the town centre is the Windsor Bridge which was constructed in 1874. It is the oldest existing crossing of the Hawkesbury River. There was a proposal in 2013 by the Government of New South Wales to demolish the existing bridge and replace it with a safer bridge. It was suggested by the political activist group Community Action for Windsor Bridge (CAWB) that a bypass is a better option to preserve history, ensure safety, and better manage the congestion of Windsor Road. Nevertheless, the new bridge was constructed despite the protests. On 18 May 2020 the replacement bridge was opened to traffic within Windsor, NSW.

The new bridge has a centreline height of 17.8 metres Australian Height Datum (AHD) (i.e. significantly higher than the typical water level – peak flood levels at Windsor bridge are 11.1 metres AHD and 17.2 metres AHD for the five year and 100 year ARI events respectively.). In 2021 the bridge was closed due to flooding in March 2021, and further work on the new bridge was completed

Windsor is also connected to Parramatta via the 31-kilometre-long (19 mi) Windsor Road cycleway, with much of its route via the North-West T-way.

== Commercial area ==
The Windsor Mall Sunday Market are held weekly on Sunday between 9.00am to 3.00pm. The markets contain stalls selling jewellery, books, arts and crafts, paintings, fashion items, fresh locally grown produce, locally produced jams and many food and drink stands.

== Gallery ==
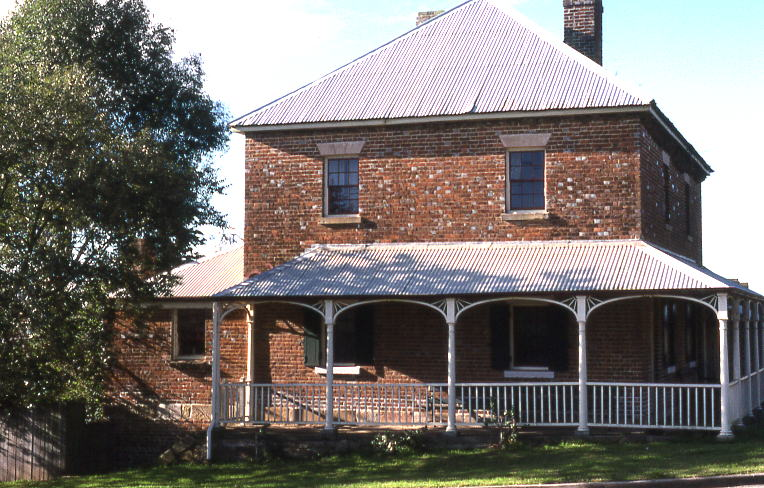
Historic Home in Windsor

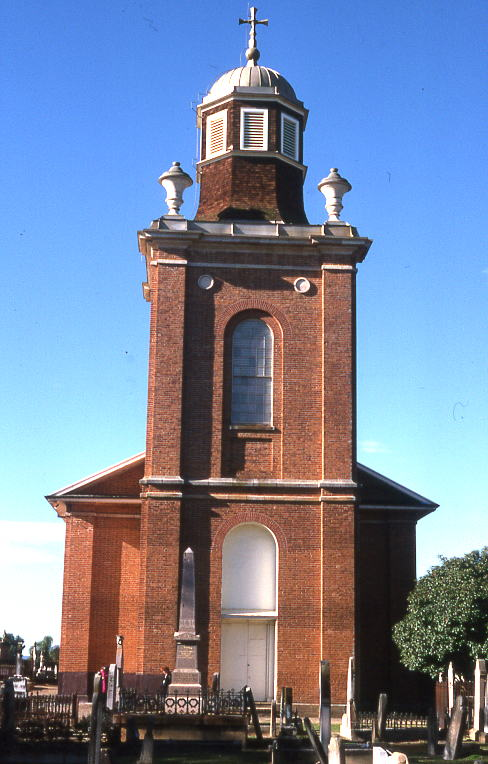
St Matthew's Anglican Church, designed by Francis Greenway

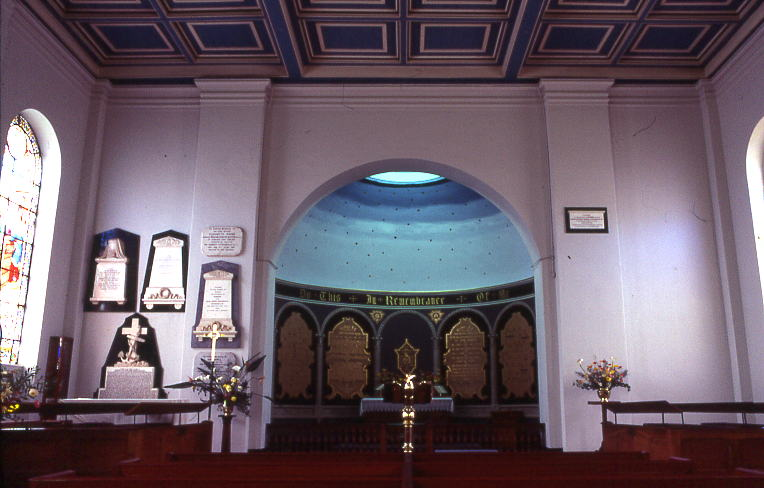
Interior of St Matthew's Church

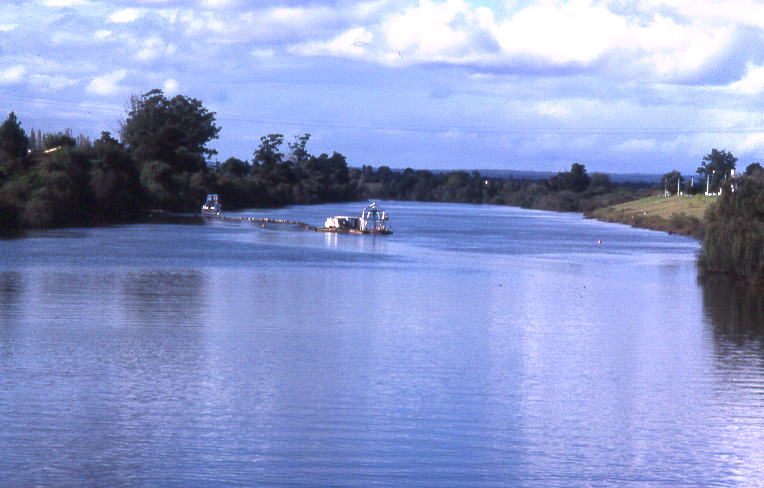
Hawkesbury River at Windsor

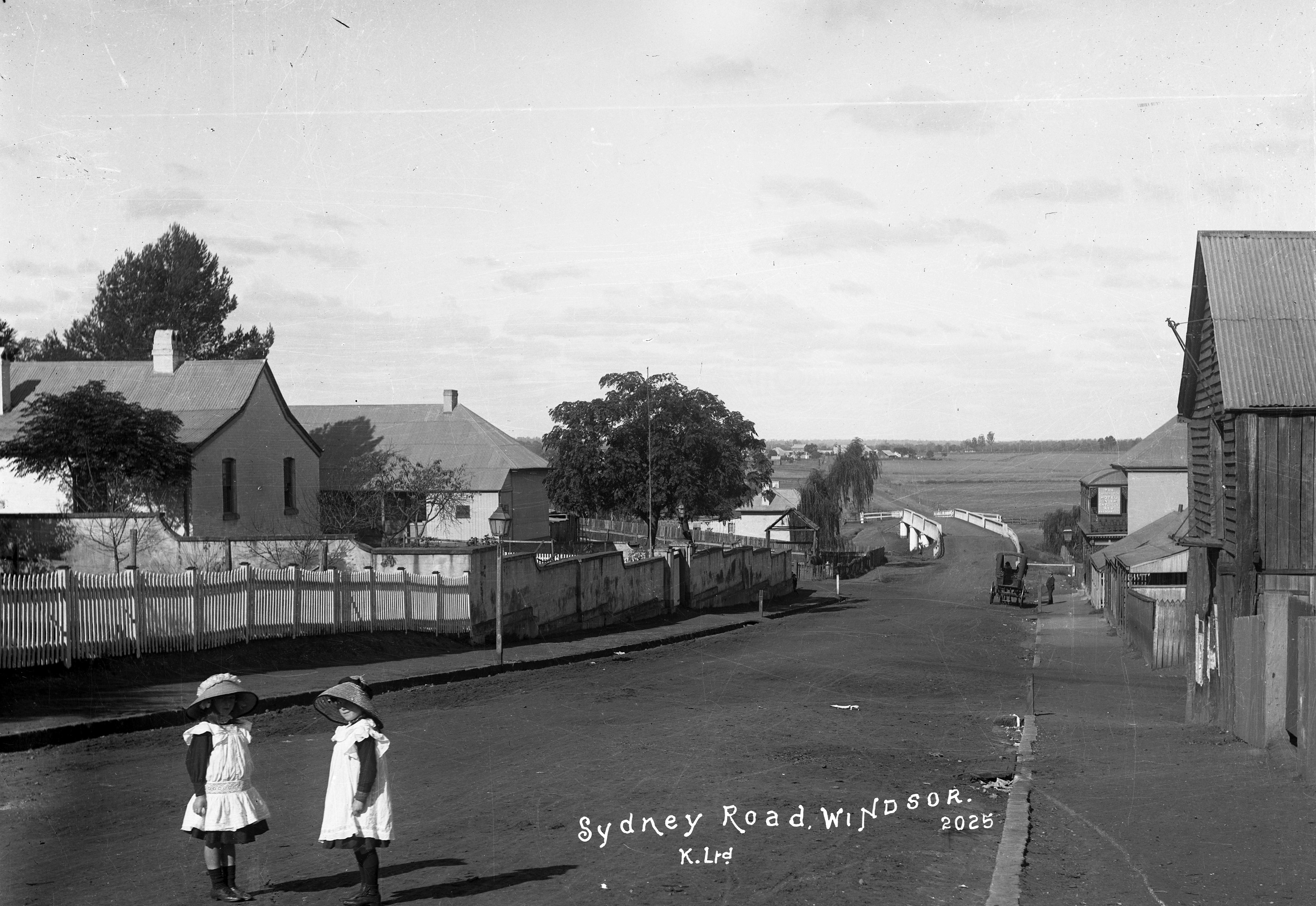
Poster Contest (Royal Australian Historical Society)

== Bibliography ==
- Bowd, D. G. Macquarie Country: A History of the Hawkesbury. Library of Australian History, 1994.
- CAWB. 'Windsor Bridge.' http://www.cawb.com.au/the-place.html
- Fitzpatrick, J.C.L. When We Were Boys Together: reminiscences of the Hawkesbury district. C. McHardy, c. 2004.
- Jack, Ian, and Jan Barkley-Jack. St Matthews Windsor - An Anglican Landmark celebrating 200 years. Rosenberg Publishing, 2016.
- Proudfoot, Helen. The Hawkesbury: A Thematic History. Hawkesbury City Council, 2017. https://www.hawkesbury.nsw.gov.au/__data/assets/pdf_file/0004/119911/The-Hawkesbury-A-Thematic-History-2017-February.pdf
- Smith, Heather. Leaving The Barracks – Windsor Police Station, 1862–2010. H. Smith, 2011.
- Steele, James. Early Days of Windsor. https://gutenberg.net.au/ebooks13/1302241h.html

== See also ==
- Dillwynia Women's Correctional Centre
- John Morony Correctional Centre
- Windsor Wolves
- Richmond, New South Wales
