= Thompson Square Conservation Area =

Conservation area in Thompson Square, Australia

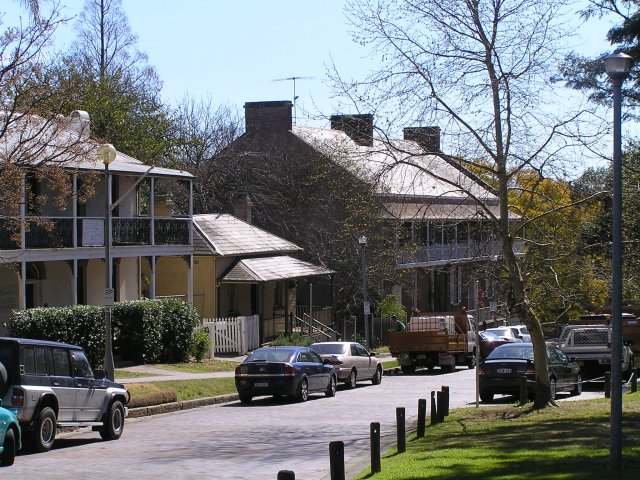

- Location within New South Wales Location within Australia
- 33.6046°S 150.8232°E
- Location: Thompson Square, Windsor, City of Hawkesbury, New South Wales, Australia

History
- Built: 1811–

Site notes
- Architect: Governor Macquarie
- Owner: Alkyen Pty Ltd; Hawkesbury City Council

New South Wales Heritage Register
- Official name: Thompson Square Conservation Area; Thompson Square Precinct; New Windsor Bridge Project
- Type: state heritage (conservation area)
- Designated: 2 April 1999
- Reference no.: 126
- Type: Townscape
- Category: Urban Area

Thompson Square Conservation Area is a heritage-listed precinct centred around Thompson Square in Windsor, City of Hawkesbury, New South Wales, Australia. It was added to the New South Wales State Heritage Register on 2 April 1999.

== History ==
Thompson Square preserves the early colonial character of Windsor. The centre of Thompson Square is spoilt by a main road which slices diagonally through it and into a cutting, destroying the visual integrity of the space as was originally intended.

The conservation area includes the following historic buildings:

The Doctor's House – 1–3 Thompson Square

In 1819 James Doyle leased a dwelling and tenement known as the Freemason's Arms on the site of the Doctor's House from Charles Beasley. The 1828 census states Doyle as an innkeeper at Windsor. In 1830 Doyle was licensed to sell wine at the house known as the "Lord Nelson" at Windsor Terrace. In 1831 Joseph Delandre is listed as the licensee of the "Lord Nelson". In 1837 Edward Coffey issued a notice stating that the 'Daniel O'Conner Hotel' at Windsor had opened for the reception of visitors. It adjoined the Kings Wharf, the premises formerly occupied by James Doyle. It has not been established that this was in fact the present Doctors House, though the building is certainly colonial in style.

House & outbuildings – 5 Thompson Square

Hawkesbury Museum – 7 Thompson Square

The land on which this building stands was part of grant of 12 ha to William Baker in 1800. The site was then given as a town allotment to John Howe in 1811. The building is claimed to have been built about 1843.

Macquarie Arms Hotel – cnr Thompson and George Streets

During Macquarie's tour of the district in 1811 he gave a large allotment in the square to Richard Fitzgerald on the express condition that he immediately build a handsome commodious inn of brick or stone and to be of at least two stories high. It was built in 1815 and named in honour of Governor Macquarie.

Cottage – 62 George Street

Built 1830–1840.

Shop – 66, 68 George Street

Shop (formerly Hawkesbury Garage) – 70, 72 George Street

Probably from the 1920s.

Shop (A. C Stearn Building) – 74 George Street

Photographic evidence indicated that it was originally a single storey building with parapet and with a convex profile corrugated iron street awning. The existing urns and lion were originally on the single storey building. The second storey parapet is dated 1907.

Sites – 4 Bridge Street & 60 George Street

House & outbuildings – 6 Bridge Street

Built c. 1830.

House & outbuildings – 10 Bridge Street

Built c. 1850.

House – 17 Bridge Street

Former School of Arts – cnr Bridge Street and George Street

Built 1861.

== Description ==
Thompson Square consists of George Street, Bridge Street, Thompson Square and The Terrace. These streets surround a small turfed reserve with pleasant trees that helps to conserve an attractive frontage to the important surrounding buildings.

One large old hoop pine tree (Araucaria cunninghamii) over the cutting for the Putty Road is reputed to be all that remains of the mid-late 19th century plantings around the square. Once there were Norfolk Island pines (Araucaria heterophylla) on the square's western side outside the Macquarie Arms Hotel and in front of the Fitzgerald wall. These were removed, as well as native fig tree species, after protests concerning acts of public indecency by people leaving the nearby hotel relieving themselves under the trees. Also growing around the square are several silky oak trees (Grevillea robusta) and one kurrajong (Brachychiton populneus).

Thompson Square is surrounded by a number of Colonial Georgian buildings including;

The Doctor's House – 1–3 Thompson Square

A fine, substantial two storey sandstone brick terrace building. It has a good joinery attic storey, fine front door flanked by engaged columns and a very well designed fanlight.

House & outbuildings – 5 Thompson Square

A brick Georgian single storey cottage of three bays with a corrugated iron roof and three bay timber verandah.

Hawkesbury Museum – 7 Thompson Square

A brick Georgian two storeyed house with corrugated iron roof, five bays wide with a five bay verandah. The balcony is a Victorian addition and has a fine cast iron balustrade.

Macquarie Arms Hotel – cnr Thompson and George Streets

A two storeyed stuccoed brick inn with attic storey and cellars and corrugated iron roof. The Colonial character has been impaired with the addition of box like protuberances to the corners of the building.

Vacant site – 60 George Street

Cottage – 62 George Street

A single storey Georgian cottage. A Victorian cast iron columns, balustrading and valance.

Shops – 64, 66, 68 George Street

A two-storey stuccoed brick house and shop formerly occupied by Georgian single storey terraces.

70, 72 George Street

Formerly Hawkesbury Garage, now a shop.

74 George Street (A.C Stearn Building)

Stuccoed two storey building with a parapet to the street front.

82 George Street

One storey house turned into a shop.

Vacant site – 4 Bridge Street

House & outbuildings – 6 Bridge Street

A brick Georgian cottage of five bays with a three bay timber verandah and balancing brick chimneys and corrugated iron roof.

House & outbuildings – 10 Bridge Street

A two-storey brick Regency style building with a particularly fine cast iron verandah, balcony and stuccoed parapet.

House – 17 Bridge Street

A brick Georgian single storey cottage with corrugated iron roof, of five bays.

Former School of Arts – cnr Bridge Street and George Street

A single storey brick stuccoed Italianate hall with the later additions of side wings and a loggia.

Pioneer Families Bicentennial Memorial

Featuring an anchor, symbolising the importance of the river in the history of the town and the nation, with a plaque recording the names of many of the early families.

== Heritage listing ==
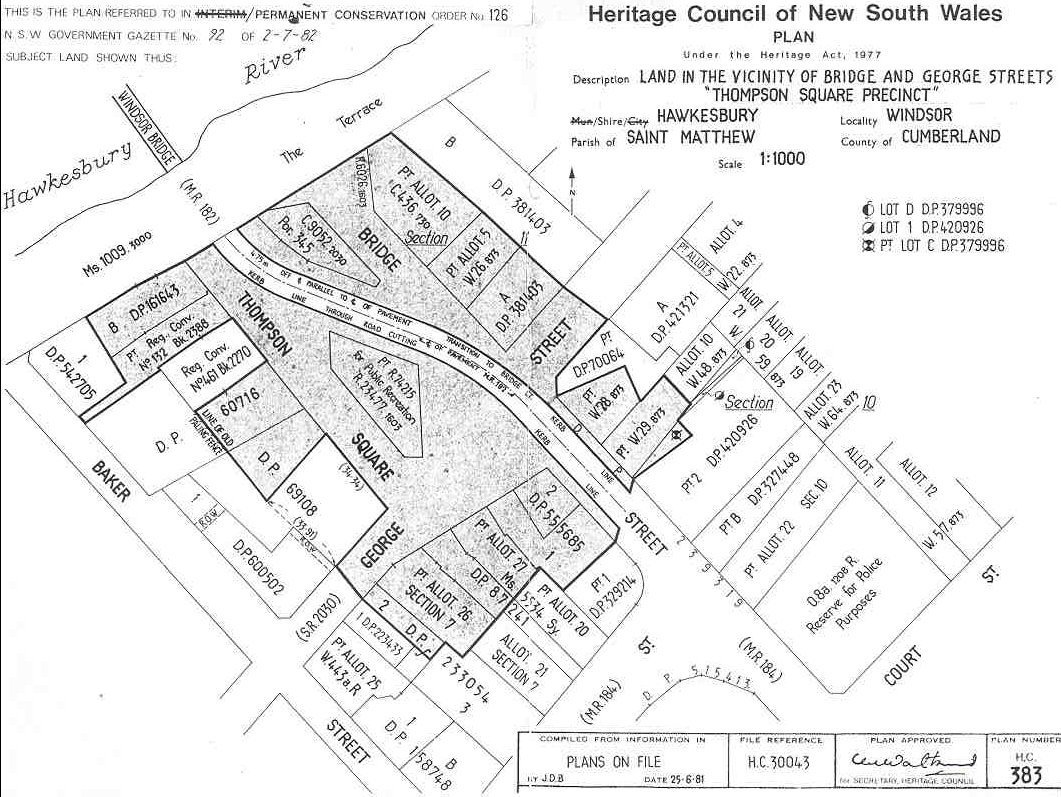
Heritage map

Thompson Square is one of the oldest public squares in Australia and notable for the large number of Colonial Georgian buildings which surround it. It is the only public space remaining from the original town and has played an important part in the history of the town. It is the only remaining civic space as laid out by Governor Macquarie and is a vital precinct in the preservation of the early Colonial character of Windsor. The Square reflects Macquarie's visionary schemes for town planning excellence in the infant colony.

Thompson Square Conservation Area was listed on the New South Wales State Heritage Register on 2 April 1999 having satisfied the following criteria.

The place is important in demonstrating the course, or pattern, of cultural or natural history in New South Wales.

Thompson Square is one of the oldest public squares in Australia and notable for the large number of Colonial Georgian buildings which surround it. It is the only public space remaining from the original town and has played an important part in the history of the town. It is the only remaining civic space as laid out by Governor Macquarie and is vital precinct in the preservation of the early Colonial character of Windsor. The Square reflects Macquarie's visionary schemes for town planning excellence in the infant colony.

The place is important in demonstrating aesthetic characteristics and/or a high degree of creative or technical achievement in New South Wales.

Thompson Square is surrounded by a large number of Colonial Georgian buildings and sites that preserve the character of the square.

The place possesses uncommon, rare or endangered aspects of the cultural or natural history of New South Wales.

Thompson Square is one of the oldest public squares in Australia.
