= Macquarie Towns =

Macquarie Towns or the Five Macquarie Towns is the collective term for the towns of Castlereagh, Pitt Town, Richmond, Wilberforce and Windsor, all located on and around the Hawkesbury River in New South Wales, Australia.

All five towns were established in December 1810 by Governor of New South Wales Lachlan Macquarie. Governor Macquarie established the towns on higher ground following serious flooding of the Hawkesbury River the previous year. This was important as the area provided the fledgling colony of New South Wales with half its annual grain requirements.
