= Hadley Park =

Heritage-listed park

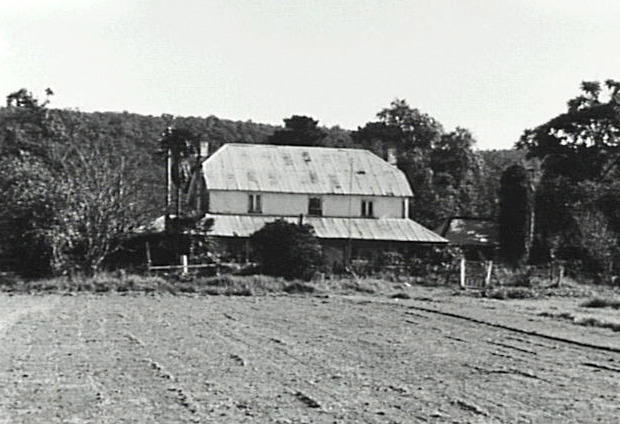
- Hadley Park, c. 1810

- Location within New South Wales Location within Australia
- 33°41′16″S 150°39′50″E
- Location: 14-278 Old Castlereagh Road, Castlereagh, City of Penrith, New South Wales, Australia

History
- Built: 1803–1812

Site notes
- Owner: Penrith Lakes Development Corporation

New South Wales Heritage Register
- Official name: Hadley Park
- Type: State heritage (complex / group)
- Designated: 20 April 2018
- Reference no.: 2009
- Type: Historic Landscape
- Category: Landscape - Cultural

Hadley Park is a heritage-listed site in Castlereagh, a suburb of Sydney, Australia. It is culturally significant for local Aboriginal people, and for its use by early European settlers as a farm, dairy and later as a gravel quarry. The park, located at 14-278 Old Castlereagh Road, was built from 1803 to 1812. It was added to the New South Wales State Heritage Register on 20 April 2018.

== History ==
=== Pre-contact history ===
The area surrounding Hadley Park has a long history of occupation by the Mulgowie (Mulgoa) and Boorooberongal Aboriginal people. Excavation of rock shelters on the western side of the Nepean River has revealed evidence of Aboriginal activity extending back approximately 20,000 years. Artefacts identified in the immediate vicinity of Hadley Park suggests that Aboriginal people camped on the high ground next to Cranebrook Creek. While initial contact between European settlers and the local Aboriginal population was reported to be friendly, from about 1800 conflict between the groups along the Nepean, Hawkesbury and surrounding districts had escalated, leading to Governor Macquarie establishing a military detachment on the Nepean at Penrith in 1816. By this time, the Aboriginal population in the local region had significantly diminished due to disease, dislocation and open conflict, however Aboriginal people are recorded to still have been fishing and camping in the area in the 1850s. Hadley Park is part of a broader area that continues to be identified as a significant landscape by Darug groups and the Deerubbin Local Aboriginal Land Council today.

=== European colonisation ===
European settlement along the Hawkesbury River at Windsor and Richmond was established by the mid-1790s. In June 1789, an exploration party led by Governor Phillip and Captain Watkin Tench reached the banks of the Nepean River near to the future sites of Penrith and Castlereagh, where they observed there to be good soil for planting crops and grazing, and exchanged food and gifts with the local Aboriginal people. The isolation of the Nepean region, however, precluded the establishment of permanent settlement around Castlereagh until the early nineteenth century and it was not until 1803 that any land claims in the area were officially recognised. Governor King made out 31 land grants, mostly to former soldiers, with some land also being granted to free settlers and emancipists. Most of the Castlereagh land grants had river frontage and, unlike the earlier grants in Richmond and Windsor in the north, were set out in an orderly fashion, with straight north and south boundaries and eastern boundaries aligned to (Old) Castlereagh Road, which had been established in 1803 to join the new farming district with Windsor. The grants were also larger than those in the north, ranging between 28 and 65 hectares (70 and 160 acres), with the size of the allotments reflecting social status and family size. For instance, married non-commissioned officers were entitled to grants of up to 61 hectares (150 acres) plus 4 hectares (10 acres) per child and a single private was entitled to up to 36 hectares (90 acres). The ex-soldiers were also entitled to seeds and equipment from the government stores, food and clothing for up to a year and the services of convicts if they could support and feed them. Land grants were given on the proviso that areas would be cleared, put under cultivation and not transferred for five years. The Castlereagh area (also known as 'Mulgrave Place' and the 'District of Evan') soon became one of the colony's major agricultural regions and by 1804, enough trees had been cleared from the banks of the Nepean River to cause Governor King to intervene and forbid any further clearances.

The land on which Hadley Park is located was granted to Martin Mentz (also spelt as 'Mintz' or 'Mince') in 1803. Mentz arrived in the colony in 1791 as a free settler and enlisted in the NSW Corps as a private. He was discharged from the Corps in March 1803 and was one of the 24 ex-soldiers who were granted land in the Castlereagh area by Governor King. Mentz's grant, received on 30 June, was for a total of 32 hectares (80 acres) with river frontage. Mentz proceeded to clear and cultivate his land in accordance with the terms of the grant. By 1805 he had cleared over 8 hectares (20 acres) and planted wheat, maize and barley, and used another 12 hectares (29 acres) for grazing. With his wife, child and two servants, Mentz seems to have had some early success on the property, purchasing a range of agricultural and household goods from the government stores at Parramatta and Toongabbie. In August 1806, he leased 12 hectares (30 acres) to a Charles Hadley for A£45 and continued to live on a portion of his property. Mentz was granted a licence to sell alcohol in Sydney in 1810, and moved into town with his family, selling his remaining Nepean land holdings. In September of that year he transferred 20 hectares (50 acres) to Anne Landers for A£150. The Old Register entry for Landers dated 6 September 1810 mentions the transfer of "50 acres of land at the Nepean and a dwelling house", with the addition of "all buildings and appurtences" in the final transfer of property made in August 1811. This record points to the existence of a collection of buildings, including a dwelling house, on the property by at least 1810.

==== Charles Hadley ====
Charles Hadley first arrived in NSW as a convict aboard the Matilda, one of the ships of the Third Fleet, which reached Sydney in 1791. Hadley gained an absolute pardon and went back to England, but returned to NSW several years later, arriving in Sydney in March 1806. By August of this year he was living at Castlereagh, on the land leased from Martin Mentz. In 1812, Hadley married Sarah Phillips, with who he already had a son. (Note: Charles Hadley Jr, born 1810.) By 1825, Charles and Sarah had gone on to have seven more children. Hadley was also growing his farm during this period, and his house at Hadley Park soon became a local landmark in the district. He kept cattle on his property and supplied meat to the Emu Plains government stores from 1815. Hadley also acquired a publican's license to sell liquor in as early as April 1817, and his inn, known as the "First and Last", was the only one operating in Castlereagh at this time. The exact location of this inn within his land holdings is unknown.

By 1821, Hadley was listed as holding a total of 121 hectares (300 acres) at Castlereagh in the District of Evan. His reputation in the district continued to grow and he took on several civic responsibilities, including serving as a juror in 1819 and benefactor to the Windsor Bible Association in 1822. On 20 August 1822, five armed men broken into Charles Hadley's house and attacked him and his family, but made away with only a watch. Nepean Park was also built in 1822 on the adjoining allotment directly south of Hadley Park.

In early 1827, his wife Sarah left him for a neighbour, John Griffiths. Charles Hadley died in September the following year. In his will, he left Hadley Park to his oldest son, Charles Hadley Jr, who maintained the estate until his death in 1891.

==== Other Hadley family ownership ====
Hadley Park experienced several significant flood events during the mid-nineteenth century, the worst occurring in 1867 and reportedly washing away all of Hadley Jr's furniture and goods. An 1885 survey of landholders in the Castlereagh area noted that Charles Hadley Jr at Hadley Park had 32 hectares (80 acres) with nine horses, five cattle and four pigs and more livestock on a nearby holding. A later return in 1900 states that the property was under cultivation with maize and barley, further indicating a shift away from cattle.

With the death of Charles Hadley Jr in November 1891 and his wife Hannah only six days later, both from influenza, the northern lot with Hadley Park house passed to William Alvan Hadley Childs - the husband of their oldest daughter, Louisa Matilda Hadley. In April 1892, the 80 acre Hadley Park estate was assessed as having a value of A£800, with the most part being under cultivation. The property contained a brick house of seven rooms, a barn, stable and outbuildings, though they were in a dilapidated condition.

William Charles Hadley Childs, the son of Louisa Matilda Hadley and William Alvan Childs, was listed as the owner of the property in 1898. In August 1905, he repurchased all the blocks of land that had been separated from Hadley Park in the will of Charles Hadley Jr, reuniting the farm estate to its original 32 hectares (80 acres). William ran the property as a dairy farm, building a dairy building on the property sometime during the 1930s. Dairying became a popular industry in the Castlereagh district by the mid-twentieth century, with a 1941 survey showing all the land between the (Old) Castlereagh Road and the Nepean River being used for dairying purposes.

William died in July 1950 and his son, William George Childs, inherited the southern portion of the property, while his two daughters Hannah and Esla inherited the northern portion, including the house. Records from this time note that the northern portion equalled 18 hectares (44.5 acres) and included a brick cottage with attic, weatherboard kitchen, iron garage, two sheds, feeders, dairy and bails, four pit silos, water supply, clearing and fencing. The southern portion was 20 hectares (50 acres) and contained pit silos, an orchard, water supply, clearing and fencing and an unfinished galvanised iron hay shed. Between 1940 and 1961 a few improvements were made to the property including the addition of a new hay shed to the south of the dairy buildings, and part of the southern portion was planted with orchards to the river front, however these were removed by 1978.

=== Use as a quarry ===
Esla and Hannah Childs continued to own Hadley Park until 1972 when the western portions of the property closest to the river were sold to Quarries Pty Ltd, thus ending over 150 years of ownership by the Hadley-Childs family. Quarrying, gravel, and sand extraction had started along the Nepean River at Castlereagh from as early as the 1880s. Mining activities significantly increased from the 1970s, and many properties around the river were bought by mine and gravel companies. In 1978, Quarries Pty Ltd transferred the Hadley Park property to a subsidiary, Blue Metal and Gravel Ltd, which later became Blue Metal Industries, which was later bought out by Boral Ltd. By 1979, the larger quarrying companies that were operating at Castlereagh had combined their interests and were operating as part of the Penrith Lakes Development Corporation (PLDC). PLDC has owned Hadley Park since 1998.

Quarrying of the Hadley Park lots commenced c. 2001, in the areas west of Cranebrook Creek and east of the house to (Old) Castlereagh Road. Jacqueline Flower, a descendant of the Hadley family, moved into Hadley Park in 1996 and lived on the property (in separate living quarters, not in the house) until 2008. The main house was propped in 2008-2009 and a series of physical surveys were undertaken to assess the fabric and condition of the buildings. The buildings at Hadley Park have since remained unoccupied.

=== Public ownership ===
In March 2019 Minister for Planning & Housing, Anthony Roberts announced the state government had taken ownership of the property. "The acquisition of Hadley Park means we can preserve and protect this State Heritage listed site and allow future generations to come and learn about an important part of Australian history" he said. 'Getting this property into public ownership has taken considerable efforts, and it's important we make sure the restoration work is done, and the needs of the community accounted for, before it is opened to the general public'. The Department of Planning and Environment will consult with the community to develop a management plan for the long-term future management of the property' he said. "The Department is investigating options with the NSW Department of Industry on a training program for young apprentices and students to participate in the restoration work needed...". The Planning Ministerial Corporation (PMC) will manage the property initially, while a full report on the condition of the site is produced, before restoration works commenced, based on a conservation management plan.

== Description ==
=== Setting and curtilage ===
Hadley Park comprises a farm house, a collection of farm buildings and a garden located in a part remnant colonial rural landscape, part man-made lakes scheme on the Nepean River floodplain. Visually, the floodplain is framed by the Cranebrook Escarpment to the east and the imposing Lapstone Monocline of the Blue Mountains National Park to the west. The monocline provides a dramatic backdrop to the property. The house, farm buildings and garden are located in the centre of the original 1803 lot, the easternmost portion of which has been quarried and inundated as part of the new Lake Burralow of the Penrith Lakes Scheme. The land west of the house slopes gently down to Cranebrook Creek, which has historically been an important feature of the property and its neighbour Nepean Park, which is located on the adjoining property directly south of Hadley Park. Land between Cranebrook Creek and Nepean River was quarried but has since been reconstructed into flat, grassed parkland, meaning that the property's connection to the river has been reinstated. The areas to the north and east of the property have been transformed into man-made lakes as part of the Penrith Lakes Scheme. The property's access way from Old Castlereagh Road has been partially removed with the quarrying of this road, and consequently the historical relationship between the two has been obscured.

The recommended curtilage largely corresponds to the original land grant for the property, which included frontage to the Nepean River. The eastern areas of the lots between the house and the former alignment of (Old) Castlereagh Road are not included in the curtilage as they have been quarried and inundated as part of one of the lakes of the Penrith Lakes Scheme. (Old) Castlereagh Road has been removed in this area, meaning that the historical and visual relationship between the property and the road has been lost.

=== Views ===
Connections between the property and related colonial properties are still evident in the landscape, despite years of quarrying and its subsequent transformation into the Penrith Lakes Scheme. Being located on a cleared floodplain, Hadley Park commands, and is evident in, long views in all directions. Views of and from the house are significant, including the view of the house and property with the Lapstone Monocline beyond (both on its own and as a group with Nepean Park), to and from the house to the Cranebrook Escarpment and Christ Church in Castlereagh to the east, and the view between the house and the mass concrete house, Smith Road, to the north. Hadley Park house was designed to be seen from Old Castlereagh Road.

=== Aboriginal cultural landscape ===
The land of Hadley Park is part of a broader Aboriginal cultural landscape that extends from the Blue Mountains to the Cranebrook Escarpment. The Penrith Lakes area was a traditional meeting place for Aboriginal people. Its river and rich soils provided abundant natural vegetation and wildlife which supported Aboriginal people for many generations. Evidence of this history has been revealed through the over 500,000 artefacts were collected during the 25 years of sand and gravel mining at Penrith Lakes. This area of the Nepean River was also one of the many first contact places where local Aboriginal people were able to stay on their traditional lands by camping and working for the colonial settlers. It was a place of confrontation between Aboriginal people and colonial settlers before peaceful relationships were established.

=== Landscape elements ===
The landscape is a remnant agricultural landscape with paddocks and fence lines and remnant kitchen garden and cultural plantings around the house. The land was substantially cleared by 1806. Significant landscape elements are:

- peppercorn trees (Schinus molle var. areira), to the west of the line of buildings from north to south. Some may date from the early nineteenth century, while some may be self-seeded descendants of early trees. Peppercorn trees are considered markers of early nineteenth century properties in western Sydney
- Chinese windmill palms (Trachycarpus fortunei) to the east and west of Hadley Park house, the earliest dating to the interwar period
- prominent conifers, jacaranda (J. mimosifolia) and white cedar (Melia azederach var.australasica)
- old lemon tree (Citrus limon) near the slab cottage and Hadley Park house
- fruit trees including: orange trees (Citrus sinensis) east of the former stables outbuilding, plum (Prunus X domestica) west of the guest bedroom, loquat (Eroibotrya japonica) west of the guest bedroom, pecan (Carya illinoinensis) northeast of the house on the boundary to the front paddock
- ancient eucalypts, including a cabbage gum (Eucalyptus amplifolia) south of the line of buildings
- brick and stone-edged garden beds near Hadley Park house
- brick paths near Hadley Park house
- native vegetation along Cranebrook Creek
- timber fencing

=== Buildings ===
Hadley Park house (built prior to 1810) was built on the elevated terrace along the eastern side of the Cranebrook Creek tributary. Hadley Park house was designed as a substantial residence, with its main elevation facing Old Castlereagh Road. The house is a freestanding symmetrical construction, rectangular in plan, part two-storey (front) and part single-storey (rear). The two-storey front section has a jerkin-head roof, a brick chimney at the northern end and a false brick chimney at the southern end (for symmetry). The house is timber post and beam construction with sandstock brick nogging between the timber uprights. The facades have an external painted brickwork face to weatherproof the building. The roof is framed in split rafters and clad in corrugated iron, and retains battens for the earlier cladding of timber shingles. A wrap-around verandah extends along the north, east and south elevations, with a concave curved corrugated iron roof supported on timber posts with concrete bases. Verandah floors are concrete. The western end of the northern verandah finishes in a timber slab wall, clad in metal sheets on the western side. Windows to the front section are timber-framed, double-hung with a short 3-paned lower sash and a larger 6-paned upper sash.

The front section of the house contains a central hall/stair with a room to either side and the first floor contains a stairwell/hall with a bedroom on each side. The ground floor hall floor is of compacted earth, with the remaining floor surfaces of this floor being concrete over sandstock brick paving. The internal walls are plastered and the ground floor front room has timber tongue and grooved internal doors. There are also some c. 1920s-30s timber doors. One simple fireplace with timber mantelpiece is located in the northern ground floor front room. The stair is modern. Most internal ceilings are Masonite. The first floor rooms do not have ceilings and the walls are unlined, with the brick nogging exposed. The single-storey rear section contains three rooms under a steeply pitched, corrugated iron skillion roof with a small verandah under a continuation of the skillion. The windows to the rear section have timber slab shutters. The ceilings in the rear section are very low.

Other developments include:

- Slab cottage (1806) (also called the weatherboard cottage): Single-storey timber slab cottage of two rooms, rectangular in plan, and with a hipped roof clad in corrugated iron in short sheets. The timber slab walls are protected with corrugated iron and flat metal sheets. The cottage has two doorways facing east, with the northern of these protected with a corrugated iron awning. Three timber-framed window openings (now covered over externally) face west and have timber slab shutters with side hinges. One door is timber, ledged and braced and clad in plywood, while the other s a timber four-panel door. The internal floor is a thin concrete layer over earlier brick paving, which is visible in places. There is no ceiling. The roof retains timber battens, evidence of the original roof cladding of timber shingles. There are remains of a brick external fireplace on the cottage's northern elevation.
- Bathroom and toilet outbuildings (c. 1950s-60s and c. 1930s respectively): The toilet outhouse, a small weatherboard building with a corrugated iron skillion roof, is located west of Hadley Park house and next to the bathroom outbuilding. The bathroom outbuilding is a single-storey, concrete block building with a shallow-pitched, corrugated iron gable roof which extends partly over the skillion to the rear wing verandah of the house. It has one timber-framed high window facing north and another facing east, along with a timber ledged and braced door. The gable ends to the north and south are clad in corrugated iron.
- Guest bedroom (c. 1930s): Single storey painted concrete block building, square in plan, with a corrugated iron clad hipped roof. Located to the west of Hadley Park house. The building has timber double-hung sash windows with a plywood door on the northern wall, and wide plywood eaves. There is a brick chimney on the building's southern side.
- Water tank (19th century): Elevated corrugated iron water tank on a sawn plank platform supported on sawn timber beams and four circular bush posts.
- Underground well and water pump (1806-1828): Underground circular brick well, covered over with timber slabs. Located west of the slab cottage. A timber-framed, skillion-roof shed, clad in corrugated iron sheets, has been built over the water pump and well, probably when the pump was converted to electrical power sometime in the twentieth century.
- Former wash house (1806-1828): Timber slab building of post and beam construction with a corrugated iron skillion roof, located west of the underground well and water pump. The building abuts a peppercorn tree.
- Chicken shed: Simple timber-framed mesh chicken shed located to the west of the bathroom and toilet outbuildings.
- Former stables outbuilding (1806-1828 with 1950s-60s extension): Rectangular building of post and beam construction with a gable roof clad in timber slab and corrugated iron. The building's long walls face north and south, with the northern wall mostly open. The building was extended to the east c. 1950s-60s. This extension is also of post and beam construction with a corrugated iron gable roof and corrugated iron clad walls.
- Former cream shed (c. 1900-1950): Small weatherboard shed with corrugated iron gable roof and southern wall clad in corrugated iron. Northern end with corrugated iron skillion-roof supported on timber posts contains covered stalls.
- Former dairy head stalls/store (c. 1900-1950): Three connected corrugated iron sheds of post and beam construction, all with corrugated iron gable roofs. The northern and centre connected sheds at are rectangular in plan with long axes running east to west. The centre shed is wider. The southernmost connected shed is L-shaped in plan. The northern shed in half open of the eastern side, the middle shed is completely open on the eastern side, and the southern shed is open on the northern side and part of the eastern and western sides. The three sheds have earth floors and contain timber stalls and timber feeding troughs. One shed has an old sulky. Also former site of 1870s barn.
- Dairy and milk storage shed (c. 1900-1950): Two connected sheds with corrugated iron gable roofs. The western shed is rectangular in plan with long axes running north to south. It is of timber post and beam construction with a concrete floor and footings, and is open to the north. The eastern shed is taller and square in plan, with a concrete floor and square timber posts and open on all sides. The eastern shed appears to be of a later date.
- Hay shed (c. 1947-1961): Substantial shed of bush pol and beam construction, rectangular in plan and with concrete footings. The shed is open to the east and north, with a corrugated iron roof and corrugated iron clad walls to the west and south.
- Modern hay shed: Modern shed, rectangular in plan, located to the south of the former cream shed. Timber posts with flat metal roof and open on all sides.

=== Movable items ===
There is a considerable collection of movable items relating to the occupation and use of the house and farm stored in the slab cottage and the guest bedroom. The collection was catalogued in 2010 and includes furniture, kitchen utensils, crockery and cutlery, children's toys and objects related to the use of the farm as a dairy. The front garden gate evident in historical photographs is also part of this collection.

=== Condition ===
As at 25 July 2017, the condition of the buildings ranges from fair to good. The house and slab cottage have both had recent conservation works, including propping and bracing and termite treatment. In Hadley Park house the concrete floors have been cut away from walls and sacrificial render applied c. 2010 to arrest rising damp. The slab cottage has been clad in corrugated iron and clear perspex to protect it from the weather.

Hadley Park house and outbuildings, the slab cottage and farm buildings all have a high level of integrity. The landscape between Cranebrook Creek and Nepean River has been reconstructed.

=== Modifications and dates ===
Hadley Park house: Verandah and some internal floors concreted mid-twentieth century. See history for other additions.

== Heritage listing ==
As at 29 August 2018, Hadley Park is of state significance for its historical, aesthetic and representative values, research potential and rarity. Hadley Park is a layered cultural landscape that documents the different historical phases of the Castlereagh area from pre-contact Aboriginal occupation on the Nepean River to early nineteenth century colonial expansion, settlement and development, and later twentieth century extractive industry. Hadley Park an early colonial rural property which dates to one of the earliest phases of European settlement in Australia and documents over 200 years of continued occupation and agricultural land use. The main house and slab cottage provide rare surviving and highly intact evidence of some of the earliest colonial construction methods in Australia. Hadley Park is an excellent and largely unaltered example of an early colonial rural property, including a main house, earlier slab cottage, farm outbuildings and cultural plantings, prominently located on the Nepean River floodplain at Castlereagh.

Hadley Park is a remnant of what was formerly a substantially intact rural colonial landscape of a large scale, and is one of a collection of properties that demonstrate the development of the community of Castlereagh from the colonial period to today.

Hadley Park was listed on the New South Wales State Heritage Register on 20 April 2018 having satisfied the following criteria.

The place is important in demonstrating the course, or pattern, of cultural or natural history in New South Wales.

Hadley Park is of state heritage significance as a layered cultural landscape that documents the different historical phases of the Castlereagh area from pre-contact Aboriginal cultural landscape on the Nepean River to early nineteenth century colonial expansion, settlement and development, and later twentieth century extractive industry. Hadley Park is a remnant of what was formerly a substantially intact rural colonial landscape of a large scale, and is one of a collection of properties in Castlereagh that demonstrate the development of the area from the colonial period to today.

Hadley Park is located on land that is part of a broader Aboriginal cultural landscape that bears evidence of thousands of years of occupation and use by Aboriginal people. The landscape and waterways of the Castlereagh terrace, including Cranebrook lagoon within Hadley Park and the Nepean River, supported many generations of the Mulgowie and Boorooberongal Aboriginal people, who were also present when the first European farms were established on the land.

Hadley Park provides highly intact evidence of an early colonial rural property dating to one of the earliest phases of European settlement in Australia-the period of colonial expansion inland towards the Blue Mountains in the search for land better suited to European farming techniques. The cleared landscape around the house, with small areas of remnant vegetation along the lagoon, and remnant cultivated and fenced paddocks, along with the farm house, slab cottage and domestic garden, demonstrate colonial attitudes and approaches to agriculture and farm planning, including extensive land clearing.

Due to its almost 200-year period of continued occupation and use by a single family, the Hadley-Childs, Hadley Park retains evidence of changing agricultural practices in the Castlereagh area over this period, from crop growing and grazing in the nineteenth century to the proliferation of dairies in the first half of the twentieth century.

The place is important in demonstrating aesthetic characteristics and/or a high degree of creative or technical achievement in New South Wales.

Hadley Park is of state heritage significance for the intact evidence it provides of colonial rural vernacular construction techniques and design, and colonial farm planning. Hadley Park house exemplifies the brick nogging construction style that was commonly used for farm houses in the early colonial period. The use of a jerkin-head roof and false chimney to maintain building symmetry illustrate rural vernacular tastes and styles of the time. The slab cottage, with its split timber framing and feather-edged weatherboard walling, exemplifies this early colonial rural construction technique. Both buildings are largely intact.

The collection of farm buildings set within a domestic garden with fruit trees and peppercorn trees, and with a kitchen garden, typifies nineteenth-century rural lifestyles and tastes. The siting of the buildings on a rise above the Cranebrook lagoon demonstrates the adaptation of European rural estate planning to local conditions.

Viewed against the dramatic backdrop of the Lapstone Monocline, the collection of buildings and plantings, arranged in a north–south line with the Cranebrook lagoon beyond, emphasize the views and therefore the connection to the landscape and other notable features of the area. Hadley Park, with its distinctive white-painted jerkin-head roofed farm house and row of tall Chinese windmill palms, is a landmark of the Castlereagh area, visible from all directions, and retains a significant visual connection to Christ Church on the Cranebrook escarpment.

The place has potential to yield information that will contribute to an understanding of the cultural or natural history of New South Wales.

Hadley Park is of state heritage significance as an assemblage of early colonial buildings, gardens, objects and archaeological resources that provide intact evidence of early construction techniques, estate planning, agriculture and rural life from the early colonial period to today. A process of gradual accretion over 200+ years, but without substantial alterations or additions and with careful conservation works in recent years, has resulted in Hadley Park being an important benchmark site in understanding early colonial rural development, vernacular construction, and rural lives.

Hadley Park has a high potential for a range of archaeological remains associated with significant early phases of European occupation on the property. Potential archaeological features include the remains of former structures, services, silage pits and evidence of former landscaping, gardens, paths and roads. The potential archaeological remains at Hadley Park may yield valuable information relating to the layout and development of the property over time, which could be incorporated into comparative analyses with other early nineteenth century colonial farm complexes in NSW. The potential archaeological resource could also reveal insights into past human-environment interaction on the Nepean River and early methods of sanitation and water supply, as well as past agricultural activity and technologies. Artefacts may also survive in potential underfloor deposits in structures and in yard deposits/refuse pits or dumps. Such artefacts could reveal insights into the personal lives of Hadley Park's former inhabitants and early rural lifestyles in NSW more generally, including diets and consumption patterns.

The place possesses uncommon, rare or endangered aspects of the cultural or natural history of New South Wales.

Hadley Park house and the slab cottage provide rare and unusually intact evidence of some of the earliest colonial construction methods in Australia-brick nogging and slab walling respectively-as well as how these buildings were inhabited and used. The house and cottage are remarkably unaltered, with only minimal intervention in recent years to stabilise and preserve the buildings, meaning that their original construction along with later, minor adaptations such as wallpaper and floor coverings, are all evident. The integrity of these buildings and their ability to accurately demonstrate these early construction techniques, and the way of life of those who occupied such buildings, is rare in NSW.

The combination of buildings including interiors, outbuildings, kitchen garden, farm structures, remnant fences, cultural plantings, remnant native vegetation, archaeology and movable collection show unusually accurate evidence of European occupation of the outer reaches of the colony at the beginning of the nineteenth century, and the establishment and development of agriculture in the Penrith region over 200 years.

The place is important in demonstrating the principal characteristics of a class of cultural or natural places/environments in New South Wales.

Hadley Park is of state heritage significance as a representative, highly intact example of a colonial rural property with associated buildings and landscape. It demonstrates the principal characteristics of this class of items, including an intact Georgian two-storey brick homestead, earlier slab cottage, farm outbuildings (including a dairy, dairy stalls and hay shed) and cultural plantings including peppercorn trees, fruit trees and remnant native vegetation. Together these elements demonstrate attributes typical of rural lifestyles in Sydney from the early colonial period to the mid twentieth century.

Hadley Park house is an outstanding representative example of the more modest colonial homesteads built by smaller landholders in NSW. It is little changed since its construction c. 1811 and demonstrates the key characteristics of the type, including brick nogging construction, jerkin-head roof, false chimney to maintain symmetry, wrap-around verandah, and dirt or brick paved ground floor. The slab cottage is also an outstanding representative example of these types of buildings, with much of its early fabric intact.

Hadley Park also forms part of a group which collectively illustrates a colonial cultural landscape in western Sydney. It is one of a series of properties that relate to the development of the Nepean River floodplain at Castlereagh for food production for the young colony, including neighbouring Nepean Park, and the properties of Landers Inn, McCarthys Cemetery, the Methodist Church Group and Cemetery, and the Upper Castlereagh school house and school master's residence.
