= Jack Murray (racing driver) =

Australian racing driver

John Eric Murray (30 August 1907 – 11 December 1983), generally known as Jack Murray or 'Gelignite' Jack, was an Australian racing driver and sportsman, most remembered for his participation in the REDEX Round Australia Reliability Trials in the 1950s.

== History ==
Murray was born in Port Melbourne, Victoria, to Walter James Murray (orchardist in 1907) and his wife Alice Maud Murray, née Carse.

He was educated at Albert Park School, leaving at age 14 to work in a bicycle shop building pushbikes and working with cars, helping the mechanic. Jack laboured throughout rural Victoria, grape picking at Mildura, driving a tractor in Sea Lake, Victoria, and even worked as a diver's attendant on the Murray River for a few months until the river flooded. He soon was involved in motor racing activities, and in 1932 moved to Sydney, where he worked for a company testing Chrysler cars. By 1933 Jack and his brother Ray had a garage and service station 'Auto Service Ltd'. (unconfirmed) or 'Murray Bros', at the corner of Roscoe and Gould Streets, Bondi, which they ran until the mid-1930s. At this time, they purchased and moved their business, then called 'Murray Bros', to 94 Curlewis St, Bondi.

During World War 2, for about a year spanning 1944 to 1945, Murray was contracted to serve with the US Army Small Ships Section, based mostly at Finschhafen, Papua New Guinea, aboard a maintenance ship called The Half Rufus.

After the war, Jack and Ray continued their business at 94 Curlewis Street, Bondi, (referred to by all and sundry simply as 'The Garage') which they operated together from the mid-1930s to late 1971 when Ray Murray retired. There was a major fire which gutted The Garage late on the night of 30 April 1981. Repairs were made and the roof reinstated. Jack continued to own The Garage until his death in 1983. Ownership passed to his widow, Ena Murray (23 April 1915 – 24 July 2005), until her death in 2005. Their two sons, John and Philip, inherited the Garage jointly from their mother. From May 2017 The Garage was jointly owned by Murray's older son John Vivian Murray and John's son, i.e. Jack Murray's grandson, John Charles "Jonny" Murray. Three generations of Murray, including two sets of brothers have continuously owned The Garage since the mid-1930s. In 2017–2018 The Garage was leased by 'Carology'. The Garage has been leased as a mechanical workshop for over 40 years.

== Motor sport ==
Murray set the Hartley Hill (near Mount Victoria, Blue Mountains) hill climbing record in a Terraplane in 1933.

In 1937 Murray embarked on an around the world trip travelling through Europe and America. He was a spectator at race events in Britain and also the AVUS circuit in Germany, where he saw 'a little guy who was all pomp' – Adolf Hitler.

Murray raced at many Australian circuits during his career, including Gnoo Blas, Orange where he held the lap record, Adelaide's Rowley Park Speedway, the Sydney Showground, Mount Druitt, Parramatta Park, Nowra, Marsden Park, Castlereagh Airstrip, Southport, Phillip Island, and Mount Panorama.

In 1952 Murray won the Australian Sprint Championships, held at Castlereagh airstrip, driving his Cadillac-Allard J2.

In the 1964 Senior Trials Championship, Jack came second and Dave Johnson, good friend and fellow inductee into the Australian Rally Hall of Fame, won best navigator.

Crossroads Alice 1965

Murray enjoyed testing motor vehicles and oils, as well as travel — any opportunity or excuse where a group of mates could get together and set off on an adventure of some kind. He and Evan Green frequently paired up to share the fun. During November and December 1965, the duo undertook just such an adventure, one that became the documentary film Crossroads Alice. The trip was designed as a test of BMC (Austin 1800 and a Morris Mini Deluxe) cars and Castrol oil. The vehicles completed a 12,000-mile (19,312 km) Figure 8 crossing of the Australian continent. Over the years 'Gelignite' Jack competed in seven round Australia trials and many adventure trips testing cars, lubricants and drivers.

Murray competed in both the 1966 and 1967 Southern Cross Rallies driving a Prince Skyline GT with registration plates JM789. (DNF both events).

Car versus Plane 1968

As Murray and Evan Green were preparing to compete in the London to Sydney marathon later that year, the question was: ‘How could two rally tested veterans best prepare for days and nights of endless driving?’ Clearly, the answer was: ‘Spend days and nights endlessly driving. But why not make it interesting, and race a plane as well?’ Another adventure lay ahead.

At noon on Friday 26 April 1968, Jack and Evan set off from Essendon Airport, Melbourne, to race a Morris 1100 cc ‘S’ against a light plane around Australia. The boys drove day and night, living in the car, and managed to circumnavigate the continent in eight days and six hours, covering around 10,000 miles (16,000 km) in 197 hours and 40 minutes.

The details are a testament to both Jack's and Evan's endurance and ability to spend many hours behind the wheel. The tachograph showed 192 hours 45 minutes, which included 22 hours 15 minutes of breaks (12 percent of time), covering 9,682 miles (15,581 km) with an average speed of 91 km/h (if taken on actual driving time) or 80 km/h on average overall. Top speed between Norseman and Carnarvon reached 82 mph (132 km/h).

The light plane was restricted to flying during the day only. The plane was restricted to eight hours a day as neither pilot was licensed to fly at night. The car crossed the finish line in Melbourne only eight hours after the plane.

Car versus train 1971

Murray and his radio mate John Pearce teamed up again to undertake a 'Race the Train' dash from Sydney to Perth. This nonstop drive took 46 hours, and the boys ended up beating the train by an easy seventeen hours.

=== Mount Panorama events ===
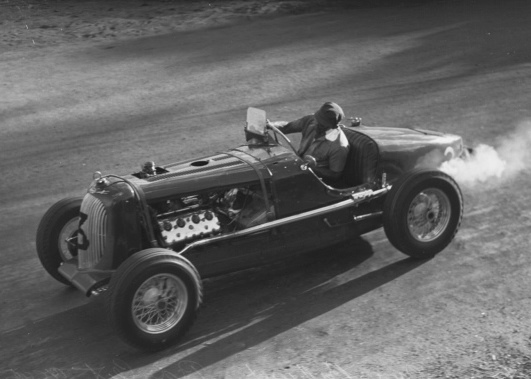
The Mackellar Special of Jack Murray at the 1946 New South Wales Grand Prix.

- Murray was a competitor at the 1946 NSW Grand Prix in a Bugatti/Ford Special previously owned by Ron Mackellar. He was fastest overall (1 hr 26 mins 24 secs for the 100 miles) and second-fastest (109 mph, 175 km/h) on the ‘flying quarter’ section, but fifth in the (handicapped) race. He declined the prize cheque, as he had his eyes set on representing Australia in the wrestling event of the 1948 Olympic Games, and did not want to lose his amateur status. Jack was NSW State Wrestling Champion in his 84 kg division in 1946. Jack asked the chairman of the organising committee to divide the £65 prize money between the Bathurst and Woolloomooloo Police Boys’ Clubs in order to retain his amateur sportsman/wrestler status.
- He competed in the 1947 Australian Grand Prix in a Bugatti Type 39/Ford 3.6L known as the Day Special, but was forced to retire having completed 29 of 38 laps.
- He competed in the 1948 NSW Hundred at Mount Panorama in the 'Day Special' finishing 9th. The Day Special was variously referred to as a 'Bugatti-Ford' or 'Edelbrock', as the 1925 built, Type 39 Bugatti chassis had been subsequently fitted with either an Edelbrock or Grancor Ford V8 engine. He raced the 'Day Special' again in the 1949 All Powers Long Handicap but did not finish. The Day Special frequently overheated. But Jack fared better in the 1950 New South Wales 100, when he placed fourth, with a flying quarter mile speed of 119.2 mph(192 km/h), the Day Special now equipped with a Grancor V8 engine.
- In March 1951 Murray competed in the REDEX Bathurst 100 in an Allard J2/Cadillac 4.4L. He also drove an Allard J2 in the REDEX 50 Mile Championship in October 1951, but was forced to retire in both of these events. He drove the Allard/Cadillac in the 1952 Australian Grand Prix, and came fourth, and the Bugatti/Ford Day Special in the 1954 Bathurst 100, when he came seventh.
- The 1967 Gallaher 500 was held at Bathurst Mount Panorama on 1 October 1967. This would prove to his last race on the Mount Panorama circuit.

The year 1967 marked a 21-year career span for Murray racing at Bathurst. He had raced the Mackellar Special, the Day Special, two Cadillac-Allards, a D-Type Jaguar and sedans such as a Ford Pilot, Ford Cortina GT, Morris Elite and Prince Skyline GT.

Murray set the fastest time in the 100-mile 1946 New South Wales Grand Prix at Mount Panorama.

In 1950 He won an event recording the fastest lap time, reaching 119 mph (192 km/h) down Conrod Straight.

In 1952, driving the Cadillac-Allard J2, Jack placed a credible fourth in the seventeenth Australian Grand Prix.

Throughout his 21 years of driving at Bathurst, Jack achieved many scratch, handicap or class placings: first (1), second (2), third (7), fourth (6), fifth (4), sixth (1), seventh (1), ninth (1), thirteenth (1), fifteenth (1) and thirty-fourth (1). Of course, race cars being race cars, there were a few DNFs and DNSs.

In 1960, in his D-Type Jaguar, he was clocked at 150 mph (240 km/h) down Conrod Straight.

In 1965, almost 20 years after first racing at Bathurst, the 'old men in wheelchairs' Murray (58) and Bill McLachlan (48) placed fifth overall and third in class driving a Ford Cortina Mk 1 GT 500. The younger brigade took note.

=== The REDEX Reliability Trials ===
There were three major REDEX (Note: REDEX was a motor vehicle oil additive and Reg Shepheard, an Englishman who came to Australia, owned the selling agent rights. Car clubs and motoring magazines had proffered the idea of a round Australia car trial since before the war, but it was Shepheard's offer of sponsorship and his endeavours to promote and advertise REDEX that enabled the trials to become a reality.) Reliability car trials held in successive years: 1953, 1954 and 1955. It is a little-known fact that there was also a series of much shorter REDEX 1000 trials held in the months preceding the long distance REDEX events. In both 1953 and 1954, Jack had class wins in these events – a portent of things to come. In 1954 there were also REDEX motorcycle and REDEX plane events.

These events were not races as such, nor were they 'rallies'. Rallies are timed to the second, not minute, and are more often conducted on closed roads, rather than open public roads. The winner of a rally is the fastest car from A to B. The REDEX events were termed 'reliability trials'. Very strict rules ensured that vehicles available to the general public were used, with few modifications, and replacement of parts was strictly limited. Along the way, competitors were required to meet and comply with set times established between control points. Being more than five minutes early or late on their scheduled time of arrival at fixed controls attracted a one-point penalty for each minute discrepancy. A margin of three minutes late or early per hour was allowed for secret controls to allow for possible speedometer error, and discrepancies between officials' and competitors' watches. It was a nervous navigator's worst nightmare.

The competitors who completed the trials with the lowest number of accumulated penalty points were declared the winners. Elimination sections, used to separate and test both competitors and cars, were a feature of the REDEX trials. Seemingly unrealistic and unobtainable times were often set between control points on these difficult sections.

1953 REDEX 1,000 Mile Trial

This 24-hour event was staged over 2 and 3 May, starting and ending in Sydney and ran through the Blue Mountains and the back roads behind the Jenolan Caves. It had been made the 'hardest ever' by torrential rain; Murray won his Class A (395 pts lost) and came second overall to D. H. (Peter) Antill (305 pts lost), one of only nine to complete the course.

During this trial, at one stage Jack became lost. Australian Motor Sports, June 1953, wrote:

'Still no track, and then salvation. A swagman was strolling down the road towards them. Firing a few questions at him and then sweeping him into the back of the Customline, Murray slid the car into the bush at the pointed out place and commenced a fearful dice down to the control. Their at-first willing passenger became petrified in the rear. As the car slithered to a halt at the control the swagman was out like a flash and into the scrub.' Only in Australia, and certainly only back in the 1950s, would a swagman ever come to the navigational rescue of a competition trial car.

1953 REDEX Reliability Trial

Jack Murray and Bill Murray (no relation) failed to finish, their Chrysler Plymouth having rolled between Cloncurry and Mount Isa. When interviewed by a news team shortly after the crash, every second word of Jack Murray's response had to be expurgated, a source of delight to many.

The rollover in 1953 gave rise to one of the most frequently told anecdotes about 'Gelignite' Jack Murray. It became Evan Green's favourite story about his larrikin mate. Evan even opened his book Journeys with Gelignite Jack (first published in 1966 by Rigby) with the story:

As another concerned competitor slowed to a stop next to the overturned wrecked Plymouth in '53, the ever-present dust cloud drifted on by. A voice yelled out:

"What happened? You all right?"
"Got a ring spanner?" Jack called back. "Nine-sixteenths SAE?"

Thinking ... followed by the puzzled query: "A ring spanner. What the hell do you want that for?"

"I thought I'd do the brakes while the wheels were up like this." Silence ... then everyone started to laugh, even the poor "No Relation" Bill: bleeding, concussed and nursing a very sore head.

1954 REDEX 1,000 Mile Trial

Murray won this little-noticed 24-hour event losing only 5 points, run entirely within New South Wales, followed by another, sponsored by Kriesler, an Australian manufacturer of car radios and other consumer electronics.

1954 REDEX Reliability Trial

Murray and his navigator, the unrelated Bill Murray won this Trial in a 1948, Canadian built, Ford V8 with registration plates JM456, losing no points on the trip. The car was dubbed the 'Grey Ghost' by famous cricketer 'Ginty' Lush because of its grey 'undercoat' colour. Newspapers and magazine articles often erroneously describe the big Ford V8 as an 'ex-taxi'. This is not the case. Jack bought the black vehicle second hand and repainted it grey. It was on this trial that Murray gained his nickname, from his occasional celebratory detonation of sticks of gelignite. "They christened me 'Gelignite Jack' after the big bang in the tin outhouse at Townsville Showground", he is quoted as saying. "Gelignite wouldn't hurt a flea out in the open. It's just the same as a cracker, only louder."

Bill Murray, navigator and co-driver, was a construction and explosives expert. The two Murrays took boxes of gelignite on the trial with the intention of clearing any fallen trees or other obstacles blocking the narrow outback roads. It was never used or required for this intended purpose. The gelignite became Jack's toy.

Despite his 'larrikin' image, Murray was a non-smoker and teetotaler who did not take unnecessary risks. The Murrays lost no points on the entire route.

1955 REDEX Reliability Trial

'Gelignite' Jack Murray described the 1955 REDEX Trial as a "shemozzle".

The exact details of what took place are contentious. As the trial neared completion, an originally unplanned diversion adjoining Werong Station (near Murrumbateman and Wee Jasper, 12 km south of Yass), designed to determine the winner, meant that some cars and their drivers were bogged for ten hours or more. Jack did not go through the bog section as he summed it up when he saw the first car bogged. So, he turned around and went through a route check the wrong way and thought he would have copped a penalty, but the bog section was eventually cancelled. Jack, with his brother Ray as navigator, was running third at that stage, with the loss of only 36 points.

In protest at the issuing of extra instructions in Melbourne, that took cars through the boggy, impassable paddock, Murray did not submit his car for scrutineering 'within the requisite time, and thus Car 46 could not be considered among those competitors who fulfilled all requirements in that direction and therefore cannot be regarded as having finished the Trial.' He was disqualified. Jack had accumulated 56 road points by the end, thus forfeiting a possible fourth place. Car No 129 (B. Rogers in a Holden) and Car No 36 (N. Klinger in a Standard Vanguard), also protested the officials' decision to run the field through a mud bog by refusing to submit their cars for scrutiny. As confirmed by Hal Moloney, Australian Trial and Rally Historian: 'Jack's point loss at the Canberra Control was 56 points which had him in 5th place. No cars were penalised for the Werong Station bog. Had Jack checked in at Sydney where Sam Hecker's Holden, originally equal third with Malcolm Brooks Vanguard, was penalised for structural damage at scrutineering, Jack would have ended up 4th outright on 56 points lost except - for the not booking-in/scrutineering fiasco.'

Throughout the trial, particularly towards the end and even post-trial, controversy and arguments reigned. Newspaper headlines were full of emotion as they proclaimed REDEX Boilover and Hopeless Mixup.

Murray did not attend the Ball, at which the winners should have been announced but were not, due to unresolved protests. It was indeed, a shemozzle.

There was no 1956 Redex Trial.

1956 Ampol Trial

Murray and his brother Ray Murray were put out of contention when one of the 'Grey Ghost's' stub axles and its king pin broke, but he was able to get back on the road with a loss of only 70 points thanks to fellow-competitor Robert Whan, who allowed Murray to cannibalize his own car, which had crashed into a tree. He lost 69 further points when he took a wrong turn after Mt Isa, and ended up at the Mary Kathleen uranium fields. Jack denied he'd got lost. 'I've got shares in that company,' he said, 'I just wanted to see how it was getting on.'

1957 Ampol Trial

Murray and Neville Vale were forced to pull out shortly after leaving Birdsville, when their Fiat 1100 (Note: Not to be confused with another competitor, John Mornder Murray of Ashgrove, Queensland, who with his daughter Kerry was also in a Fiat.) ('Little Ghost') broke an axle. Jack walked back into town and when questioned replied that he was 'testing some new type of shoes'.

CAMS Dispute

In the mid-1950s a battle for control and administration of motorsport was raging within Australia, and the drivers were caught in the middle. The Sydney-based Trials Clubs of NSW broke away from the Melbourne-based Confederation of Australian Motor Sport (CAMS) following a dispute about the allocation of rights to a Round Australia Trial for 1956.

The dispute centred around sponsorship by either Ampol or Mobilgas and a power struggle between CAMS and NSW clubs. It affected drivers throughout 1956 and 1957. Thirty drivers, including 'Gelignite' Jack Murray were banned for competing in events which were not CAMS sanctioned. Murray was banned for 2 years.

Wheels, the Sport (April 1956) wrote:

'We believe that those who drove in spite of CAMS' warning in the 1955 Mobilgas Economy Run were harshly treated and that this has been the main cause of the unsightly squabble between the majority of NSW clubs and CAMS.'

Once again, conflict, disagreement and protest were an integral part of motorsport.

1957 Mobilgas Trial

Murray never competed in any Mobilgas Trials due to the CAMS dispute, but did enter the 1955 Mobilgas Economy Run together with Bill McLachlan driving a Ford Consul. The boys came last! Clearly, saving fuel and economy driving were neither Bill's nor Jack's forté.

However, in the 1957 Mobilgas Trial another Jack Murray drove a Chrysler Royal

There is often confusion between 'Gelignite' Jack Murray and 'Milko' Jack Murray. The two Jacks were contemporaries, both racing and rally drivers and sometimes even competed in the same events. The private real estate development "Murray's Rise" near Branxton, Belford and Pokolbin was named after 'Milko' Jack Murray.

1958 Ampol Trial

Once again CAMS was licensing Ampol events. Calmer heads had prevailed and peace had broken out. With 148 starters, the 7,000-mile event focused on eastern Australia. Australian Motor Sports, July 1958, wrote:

Jack Murray was only six points down, but during the next day's stage to Adelaide a misread signpost took him 30 miles off course along a bush track, and the howling rainstorm mingled with his tears at Burra, where he shed a whole 75 points. At Port Augusta he was seen chasing navigator Dave Johnson with an axe.

Murray's great mate and fellow Rally Hall of Fame inductee Dave Johnson, fortunately, was too quick for an axe-wielding Jack back in 1958.

Armstrong 500

Murray drove a Simca Aronde in the 1960 Armstrong 500 held at Phillip Island (DNF), a Morris Major Elite in the 1963 Armstrong 500 held at Mount Panorama (15th), and a Ford Cortina Mk.I GT500 in the 1965 Armstrong 500 (3rd in Class D and 5th overall).

Gallaher 500

He drove a Prince Skyline 1500 in the 1966 Gallaher 500 (DNF) and the 1967 Gallaher 500 (13th in Class, 34th overall) production car races.

The Armstrong 500 and Gallaher 500 races preceded the series of Hardie-Ferodo 1000 races held at Bathurst, which in 2018 are referred to as the Bathurst 1000 or simply the Great Race. The Mount Panorama circuit is an Australian motorsport icon.

1964 Ampol Trial
'Gelignite' Jack and 'Cracker' Jack

The 1964 Ampol Round Australia Trial, covering 7500 miles, attracted 200 entrants. It commenced on 14 June 1964 and ran for two weeks. This was an important trial for a number of reasons, not least of which was that 56-year-old 'Gelignite' Jack Murray would face some very special competition – namely his twenty-year-old son John, under the moniker 'Cracker Jack'. John had 'Jack Murray Jnr' written on the side of his car, and his mate Peter Barnes was the navigator.

'Cracker' Jack Murray, driving a lime-green Valiant sponsored by Milo lost 262 points and placed thirty-third. 'Gelignite' Jack in Car No 54C with Roy Denny as navigator placed fortieth in a Peugeot 404 plate HYT 276, with the loss of 333 pts. The junior apprentice beat the senior master. John's win was memorialized on the walls of the 'Garage'.

1968 London to Sydney Marathon

'Gelignite' Jack took part in this event with Evan Green and George Shepheard as the BMC works team in an Austin 1800, arriving in 21st place.

As they raced across the Nullarbor and into South Australia, Murray's and Green's Car No 31 was the race leader in the Flinders Ranges stage. Then tragedy struck, as they ran fifth, only 36 hours from the finish line. An enthusiastic service mechanic over-tightened a wheel bearing, and the hub collapsed near Curnamona, South Australia. Evan commented at the time, "But for losing a wheel, Jack Murray, George Shepheard [veteran Australian driver] and I might have won."

The other J. Murray (Jack 'Milko' Murray) and Bert Madden came 54th in an HK Holden Monaro, sponsored by Maitland Motors.

1970 World Cup Rally

Murray participated in this event, which ran from London to Mexico City, but did not finish.

Murray and Evan Green, as drivers, teamed up with Hamish Cardno (of Motor magazine) as navigator in the London to Mexico Marathon. Car No 92 was a British Leyland works entry Triumph Mk.2 2.5PI. Right from the start a blockage problem with the fuel injection system emerged. This recurring problem was later attributed to a valve guide disintegrating and shedding crumbs of metal.

A crash in France in which the Triumph was driven over a cliff and hit some trees did not help matters. With Cardno driving, the Triumph left the road, rolling and spinning down a hill near Rouaine in the French Alps. Fortunately, no one was injured. The car was pulled out, hammered into shape and the boys drove on. (The Courier-Mail, April 1970) It took the Andes, however, to finally put Car No 92, out of the rally. The Triumph did not arrive at the Santiago checkpoint within the time limit and was eliminated.

1977 London to Sydney Marathon

Murray took part in this event in a Peugeot 504TI, Car No 68, with other Australians Bruce Mudd and Geoff Perry but did not finish. While showing initial promise, Car No 68 was plagued by bad luck that culminated in a crash involving a tractor and other mayhem near Agra, India.

Evan Green competed separately, in Car No 39, a Range Rover sponsored by Endrust Australia Ltd.

1979 Repco Trial

This was to be 'Gelignite' Jack Murray's last competitive motorsport event, held in August 1979. Murray, his elder son John with mate Jeff d'Albora competed in a Dick Smith-sponsored Holden Commodore No.28, with number plates JM456 as used on the old 'Grey Ghost', finished 23rd or 29th, depending on your source.

== Family ==
John Eric Murray married Ena May Byrne on 3 July 1942 at the (Anglican) Church of St Jude, Randwick; Jack purchased a block of three home units and the family home was at 3/24 Derby Street, Vaucluse. Jack and Ena had two sons; John Vivian Murray (b. 16/11/1943 d. 11/01/2025) and Philip Eric Murray (b. 1954).

Jack and Ena Murray remained married until Jack's death in 1983. However, in 1958, Murray met Dorothy Rosewell (born 1931), real estate agent, business woman and fellow competitor in the Ampol Trial of that year. They fell in love. Their relationship blossomed, grew and also endured until Jack's death. It was a love that spanned 25 years. In many ways Murray led dual lives and crammed the experiences, travel, sports and sheer zest for life of at least two men into his 76 years.

In early December 1980 Jack was hospitalised with blood circulation problems, and had his right leg amputated above the knee.

'Just as well I can ski on one foot!' was Jack's first comment.

'Gelignite' Jack Murray was admitted to St Vincent's Hospital in October 1983 with a cardiovascular disease and died ten weeks later on 11 December 1983.

== Other interests ==
'Gelignite' Jack's sporting interests and achievements were eclectic and far ranging.

In his own words, at different times throughout his life he was 'engaged in various sports with various successes': cycling; VFL schoolboy football; stock car racing; hill climbing motor races; circuit car racing; car endurance events; Australian and NSW Grand Prix racing; international and Australian rally driving; wrestling; boxing; crocodile, kangaroo and buffalo hunting; ocean boat racing and waterskiing – to name most, but not all. Jack even raced a bathtub once, plug in.

As a young man, Murray was a champion amateur wrestler and was a member of the North Bondi Surf Lifesaving Club.

During an amateur wrestling career spanning seventeen years (1930–46), he won no fewer than thirteen NSW State Championships:

74 kg: 1930, 1931, 1932, 1933 and 1934; JE Murray was NSW State Champion five times.

84 kg: 1930, 1931, 1935, 1938, 1940, 1941, 1945 and 1946; J. E. Murray was NSW State Champion eight times.

In both 1930 and 1931, Jack not only won the lower weight division but also competed in and won the next higher weight division, defeating considerably larger opponents.

If he had not lost two crucial matches to his close friend, Jack 'Spud' O'Hara, Jack would have represented Australia at both the 1934 London Empire Games and at the 1936 Berlin Olympic Games.

In 1964, Murray and Keith Whitehead won the inaugural Sydney‑Newcastle‑Sydney Ocean Race, in a Bertram boat called Tact.

Murray was an expert waterskier. He was not the first person to waterski in Australia. However, due to his pioneering involvement, including securing sponsorship for the initial Bridge to Bridge ski race, and his extensive promotion and participation in the sport, he is often referred to as the 'father of waterskiing' in Australia. Jack was a life member of the NSW Water Ski Association and holds the distinction of being one of a group of seven who first barefooted in Australia.

Murray, together with Canadian born scientist Professor Harry Messel, taught Wernher von Braun, former Nazi SS Officer and "father of the American space program" to waterski on the Hawkesbury River.

Murray's favourite ski location was originally Jervis Bay, then subsequently Sackville and the Hawkesbury River, near Sydney, and Shoal Bay, Port Stephens.

== Recognition ==
- Murray was the subject of a book Journeys with Gelignite Jack, Rigby Limited, first published 1966, by his lifelong friend, eminent motor racer and motoring journalist Evan Green about an outback journey they undertook for the Castrol company. A new edition, Hit the Road, Jack, was published in 1991 by Pan Macmillan
- On 3 March 1978, he was the Guest of Honour on the popular TV show This Is Your Life. The show was hosted by Roger Climpson and shown on the Channel 7 network.
- In April 1984 a monument bearing his name was erected at Shoal Bay, New South Wales, where he holidayed regularly.
- Murray featured as a major character in Dust and Glory, a 1990 novel by Evan Green. The action of the novel takes place in the fictitious 1956 REDEX Trial (the last REDEX Reliability Trial was in 1955) and several other real-life characters appear, notably the radio star Jack Davey, who in the book wants to be taken seriously as a rally driver not for his celebrity value.
- In 2013 'Gelignite' Jack Murray was inducted into the Australian Rally Hall of Fame.
- In March 2016 he was an inaugural inductee into the Australian Motor Sport Hall of Fame. (Confederation of Australian Motorsports, CAMS). The CAMS Hall of Fame incorporates all facets of the sport. A gala dinner was held in Melbourne prior to the 2016 Australian Grand Prix. The induction was accepted on Jack's behalf jointly by younger son Phil and Jack's grandson, Jonny Murray who enjoyed a successful rally career, most notably with Subaru. 'Gelignite' Jack Murray, son John Vivian Murray and grandson John Charles "Jonny" Murray (born 1981) – the motorsport rally gene was shared by three generations of Murrays.
- In 2017, Peter Carey's novel A Long Way from Home tells the tale of a REDEX Trial, mentions 'Gelignite' Jack and features a character called 'Dangerous Dan' who has 'Gelignite' Jack's penchant for explosives.

== Biography ==
Phil Murray (Jack's younger son) (2017). 'Gelignite' Jack Murray: An Aussie Larrikin Legend. New Holland Publishing. Foreword by Dick Smith.
