= 1948 New South Wales Hundred =

Layout of the Mount Panorama Circuit (1938-1986)

The 1948 New South Wales Hundred was a motor race staged at the Mount Panorama Circuit near Bathurst in New South Wales, Australia on 29 March 1948. The race, which was organised by the Australian Sporting Car Club, was contested on a handicap basis over 25 laps, a distance of 100 miles.

The race was won by John Barraclough driving an MG NE Magnette. A protest against Barraclough by the second placed driver, alleging inaccuracies in the entrance certificate, was dismissed.

Alf Barrett (Alfa Romeo) registered the fastest time for the 100 miles, setting a new record for this distance. Barrett also set a new lap record. Lex Davison (Alfa Romeo) attained a speed of 144 mph during the race. This was believed to be the fastest speed ever recorded on an Australian racing circuit to this time.

== Results ==
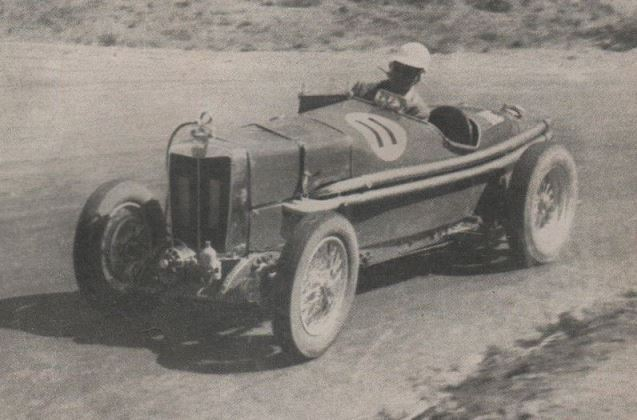
John Barraclough won the race driving an MG NE Magnette

Pos.	Driver	No.	Car	Handicap	Race time	Laps
1	John Barraclough	11	MG NE Magnette s/c	18:30	90:18	25
2	Harry Monday	16	Mercury Special	15:30	87:59	25
3	Curley Brydon	28	MG TC	21:00	93:52	25
4	John Nind	18	MG TB Special	17:00	91:38	25
5	Bill Patterson	22	MG TC	21:00	95:47	25
6	George Pearse	26	MG TB	20:00	95:09	25
7	Elliott Forbes-Robinson	32	MG TC	21:00	97:32	25
8	Alf Barrett	3	Alfa Romeo Monza s/c	03:00	80:47	25
9	Jack Murray	5	Day Special	10:00	86:38	25
10	Ron Ward	27	MG TB	21:00	97:50	25
DNF	Frank Walters	17	Plymord	15:30		21
DNF	Alby Johnson	29	MG TC	21:00		15
DNF	Arthur Rizzo	20	Riley Special	17:00		15
DNF	Reg Ewing	25	Spike Special	25:00		13
DNF	Bill Ford	10	Hudson 6 Special	13:30		13
DNF	Lex Davison	1	Alfa Romeo s/c	00:00		12
DNF	Tom Sulman	34	Sulman Singer	22:00		10
DNF	Tony Mann	30	MG TB Special	21:00		10
DNF	Dick Bland	14	Mercury Special	14:30		8
DNF	Ray Mitchell	15	Ford V8 Jeep Special	14:30		5
DNF	Alf Najar	19	MG TB Special	17:00		3
DNF	Frank Kleinig	4	Kleinig Hudson	06:30		3
DNF	Bill Conoulty	24	Conoulty 500	20:00		2
DNF	Tony Gaze	2	HRG Aerodynamic	18:30		2
DNF	Clive Adams	23	Alvis FWD s/c	20:00		0
DNS	Tony Gaze	2	Alta	1:00		-
DNS	Norman Andrews	6	Stewand	10:30		-
DNS	Lipman Nathan	7	Mercury Bugatti	12:30		-
DNS	John Snow	8	BMW 328	13:30		-
DNS	Ron Ewing	9	Mercury Special	13:30		-
DNS	K.V. Tubman	12	MG NE Magnette	14:00		-
DNS	Jack Johnson	31	MG TC	21:00		-
DNS	Peter Critchley	33	MG TC	21:00		-
DNS	Fred Elbourne	35	MG N Magnette	22:00		-

=== Notes ===
- Starters: 25
- Finishers: 10
- Limit starter: Reg Ewing
- Scratch starter: Lex Davison
- Winner's average speed: Nearly 70 mph
- Fastest lap & new lap record: Alf Barrett, 3:01
- Fastest time: Alf Barrett, 80:47
- Attendance: Between 15,000 and 20,000
