= 1946 New South Wales Grand Prix =

Layout of the Mount Panorama Circuit (1938–1986)

The 1946 New South Wales Grand Prix was a motor race staged at the Mount Panorama Circuit near Bathurst in New South Wales, Australia on 7 October 1946. It was contested as a handicap event with the first of the 22 cars starting 22 minutes and 2 seconds before the last two starters.

The race was won by Alf Najar driving an MG TB Monoposto.

== Results ==
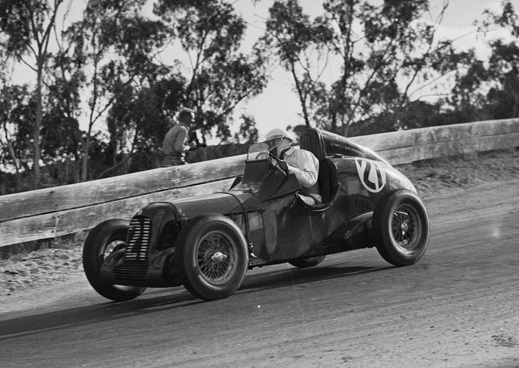
Race winner Alf Najar (MG TB) contesting the 1946 New South Wales Grand Prix

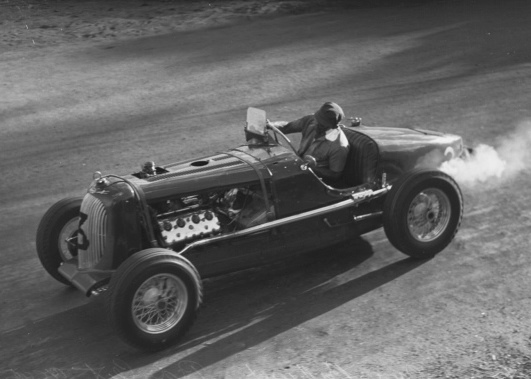
The fifth placed Mackellar Special of Jack Murray. The combination recorded the fastest race time.

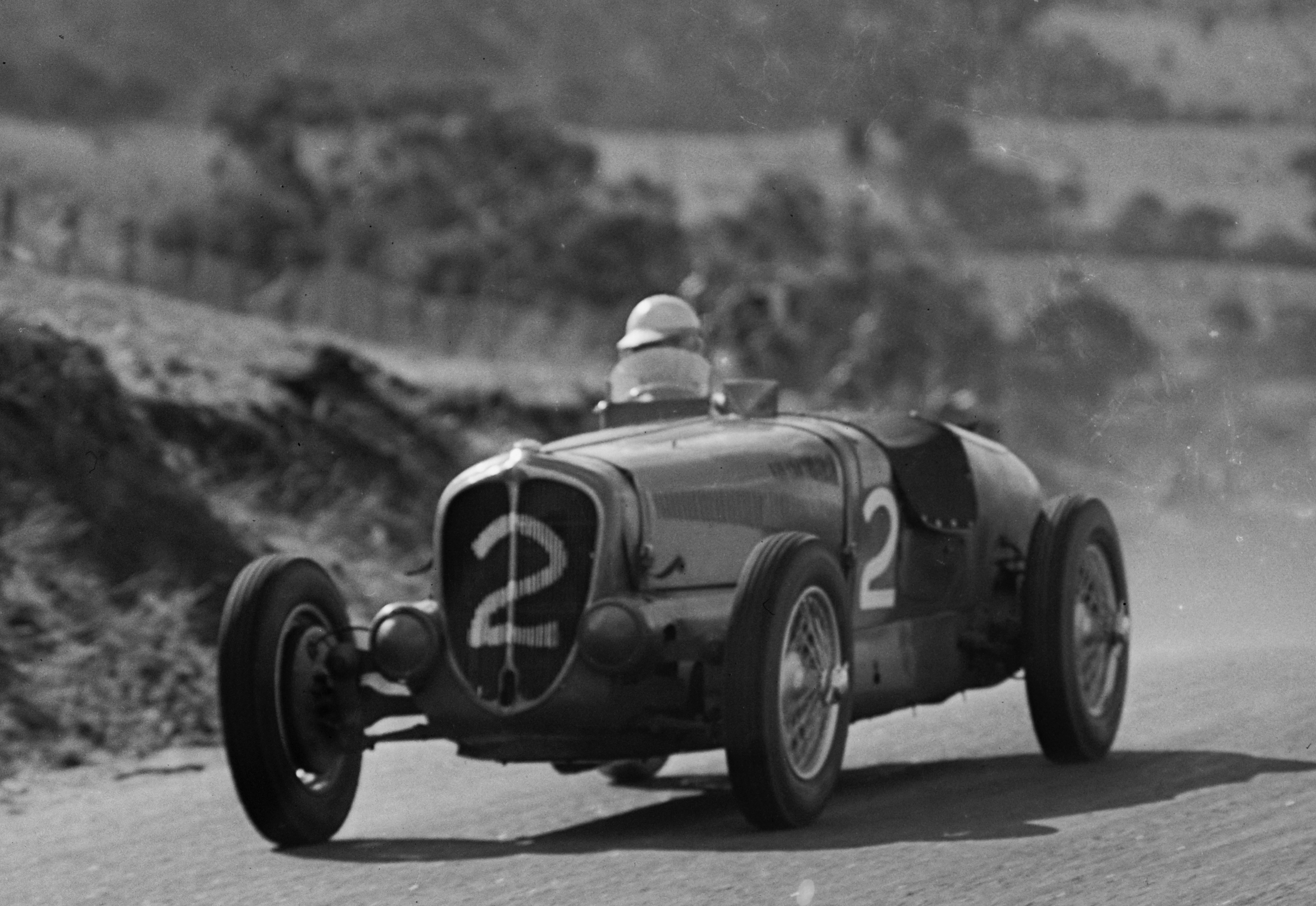
The seventh placed Delahaye 135 driven by John Crouch.

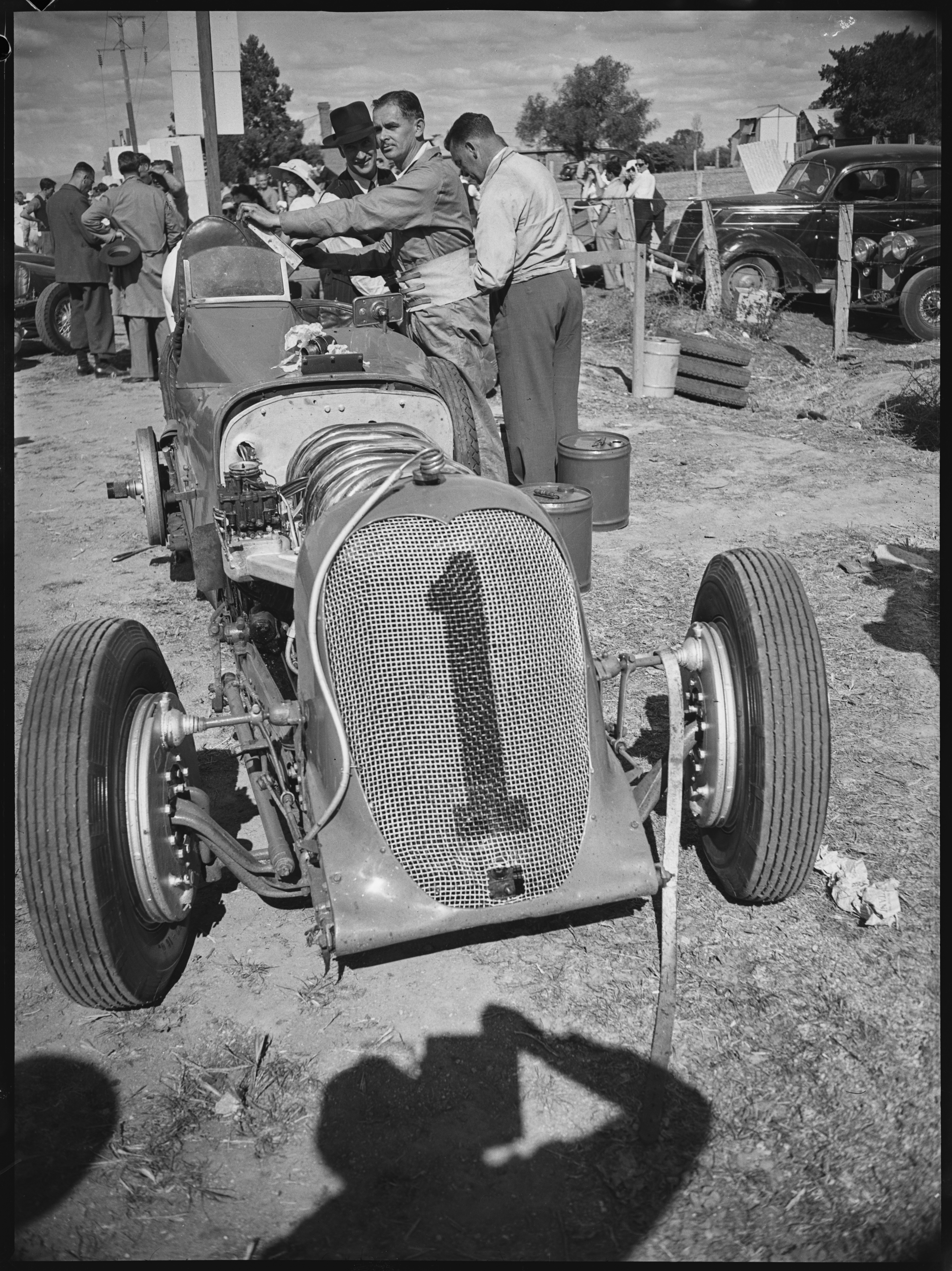
The Hudson Eight Special of Frank Kleinig retired from the race but set fastest lap

Position	Driver	No.	Car	Entrant	Handicap	Laps	Time / Remarks
1	Alf Najar	21	MG TB Monoposto	A.S. Najar	7:00	25	1-33-19
2	Jack Nind	22	MG TB Special	J.P. Nind	7:00	25	1-33-45
3	Alby Johnson	26	MG TC	A.V. Johnson	3:00	25	1-39-59
4	Ted Gray	5	Alfa Romeo Ford	E.W. Gray	14:30	25	1-31-12
5	Jack Murray	3	Mackellar Special (Bugatti Ford s/c)	J.E. Murray	21:00	25	1-26.24
6	Walter Mathison	18	Jaguar SS100	W. Mathison	10:00	25	1-37-30
7	John Crouch	2	Delahaye 135	J.F. Crouch	22:02	25	1-26-34
NC	Chas Whatmore	12	Ford V8 Special	C.W. Whatmore	12:30	25	Finished outside race time limit
DNF	Bill MacLachlan	23	MG TA Monoposto	D.A. McLauchlan	7:00	24	Silted radiator core
NC	Arthur Emerson	27	MG TA	A. Emerson	1:00	23	Flagged off course - time limit expired
DNF	Bill Murray	9	Hudson Special	W.B. Murray	13:36	23	Crashed
DNF	Alec Mildren	8	Ford V8 Special	A.G. Mildren	13:36	19	Stalled engine
DNF	Hope Bartlett	10	MG TA s/c	H. Bartlett	13:36	18	Broken push rods
DNF	Norman Tipping	17	Terraplane Six Special	N.G. Tipping	12:00	11	Broken gear lever
DNF	Ron Ward	28	MG TA	R.S. Ward	1:00	6	Retired at pits
DNF	Bill Conoulty	30	Austin 7 Comet s/c	W. Conoulty	0:00	6	Big end bolt failed
DNF	Frank Kleinig	1	Hudson Eight Special	F. Kleinig	22:02	5	Clutch failed
DNF	Ron Edgerton	7	Lycoming Special	R. Edgerton	14:30	4	Fuel trouble
DNF	Norman Andrews	20	Willys Jeep Monoposto	N.J.T. Andrews	9:00	4	Cylinder block split through overheating
DNF	Belf Jones	15	Buick Special	B.J. Jones	12:00	3	Retired
DNF	Ron Ewing	4	Buick Special	R.M. Ewing	19:00	1	Clutch failed
DNF	Bob Ledwidge	14	Terraplane Special	R.E Ledwidge	12:00	0	Broken fuel filter bowl
DNS	John Read	6	Alta Ford V8	E.J. Read	-	-	Differential failed in support race
DNS	Dick Bland	11	Ford V8 Special	R. Bland	-	-	Clutch failed in support race
DNS	Warwick Pratley	16	Ford V8 Special	F. W. Pratley	-	-	Big end failed in support race
DNS	Peter Vennermark	19	MG Q Type s/c	P. Vennermark	-	-	Non-acceptor
DNS	Ced James	24	MG NE Magnette	C.H. James	-	-	Brake adjustment failed in support race
DNS	W.T. Nunn	25	MG TB	W.T. Nunn	-	-	Car tired after winning support race
DNS	Len Golding	29	MG Magna	L. Golding	-	-	Water in cylinders

Note:

- NC = Not Classified
- DNF = Did Not Finish
- DNS = Did Not Start
- Handicap = gap between start time of car and start time of first starter
- Time = Actual running time of car, not including handicap

=== Notes ===
- Attendance: 27,000 (estimated)
- Race distance: 25 laps, 96.5 miles (155.4 km)
- Number of entries: 32
- Number of starters: 22
- Number of classified finishers: 7
- First driver to start: Bill Conoulty
- Last drivers to start: Frank Kleinig and John Crouch
- Fastest race time: Jack Murray (Bugatti Ford s/c), 1h 26m 24s
- Fastest lap: Frank Kleinig (Hudson Eight Special), 3m 20s
