= 1949 All Powers Long Handicap =

Layout of the Mount Panorama Circuit (1938-1986)

The 1949 All Powers Long Handicap was a motor race staged at the Mount Panorama Circuit near Bathurst in New South Wales, Australia on 18 April 1949. It was contested over 25 laps, a total distance of approximately 100 miles. The race utilised a handicap start with the last car commencing 18 minutes and 30 seconds after the first cars.

The race was won by Arthur Rizzo driving a Rizzo Riley.

== Results ==
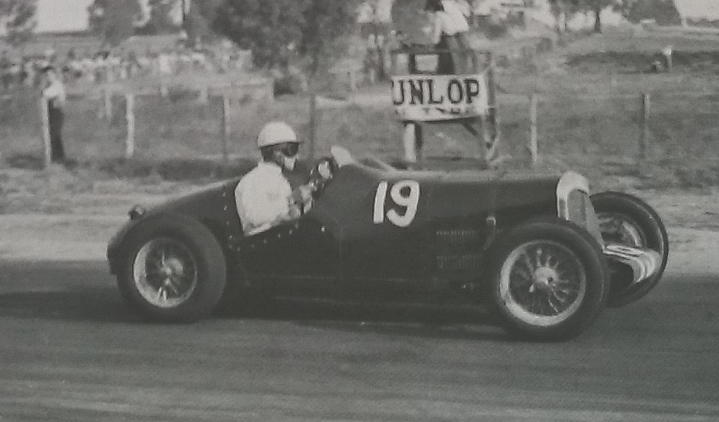
Arthur Rizzo won the race driving the Rizzo Riley

Position	Driver	No.	Car	Entrant	Handicap	Race time	Laps
1	Arthur Rizzo	19	Rizzo Riley	A Rizzo	14.00	92.16	25
2	AH Brydon	29	MG TC	AH Brydon	17.00	93.11	25
3	Frank Kleinig	2	Kleinig Hudson	F Kleinig	5.00	94.38	25
4	Ray Gordon	20	MG TC s/c	RS Gordon	14.00	94.39	25
5	Tony Gaze	21	HRG	FAO Gaze	14.00	94.43	25
6	Tommy Sulman	33	Sulman Singer	TN Sulman	17.00	94.52	25
7	Tony Mann	25	MG TC	HE Mann	16.00	95.16	25
8	Ken Coglan	27	MG TC	K Coglan	17.00	95.19	25
9	Ron Ward	26	MG TB	RS Ward	16.00	95.30	25
10	George Pearse	17	MG TB Special	GE Pearse	14.00	96.00	25
11	Garry Coglan	28	MG TC	G Coglan	17.00	96.07	25
NC	Irwin Luke	35	Bugatti Type 37	IC Luke	18.30		22
NC	George Thame	18	Riley	HG Thame	14.00		19
NC	Ken Tubman	34	MG N Magnette	F Elbourne	18.30		19
DNF	Dick Bland	7	G Reed Special	CR Bland	8.00		21
DNF	Bill MacLachlan	4	Mackellar V8 s/c (Bugatti Ford)	DA MacLaughlan	6.30		15
DNF	Peter Critchley	31	MG TB	EP Critchley	17.00		13
DNF	Jack Murray	5	Bugatti Ford (Day Special)	JE Murray	6.30		9
DNF	Ray Mansell	9	Mercury Special	CR Bland	10.00		7
DNF	Harry Monday	11	Mercury Special	HS Monday	10.00		7
DNF	Lex Davison	1	Alfa Romeo 2.9 s/c	AN Davison	0.00		7
DNF	Warwick Pratley	8	G Reed Special	FW Pratley	9.00		1
DNF	Wally Feltham	36	Waltham Special (MG Magna / Magnette)	WD Feltham	18.30		1

=== Notes ===
- Attendance: Over 20,000
- Race distance: 25 laps, 100 miles
- Race format: Handicap start
- Starters: 23
- Finishers: 11
- Fastest lap: Frank Kleinig, 3 min 7 secs (74.6 mph)
- Fastest time: Frank Kleinig, 1 hr 21 min 8 secs (71.6 mph)
- Luke, Thame & Tubman were flagged off at the expiration of the race time limit
