= Upper Castlereagh Public School =

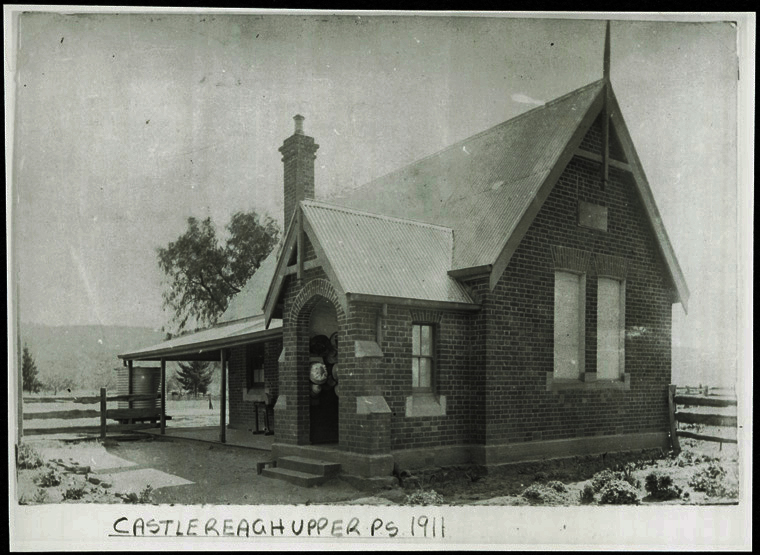
- Upper Castlereagh Public School building in 1911

- Location within Sydney Location within Australia
- 33°43′15″S 150°39′57″E
- Location: Castlereagh Road, Castlereagh, City of Penrith, New South Wales, Australia

History
- Built: 1878–1879
- Built for: Wesleyan Methodist Church of Australia

Site notes
- Architect: George Allen Mansfield
- Owner: Minister for Community Services

New South Wales Heritage Register
- Official name: Upper Castlereagh Public School and residence
- Type: State heritage (built)
- Designated: 2 April 1999
- Reference no.: 339
- Type: School - State (public)
- Category: Education
- Builders: James Evans

The Upper Castlereagh Public School is a heritage-listed former closed school building located at 312 Old Castlereagh Road in the western Sydney suburb of Castlereagh in the City of Penrith local government area of New South Wales, Australia. It was designed by George Allen Mansfield and built from 1878 to 1879 by James Evans. It is also known as Upper Castlereagh Public School and residence. The property is owned by New South Wales Minister for Community Services. It was added to the New South Wales State Heritage Register on 2 April 1999.

== History ==
The land on which the school building is sited was originally part of the 40-hectare (100-acre) of Portion 54, granted to Edward Field in 1803. This block was donated by the family for the purpose of building the school.

The school symbolises the basic decision of the State to provide public education for all children as distinct from Church connected education. School in the church hall opposite ceased forthwith and for just under 100 years this single room school was the centre of basic education for children at Upper Castlereagh.

James Rutledge arrived in Castlereagh in 1840, employed as a school teacher, but he was also a lay preacher. As these two activities needed to be provided in one building his first ambition was to build a church. The church on Old Castlereagh Road, which opened in 1847, remains the oldest Wesleyan church in Australia. For James and his wife Lucy (granddaughter of two convicts: they married in 1842) this church represented everything they held dear. James declared that to him, it "was hallowed ground". The Rutledge family was not Irish but had been in Ireland for 200 years. Before that they lived on the English-Scottish border giving allegiance to neither monarchy, but to their family name only. The Rutledges were devout Protestants. The descendants of three Rutledge brothers who moved to Ireland with Oliver Cromwell, driving Catholics from their farms (having had Cromwell sack Rutledge Castle in England), were deeply-religious Wesleyans. Ministers of the church were present in every generation. It was James Rutledge's intention to be an ordained Minister but this opportunity was lost when he left Ireland to come to New South Wales.

== Description ==
=== School/Chapel ===
A simple rectangular hall with attached side entry porch typical of rural public schools of the period. Gothic revival in form and detailing the building features steeply pitched gables with timber barge boards, braces and finials, together with simply stepped buttresses to the porch walls and Tudor arched entrance. Major finishes include face brickwork to walls, stone basecourse, sills and buttress dressings and contrasting rubbed brick heads to windows and entrance porch. The roof is corrugated iron sheeting. Windows are boarded over, the main entry door is timber, framed and sheeted. Out buildings associated with the main school building included the original brick privy.

=== Schoolmaster's residence ===
A simple Victorian painted brick cottage with hipped corrugated iron roofs to main structure and front verandah. Extant original windows are 2 x 6 pane double hung sashes. Chimneys to main residence and service wing feature simple corbelled brickwork tops and strings.

=== Condition ===
As at 23 July 2002, The physical condition of the school and residence is poor with problems such as rusting or roof iron, gutters and downpipes and deterioration of exposed timber elements and painted finishes:

1. Restored school to be used for community seminars - by school children and adults; and
2. Residence to be used by caretaker/guide for the heritage precinct on both sides of Castlereagh Road.

=== Modifications and dates ===
Boarded timber lean to added to school (south elevation) plus additional slated timber lean to at rear of house. Unsympathetic additions and original details in evidence.

=== Further information ===
The significance of the sites as representative of important early personages and social patterns in the Castlereagh area should be retained. This historical/social, cultural significance is, in large measure, associated with the site through verbal transfer of information and the evidence of documentary sources. Physical elements that represents aspects of this significance include site boundary demarcation elements (early fences and tree planting). Opposite the site are elements erected for a special social purpose of importance to the area as a whole (eg the original weatherboard school and its later replacement, the church, Castlereagh Road etc). The continuing use of a site for functions is a means of preserving its historical significance.

== Heritage listing ==
As at 25 January 2013, this group of items has strong associations at a state level with the beginnings of the Wesleyan movement in Australia, and the construction of the first Methodist Church in Australia. The development of the education system at the local level is represented by the education facilities. The establishment of the first Wesleyan chapel in Australia is a significant contribution to the historical development of the area, in association with the constribution of two early schools to cater to the valley population. The retention of part of the original layout of the Upper Castlereagh township, particularly as it related, and continues to relate, to Castlereagh Road at a local level adds to the significance of the place. This is a highly significant cultural landscape of state heritage significance (as a whole).

First school in the area conducted in Chapel opposite from 1840. Then transferred to public school 1878 under control of NSW Department of Education. School and cottage designed by G. A. Mansfield, one of the prominent architects of the 19th century. School is part of a heritage precinct located opposite.

Of local significance for its role in the education of many early residents. Local significance due to the association with the early development of this scattered rural community.

Upper Castlereagh Public School was listed on the New South Wales State Heritage Register on 2 April 1999 having satisfied the following criteria.

The place is important in demonstrating the course, or pattern, of cultural or natural history in New South Wales.

The school is a visible reminder of the decision to establish public schools in the nineteenth century. It is a sample of Mansfield's work at the same time he was planning Prince Alfred Hospital. Together with the Chapel, Hall and Cemetery, the School forms an historic heritage precinct.

The place is important in demonstrating aesthetic characteristics and/or a high degree of creative or technical achievement in New South Wales.

Constructed of brick with a steep corrugated iron gabled roof, the school room and brick residence are features of the development of this rural community. They form a part of the early Church/School precinct at Upper Castlereagh. The sites are aesthetically pleasing and harmonious in their immediate physical settings and for the aesthetic character of individual grouped elements viewed from within the sites.

The place has a strong or special association with a particular community or cultural group in New South Wales for social, cultural or spiritual reasons.

In conjunction with the 19th century Chapel, Hall and Cemetery opposite, this is now classed as a "heritage precinct". As a contemporary community by using residential Academy opposite for educational purposes: spiritual purposes and social purposes there will be a continuous flow of people.

The place has potential to yield information that will contribute to an understanding of the cultural or natural history of New South Wales.

Taking stages of growth in Australian history could be the subject of on site residential classes of school children examining the story or European settlement and Aborigines: new settler phase (1806 - 1867), small holdings and subdivision (1867 - 1950), present phase (1950 - 2000) travel and recreation.

The place possesses uncommon, rare or endangered aspects of the cultural or natural history of New South Wales.

1. Historical - Church and State division symbolised by two separate buildings.
2. Cultural - Symbol of interrelationship of school, Chapel and Cemetery 125 years ago.

The place is important in demonstrating the principal characteristics of a class of cultural or natural places/environments in New South Wales.

1. Life in the "interior" of a convict colony
2. Grants to ticket of leave - for convict settlers along the river
3. Opposite site connects first gift to Australian Methodists by ex Rum Corps Soldier 18
4. 50% Convicts and Ticket-of-Leave persons associated with present Chapel (1847).

== See also ==
- Former schools in New South Wales
