= Western Sydney Lakes =

Lake and artificial beach in New South Wales, Australia

Coordinates: 33.707792°S 150.675453°E

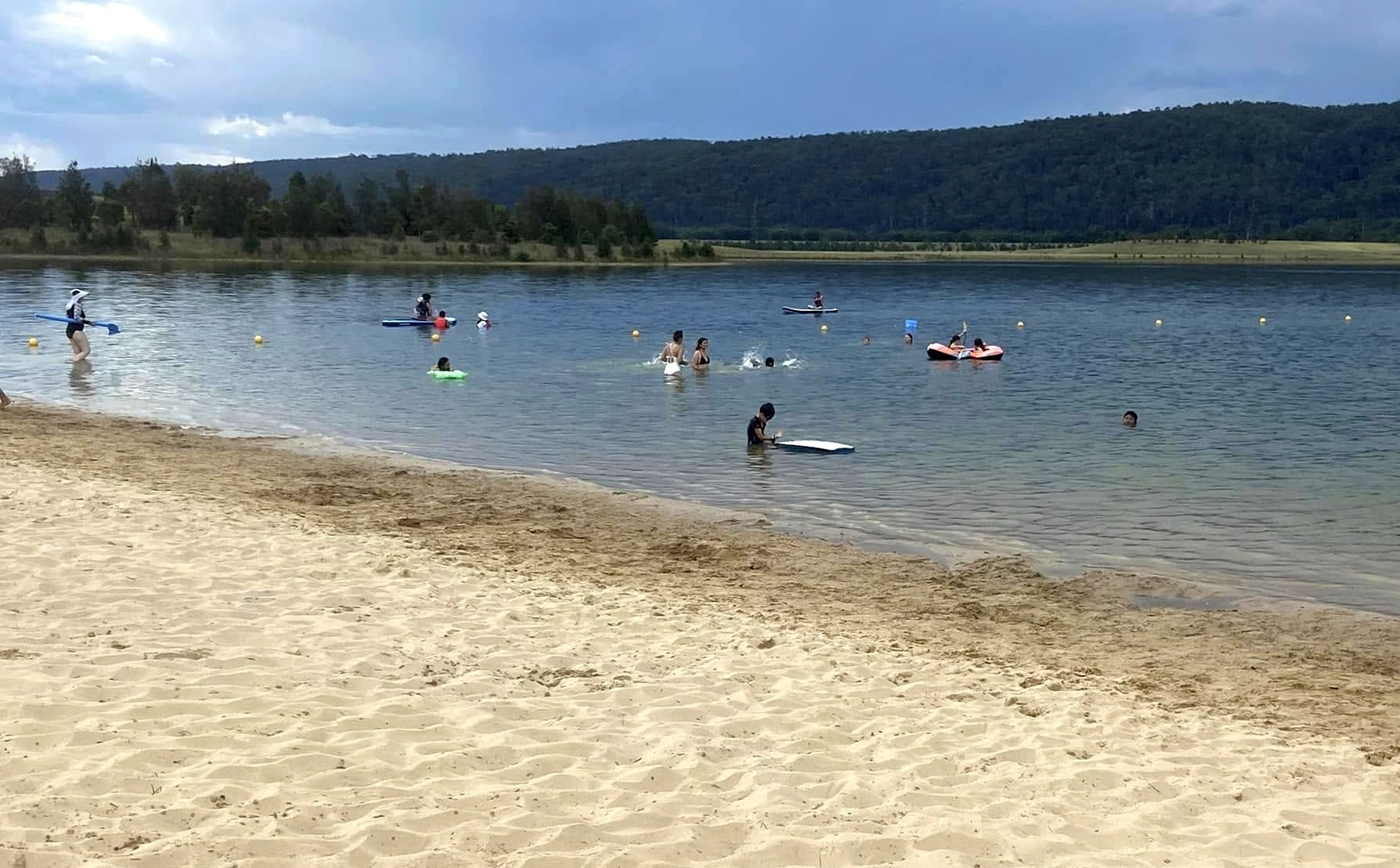
Pondi Beach or Penrith Beach, a swimming spot, overlooking the Blue Mountains.

Western Sydney Lakes is an area in the suburb of Castlereagh near Penrith in Western Sydney, New South Wales, Australia. It was previously known as the Penrith Lakes until 2022. It features lakes and parklands as well as recreational facilities. The lakes contain Penrith Beach, nicknamed Pondi by the locals, which is an artificial inland beach.

The area also contains the Sydney International Regatta Centre which was one of the first parts of the Penrith Lakes Scheme to be completed.

== Description ==
The lakes themselves are a series of 12 man-made quarries from which coarse sand and gravel has been mined since the 1880s, with large-scale mining operations occurring since the 1950s. Penrith Lakes was the largest sand and gravel quarry in Australia until the discontinuation of mining activities in 2015.

Penrith Lakes is managed by the Penrith Lakes Development Corporation (PLDC) which was formed in 1980 by the three companies that operated quarries in the area that joined together and combined their land. They planned to rehabilitate the land that was quarried so it could be used for recreational purposes with the Penrith Lakes Scheme.

== Pondi Beach ==
Also known as "Bondi of the West", Pondi Beach was first opened to public in December 2023, where it features over 700 carparking spaces. Rivaling the size of Sydney Harbour, the beach was constructed on a rectified quarry on private land north of Penrith, adjacent to the Nepean River, as an answer to the region's heatwaves.

Sand was brought in to create a beach similar in length to Bondi and about 35 metres wide. The water is just slightly warmer than the ocean, reaching 24 °C (75 °F) at the height of summer. The 130 metres (430 ft) expanse of the beach is patrolled by lifeguards, and the selected swimming area extends 80 metres (260 ft) out, with parts up to 5.0 metres (16.4 ft) deep. Moreover, the name Pondi is a portmanteau of "Bondi" and "Penrith".
