= Castlereagh, New South Wales =

Castlereagh
- Suburb
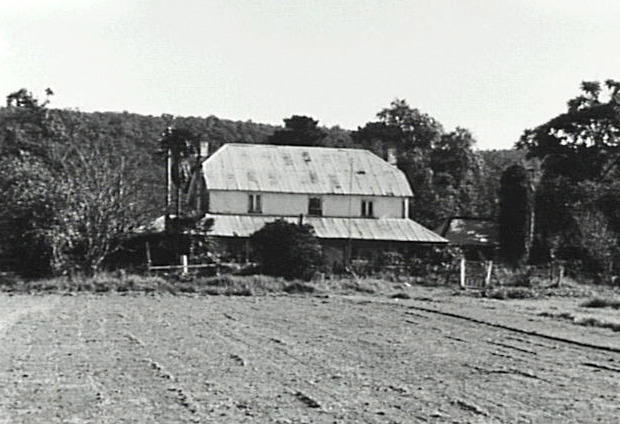
- Hadley Park, c. 1810

- Interactive map of Castlereagh
- Coordinates: 33°40′19″S 150°40′42″E
- Country: Australia
- State: New South Wales
- City: Sydney
- LGA: City of Penrith
- Location: 67 km (42 mi) north-west of Sydney CBD
- Established: 1810

Government
  - State electorates: Londonderry; Penrith
  - Federal division: Lindsay
- Elevation: 31 m (102 ft)

Population
  - Total: 1,248 (2021 census)
- Postcode: 2749
Suburbs around Castlereagh
Yarramundi	Agnes Banks	Londonderry
Yellow Rock	Castlereagh	Cranebrook
Emu Heights	Penrith	Penrith

Castlereagh is a suburb of Sydney, in the state of New South Wales, Australia. Castlereagh is 67 kilometres (42 mi) north-west of the Sydney central business district, in the local government area of the City of Penrith and is part of the Greater Western Sydney region.

== History ==
The suburb is one of the most historic sites in Australia's colonial history, being one of the five Macquarie towns officially proclaimed on 6 December 1810. Governor Lachlan Macquarie recorded the following in his journal "the Township for the Evan or Nepean District I have named Castlereagh in honor (sic) of Lord Viscount Castlereagh", Secretary of State for War and the Colonies 1805–1806. He, in turn, was named after Castlereagh in Northern Ireland. The official Government and General Order issued from Government House, Sydney was dated 15 December 1810.

The earliest known European development was the building of Hadley Park, between what is now Castlereagh Road and the Nepean River. Charles Hadley was given a grant in 1803, and his house, Hadley Park, was built c. 1806. It still stands, largely intact. It has been said that it is difficult to overestimate the significance of this building. It was one of the earliest buildings in the colony and is "probably unique in its condition and setting". The property is listed on the New South Wales State Heritage Register.

Nepean Park, c. 1822, is also situated on Castlereagh Road, and was built by convict labour for John Single. A notable two-storey farmhouse in the Georgian style, it was acquired by the Dixon family in 1934. It is listed on the (now defunct) Register of the National Estate and the NSW State Heritage Register.

Castlereagh Post Office opened on 1 April 1857 and closed in 1967.

After two hundred years, the rich river flats still provide for a thriving agricultural industry along the Nepean River. Many of Penrith district's pioneering families had originated from Castlereagh. The suburb's historical importance is reflected in its many surviving farmhouses, outbuildings, churches and cemeteries.

== Heritage listings ==
Castlereagh has a number of heritage-listed sites, including:

- Castlereagh Road: Upper Castlereagh Public School
- 14-278 Old Castlereagh Road: Hadley Park

== Demographics ==
According to the 2021 census, there were 1,248 residents in Castlereagh. 81.7% of people were born in Australia and 86.5% of people only spoke English at home. The most common responses for religion were Catholic 40.6%, No Religion 27.7% and Anglican 13.2%.

== Transport ==
Castlereagh Road is one of the important transport links in Sydney connecting the Hawkesbury and Penrith regions.

== Schools ==
The area has historic public school buildings, the Upper Castlereagh Public School and residence. Situated on Castlereagh Road, superseding a Wesleyan schoolhouse on the opposite side of the road, this was designed by G. A. Mansfield and constructed by James Evans, 1878-1879.

There is also a K-12 parent-controlled Christian school, The Lakes Christian College. There is also a K-6 Principal controlled Primary school, Lower Castlereagh Public School, now known as Castlereagh Public School.

== Sport ==
Nepean Speedway (38°38′45″S 150°41′15″E) is a motorcycle speedway venue approximately 3 kilometres north of the suburb, off Rickards Road. The venue, which has a 390m track has hosted important motorcycle speedway events, including qualifying rounds of the Speedway World Championship (starting in 1992) and the final of the New South Wales Individual Speedway Championship on two occasions.
