= Wilberforce =

Wilberforce may refer to:

== People ==
- Wilberforce (name), for people (and fictional characters) with the name
  - William Wilberforce (1759–1833), British politician, evangelical reformer and campaigner against the slave trade

== Places ==
=== Australia ===
- Wilberforce, New South Wales
  - Wilberforce Cemetery
  - Wilberforce Park

=== Canada ===
- Wilberforce, Ontario
- Wilberforce Colony, Ontario; an 18th-century colony of American Black citizens
- Kattimannap Qurlua (formerly Wilberforce Falls), in Wilberforce Gorge, Nunavut
- North Algona Wilberforce, a township in Renfrew County, Ontario; formed from North Algona and Wilberforce Townships

=== United Kingdom ===
- Wilberforce House, the birthplace of William Wilberforce, in Hull, England
- Wilberforce Way, a walking route between Hull and York, England
- Wilberfoss, East Riding of Yorkshire, England
- Wilberforce Oak, a tree stump near Holwood House, Keston, England

=== Other ===
- Wilberforce, Ohio, United States
- Wilberforce, Sierra Leone
- Wilberforce River, in the Southern Alps of New Zealand

== Education ==
- Wilberforce Institute, research institute at the University of Hull, England
- Wilberforce School, in Princeton Junction, New Jersey
- Wilberforce University, in Wilberforce, Ohio
- Central State University, a public, historically black university in Wilberforce, Ohio (formerly Wilberforce State University)

== Other uses ==
- Wilberforce (cat), who lived at 10 Downing Street between 1973 and 1987
- Wilberforce pendulum

== See also ==
- Wilbur Force, a character in The Little Shop of Horrors
- Paterson Wilberforce, a U.S. soccer team which played in the National Association Football League in the early 20th century
- Wilberforce Award, given by Ratanak International to people who fight human trafficking
- The Wilberforce Society, an independent, non-partisan, student think tank at Cambridge University
- William Wilberforce Trafficking Victims Protection Reauthorization Act of 2008, a federal statute by the U.S. Congress
