= Wilberforce Park =

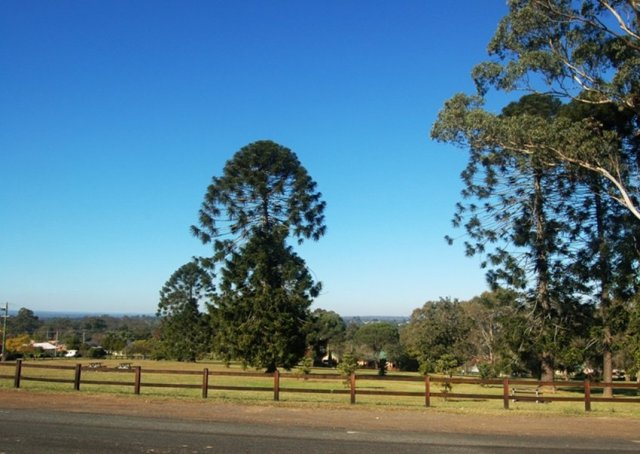
- Vista over Wilberforce Park looking Southeast from Macquarie Road

- Location within New South Wales Location within Australia
- 33.5565°S 150.8447°E
- Location: 47 George Road, Wilberforce, City of Hawkesbury, New South Wales, Australia

History
- Built: 1810–

Site notes
- Architect(s): Governor Macquarie (Designer 1810); James Meehan (Surveyor 1811)

New South Wales Heritage Register
- Official name: Wilberforce Park; Great Square; Wilberforce; Reserved Square; Recreation Ground; Wilberforce
- Type: state heritage (landscape)
- Designated: 18 November 2011
- Reference no.: 1868
- Type: Urban Park
- Category: Parks, Gardens and Trees

Wilberforce Park is a heritage-listed public parkland at 47 George Road, Wilberforce, City of Hawkesbury, New South Wales, Australia. It was first established in 1810 by Governor Lachlan Macquarie and surveyed by James Meehan in 1811. It is also known as Great Square, Reserved Square and the Recreation Ground. It was added to the New South Wales State Heritage Register on 18 November 2011.

== History ==
The town of Wilberforce lies immediately above the rich alluvial flood plain of the Upper Hawkesbury River. The natural food resources, both animal and vegetable, afforded by the soil and the water, had been attractive to Aboriginal people for millennia before European settlement in 1794 and subsequent years transformed the plain into intensive farms. The area available for land grants along what became known as Wilberforce Reach was constrained in 1804 by the creation of Phillip Common by Governor King. This well-wooded upland area of 6150 acres (2600 hectares) was available as rough grazing for the farmers on the cleared agricultural land beside the river.

When Governor Macquarie arrived in the colony in 1810, he was aware of the problems created by the propensity of the Hawkesbury to rise rapidly in flood and inundate the low-lying farms. By December 1810, the Governor was ready to implement a plan to create five new towns on higher ground along the Upper Hawkesbury and Lower Nepean, where allotments would be reserved for those farming on the plain, so that they might have a secure refuge for themselves, their families, their seed-corn and animals in time of flood. In all four Hawkesbury towns, Richmond, Windsor, Pitt Town and Wilberforce, the initial site was largely or wholly resumed from King's Commons.

Wilberforce is the only one of the five towns sited on the inland side of the river. The river frontage along Wilberforce Reach, close to the future town, had been fully occupied by the end of 1794 and the area along the north-eastern part of York Reach was being farmed by 1795. In Macquarie's time the greatest density of settlement on the inland side still lay to the south-west of the town, in the boot-shaped area within the great bend of the river along the Argyle, Windsor and Wilberforce Reaches. The site chosen for the town on 6 December 1810 was convenient for access to the river and its farms. Except for King Road, closest to the plain, it lay above the level of any anticipated flood. The elevated situation, however, paid the price of a steady slope. Geographers have assigned five types of slope to the parish of Wilberforce, varying from the level flood-plain along the river, through level uplands and "rolling" country to "rough" and "steep". The level uplands lie too far from the river farms to be a possible site for the town, but the penalty of being closer to the flood-plain was that most of the town was built on a slope of the second steepest category. No other Macquarie town is built on such a pronounced hillside.

The surveyor, James Meehan started his work of laying out Wilberforce on 5 January 1811 in a perfect symmetry of three rows, each containing five sections. The Great Square occupied the whole central rectangular section. When Governor Macquarie returned to the town on 11 January 1811, "the name (Wilberforce) being painted on a board was nailed on a high post and erected in the middle of the large square in presence of a great number of the most respectable settlers in this district".

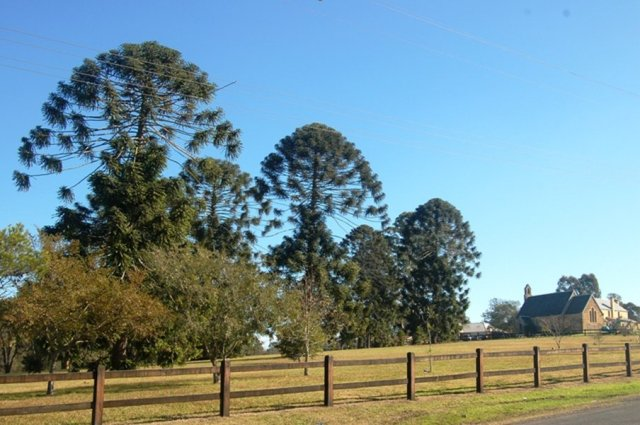
View over Wilberforce Park from Church Road, looking north west to bunyas, St John's Anglican Church and the Macquarie schoolhouse-church

The Square was defined by the new town streets, Macquarie to the north, George to the south and, on the short sides of the rectangle, Duke to the west and Church to the east. These new roads did not supersede the older track from the flood-plain up to the road to Kurrajong, which wound across the eastern sector of the new Square. Houses were built which encroached on George Road opposite the Square and the schoolmaster's house of the 1830s came very close to encroaching on the Square itself. Church Road had no building development at all until the very end of the nineteenth century, but the two allotments in Duke Road adjacent to the Square had been developed. On the land above the Square across Macquarie Road, the second Macquarie schoolhouse/chapel, built in 1819, dominated the scene until Edmund Blacket erected St John's Anglican Church in front of the Macquarie building in 1860. Bishop William Broughton had in 1849 attempted to have the proposed new church built in the middle of the Square instead, and he had some local support, but this development was not approved.

Wilberforce Square, in contrast to Richmond Park, was not designated as a market place. The pronounced slope made it unsuitable for team-games, such as cricket, which were regularly played in the Squares at both Richmond and Windsor (McQuade Park). There was no authority responsible for the development of Wilberforce Square before 1895 and as a result there is little documentation about its first 85 years. Since the Square is unlikely to have been fenced in the nineteenth century, it is likely that cattle, sheep, horses and pigs would often have grazed there, en route to the common beyond Wilberforce Cemetery. Fencing did not entirely preclude grazing, for horses were agisted in the Square as late as the 1940s.

On 14 June 1895 Macquarie's Great Square was reclassified as a Recreation Ground. The new survey determined its area as 8 acres 3 rods 26 perches, very close to the present official extent of 3.607 hectares. The area remained Crown land and the Department of Lands, as was usual, appointed a group of Trustees to oversee its administration. Four local worthies were appointed as Trustees on 22 October 1895. Stephen John Dunstan and Reuben Greentree were members of old farming dynasties in the district, Lewis Simpson was the local tanner and George Nicholls another local farmer. In November 1895, these four Trustees were joined by a fifth, Edward Thomas Bowd, the third generation of his family in Wilberforce and the grandfather of the well-known local historian, Doug Bowd.

The area around Wilberforce had no provision for a local government authority until the Shires Act was passed in 1906. The five members of the Provisional Council of Colo Shire, including two of the Trustees, Dunstan and Bowd, met for the first time on 13 June 1906 and Bowd became one of the six elected members of the Council in December of that year.

Colo Shire Council met in Wilberforce, but it was responsible for a rural area of 3,200 square kilometres with a scattered population of around 4,000 in 1910. Its main preoccupations were road and ferry maintenance and for more than three decades it took no role in running the Recreation Reserve. The Trustees, who had been appointed for life, continued to function. In 1918, when there was an impulse to erect a War Memorial, the chair of the local Patriotic League was E. T. Bowd, while another Trustee, Greentree, was prominent on the committee. The Memorial was erected, however, not in the Recreation Reserve but on the elbow of King Road. When Reuben Greentree died in 1923, the Department of Lands appointed a replacement, F. R. Daly, the Wilberforce storekeeper, after consulting with the Colo Council.

No minutes of the Trustees' meetings are known to survive and it is not possible to know what policies they implemented about the development of the Recreation Reserve. The single-rail wooden fence which appears in a photograph of 1937 was presumably erected by the Trustees, but there is no information about clearing or planting the reserve. In 1946, however, the Colo Shire Council took the initiative and called a public meeting for 28 August 1946 to allow the community to discuss improving what was now called a park for "sports and recreation" or alternatively to approve the disposal of the land and seek a new playing field on a more level site. At the August meeting the local people showed a reluctance to part with the Macquarie Square and instead formed a Citizens' Committee to draw up a Master Plan to decide "the most suitable area for a park, recreation area and swimming pool to meet the needs of the future". Concessions to those interested in sport and in war memorials immediately followed early in 1947.

An area in the centre of the Park was cleared and levelled for use a practice nets for cricket. This terrace is visible in a 1947 aerial photograph. So is a tennis court in the south-west of the Park, near George Road. The court was made from ant heaps and a rectangular changing shed was built just to the north for the tennis players by day and used by a swagman by night.

The tennis courts and the cricket nets were removed around the 1980s by Hawkesbury City Council, the successor to Colo Shire Council. Toilets built just east of the tennis court site in 1994 were removed in 1999 because of extreme vandalism. The provision of sporting facilities has continued to be an issue and a thrust for the building of a mini-basketball court near the Duke Road frontage was seriously considered in 2003 before it was rejected.

The Park has been seen as a secure place for children to enjoy and the need for play equipment has been recognised. The playground was removed briefly in 1999 and has now been replaced in the south-west sector with new facilities. Close by, between the play equipment and George Road, a public barbecue was provided by the City Council, within a shelter shed.

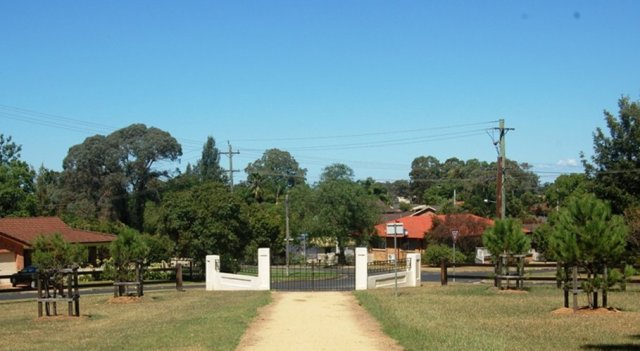
Memorial gates

Australia's enthusiasm for the memorialisation of war has been very evident in the Park since the end of World War II. On 19 August 1947, the President of the Shire Council unveiled memorial gates in the Park on the corner of Duke and George Roads. These gates were "in honour of the men and women of the Wilberforce District who served in the cause of freedom in World War II, 1939–1945". The gates were at the entrance to an existing transverse pathway which led up to Macquarie Road directly opposite the Blacket church of St John. The trees which line this avenue are now mature and more were planted by Council in 1995 at the urging of the RSL for the jubilee celebrations called Australia Remembers 1945. More trees were planted as part of the district's Bicentennial program in 1994, when old Hawkesbury families were each commemorated by a tree and an appropriate plaque on a small concrete plinth. A few of these Bicentennial trees and plaques survive in the north-east corner of Wilberforce Park and four on the western side of the pathway. Nine young trees have recently been planted on the pathway at the George Road end.

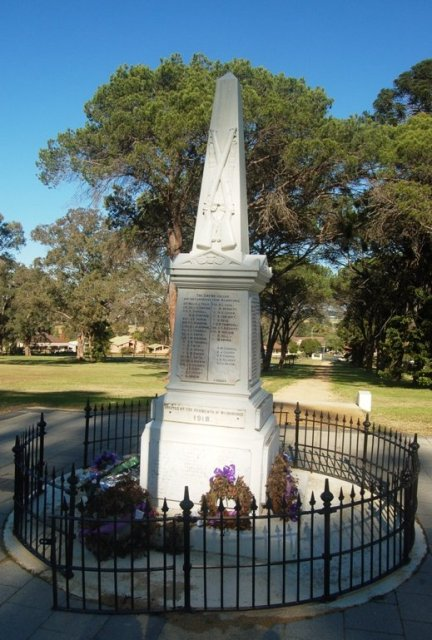
Wilberforce War Memorial

A World War I Memorial was erected in 1918 by the Lidcombe contractors Kingsley and Cook in David Street, just outside the Macquarie town boundaries. In 1966 the Colo Shire Engineer, Stan Brown, supervised the transfer of the monument intact on a float. It was resited, together with its circular cast-iron fence, near the top of the diagonal pathway, and at right angles to it, so that it has a spatial relationship with the 1947 Memorial Gates at the foot of the avenue. The text on the original marble plaque on the Memorial referring only to World War I had already been expanded to include World War II while the Memorial was still in David Street. Names of people who served in the Korean War (1950–1953) and the Vietnam War (1965–1972) were added after the memorial was relocated in the Park. The names of those who served in these later conflicts were added on new plaques low down on the sandstone base.

A corollary to these physical changes has been that ANZAC Day rituals have since 1966 concentrated on the Park. The Country Women's Association has provided morning tea each 25 April, while Council has supplied portable chairs for those attending the ceremony.

The community values the Park as a place for passive recreation. When the Council proposed to build a new Community Centre and pre-school in the Park in 1991, there was a very sharp reaction, which resulted in the refurbishment of the old Community Hall on Windsor Road and the dropping of all plans to disrupt the recreational space of the Park. As a result, Wilberforce Park, alone among the Macquarie Squares, has retained its full spatial integrity and withstood the temptations to create any substantial structures within the Park. This is truly a Reserved Square.

Today, unlike the two other Macquarie-period Hawkesbury Great Squares on the State Heritage Register (at Windsor and Richmond), Wilberforce retains with precision the dimensions, location, purpose and context envisaged by Governor Macquarie. By contrast, at Windsor McQuade Park has been greatly increased in size and at Richmond a portion of the Square has been resumed for law and order purposes and for postal communications, while both Squares have extensive commitments to sport. Wilberforce has a different level and style of historical integrity, with an outstanding legibility which is of State importance.

== Description ==
Wilberforce Park is a rectangular area of well-treed grassland containing 3.607 hectares. The land slopes downwards between the two longer sides: the highest point is on Macquarie Road, the lowest on the corner of George and Duke Roads. There has been some artificial levelling in the central portion of the park.

There are various benches cut into the sloping ground marking areas of former structures (tennis court and shed), playground and practice cricket pitch/nets. In 2003 a small shelter pavilion with a barbecue was constructed and replacement play equipment has recently been installed nearby in the south-west sector of the Park.

The planting at Wilberforce Park is distinctive. Lines of pines (most likely stone pines, Pinus pinea) and bunya pines (Araucaria bidwillii), were planted to form two avenues in the park. A comparison of the 1947 aerial photograph indicate that some plantings on the eastern avenue have since been removed. The park contains mature indigenous eucalypts. One specimen opposite the gate of St John's Church on Macquarie Road marked the junction of the lines of two paths from the southern corners of the park.

Despite the loss of numerous early plantings there remains a substantial and impressive collection of conifers and old Red Gums (Eucalyptus tereticornis). Some of these require attention from an arborist to assess their viability and safety. There is root damage near the surface to some trees due to inappropriate mowing regimes.

The Park is surrounded by a modern two-rail wooden fence, erected in accordance with the recommendation of the Conservation Management Plan of 2003. A single pathway cuts diagonally across the Park from Macquarie Road opposite St John's Anglican Church down to the junction of George and Duke Roads, where there are metal gates erected in 1947 in memory of those local men and women who had served in World War II. Towards the northern end of this pathway there is the World War I Memorial, originally erected elsewhere in the town in 1918 and reconstructed within the Park in 1966.

This War Memorial is a complex structure some 4 metres high. The sandstone base, with two steps, stands on brick foundations. Above the base there are four rectangular marble tablets bearing the inscriptions "Wilberforce", "Freemans Reach", "Ebenezer" and "Erected by the Residents of Wilberforce". Above the tablets is a dye displaying four more marble panels. Three of these give the names of the World War I soldiers: "The Empire called and they answered" from Wilberforce, Ebenezer and Freemans Reach respectively. The fourth panel describes the purpose of the monument The dye is in turn surmounted by a pedimented cap, with carvings on all four sides, showing a bugle, an anchor, bayonets and a soldier's cap with the British and Australian flags. Finally there is a sandstone spire 2 metres high, with a large carving of two Lee-Enfield rifles on the northern side. The plaques on the sandstone base are later additions, listing those who served in World War II, Korea and Vietnam. The Memorial is surrounded by its original circular iron railing.

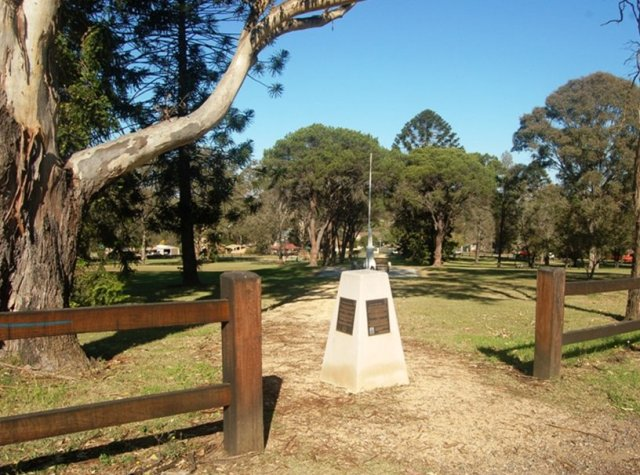
2008 concrete obelisk

At the north end of the pathway a concrete marker was installed in 2008 bearing three bronze plaques giving information about the history and significance of the park.

Close to the southern end of the pathway, there is a children's playground with some unobtrusive equipment.

The park retains intact the dimensions surveyed by James Meehan in 1811 and still fulfils the central role envisaged by Governor Macquarie in 1810. This is the best preserved of all the squares which were a fundamental feature of Macquarie's plans for new country towns.

== Heritage listing ==
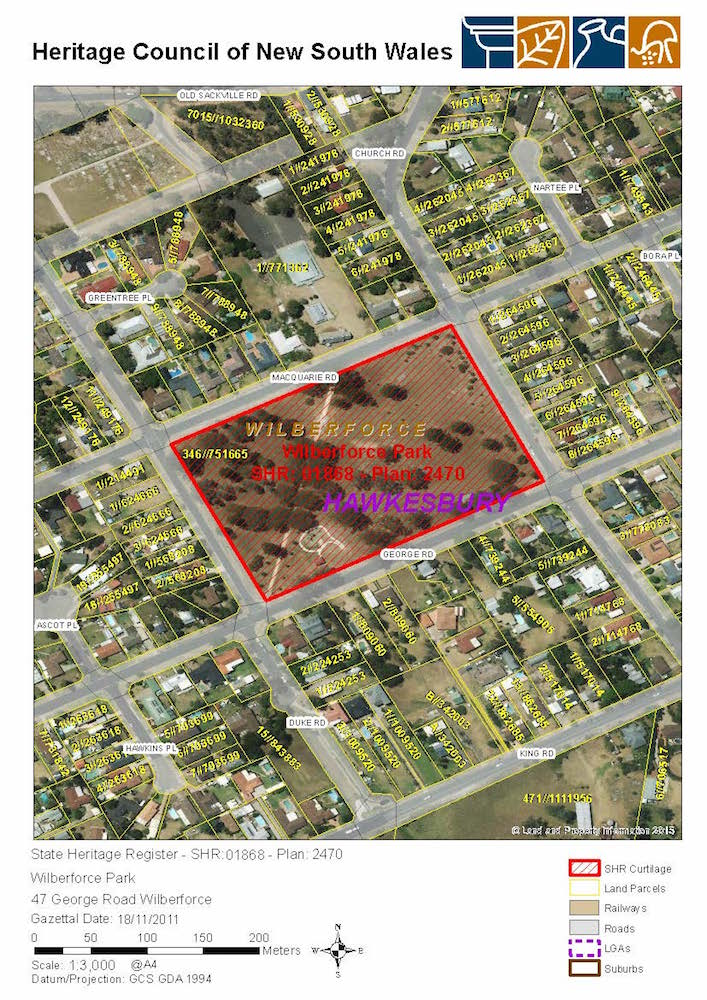
Heritage boundaries

Wilberforce Park is of State heritage significance as the best surviving example of the three surviving Great Squares created 200 years ago in the heart of the grid patterned towns of Wilberforce, Windsor and Richmond. Wilberforce is among the five new country towns planned by Governor Macquarie in 1810–1811 and has survived with remarkable integrity. Its direct associations with some of the earliest planning work by Governor Macquarie and James Meehan demonstrate its importance, together with Wilberforce as some of the earliest town planning attempts in NSW and the colony.

The central Square, now a Park, is still today an essential historic asset for passive recreation and quiet contemplation at the heart of a perfectly preserved Georgian town-plan. Its deliberate siting adjacent to the iconic Macquarie Schoolhouse/chapel and St John's (Blacket) Church (already on the State Heritage Register) and its views over the Hawkesbury flood-plain enhance the State significance of both Park and Schoolhouse.

The Park has also become the chosen site for the district's memorials to those who fell or otherwise served in war. The memorial erected after World War I and reused to commemorate subsequent campaigns, is of local significance not only for itself, but also for the way in which it has encouraged continuing planting of shade-trees in a memorial avenue.

Wilberforce Park was listed on the New South Wales State Heritage Register on 18 November 2011 having satisfied the following criteria.

The place is important in demonstrating the course, or pattern, of cultural or natural history in New South Wales.

Wilberforce Park is of State historical significance as a powerful testimony to the first stage of formal town planning in New South Wales. The rectangle of open green space in the centre of Governor Macquarie's most intact Hawkesbury town has survived for 200 years with remarkable integrity. It is still today an essential historic asset for passive recreation and quiet contemplation at the heart of a perfectly preserved Georgian town plan. Its deliberate siting adjacent to the iconic Macquarie schoolhouse/chapel and church, and its views over the Hawkesbury flood plain enhance the State significance of both park and schoolhouse.

Unlike the two other Macquarie-period Hawkesbury Great Squares at Windsor and Richmond, Wilberforce retains with precision the dimensions, location, purpose and context envisaged by Governor Macquarie. By contrast, at Windsor McQuade Park has been greatly increased in size and at Richmond a portion of the Square has been resumed for law and order purposes and for postal communications, while both Squares have extensive commitments to sport. Wilberforce has a different level and style of historical integrity, with an outstanding legibility which is of State importance.

The Park has also become the chosen site for the district's memorials to those who fell or otherwise served in external wars. The memorial erected after World War I and reused to commemorate subsequent campaigns, is of local significance, not only for itself but for the way in which it has encouraged continuing planting of shade trees in a memorial avenue.

The place has a strong or special association with a person, or group of persons, of importance of cultural or natural history of New South Wales's history.

Wilberforce Park has State significant associations because of its direct association with Governor Macquarie who in 1810, personally selected the location of the new town within Phillip Common. He also approved the placement within the town of the Anglican schoolhouse/church, the burial ground and the adjacent Great Square. The survey of the simple rectangular town, with the central feature of the Square, was done to the Governor's instructions and inspected by Macquarie soon after James Meehan had completed his initial work early in January 1811.

James Meehan was a hard-working and trusted surveyor whose work throughout the Macquarie period was significant in aiding Governor Macquarie's vision for the young colony. In the case of Wilberforce, Meehan's exemplary field-book survives to show him at work creating a new town in January 1811.

The place is important in demonstrating aesthetic characteristics and/or a high degree of creative or technical achievement in New South Wales.

Wilberforce Park has State significance as the essential counterpart for the State listed Macquarie schoolhouse/church and cemetery. The Park is as important a part of the view from the churches as they are of the view westwards from the Park. Wilberforce Park has aesthetic local significance because the Park as a whole, with its extensive tree plantings and wide vistas over the flood-plain which made the town of Wilberforce necessary, is an attractive and necessary adornment to the town. It is an essential breathing space within what has become a modern dormitory suburb within the Macquarie grid-plan. Wilberforce Park sums up the quiet aesthetic qualities which still make the Upper Hawkesbury valley a remarkable colonial scene.

The place has strong or special association with a particular community or cultural group in New South Wales for social, cultural or spiritual reasons.

Wilberforce Park has local social significance because the people of the Wilberforce district have strenuously lobbied to preserve the tranquil qualities of the Park from invasive works designed to create sporting facilities out of a natural slope or to introduce uncongenial buildings, while at the same time recognising that the memorialisation of war service can add to the public value of the place and make it a focal community spot each ANZAC Day.

The place possesses uncommon, rare or endangered aspects of the cultural or natural history of New South Wales.

Wilberforce Park has State rarity significance because it is the best preserved of the three Macquarie town squares which survive and fulfil their original function in the Hawkesbury towns founded and planned by Governor Macquarie in 1810–1811. The degree of integrity displayed by Wilberforce Park is unique among all Macquarie towns.

The place is important in demonstrating the principal characteristics of a class of cultural or natural places/environments in New South Wales.

Wilberforce Park has State representative significance because it is a prime example of the quiet fulfilment of one of the essential characteristics of Governor Macquarie's designs for the first country towns in Australia.
