= Wilberforce (name) =

Wilberforce is a name, both a surname and a given name. It is also the name of an English family, including William Wilberforce. Notable people with the name include:

== People ==
=== Surname ===
- Wilberforce (surname)

=== Given name ===
People with the given name include:

- Wilberforce Eames (1855–1937), American bibliographer and librarian
- Wilberforce Eaves (1867–1920), Australian-born tennis player from the United Kingdom
- Wilberforce Echezona (1926–1987), Nigerian musicologist and teacher
- Wilberforce Juta (1944–2020), Nigerian politician
- Wilberforce Kityo Luwalira (born 1958), Ugandan Anglican bishop
- Wilberforce Mfum (1936–2025), Ghanaian footballer
- Wilberforce Kisamba Mugerwa (1945–2021), Ugandan agricultural economist, politician and academic
- Wilberforce Ocran (born 1999), Ghanaian professional footballer in the United Kingdom
- Wilberforce Oundo, Kenyan politician
- Wilberforce Talel (born 1980), Kenyan runner

=== Middle name ===
People with the middle name include:

- A. Wilberforce Williams (1865–1940), African American physician, teacher, and journalist.
- Ronald Wilberforce Allen (1889–1936), English lawyer and Liberal politician
- Samuel Wilberforce Awuku-Darko (1924–?), Ghanaian accountant and politician
- Vincent Wilberforce Baddeley (1874–1961), British civil servant
- William Wilberforce Bird (merchant) (1758–1836), British merchant, civil servant and author; Member of Parliament for Coventry
  - William Wilberforce Bird (governor) (1784–1857), his son; British colonial administrator, Deputy Governor of Bengal, and Governor-General of India
- Edwin Wilberforce Carrington, Tobagonian diplomat; former Secretary-General of the Caribbean Community
- Henry Wilberforce Clarke (1840–1905), British translator of Persian works
- Charles Wilberforce Daniels (1862–1927), British physician
- William Gabula (William Wilberforce Gabula Nadiope IV; born 1988), the reigning Kyabazinga of Busoga, a constitutional kingdom in modern-day Uganda
- William Wilberforce Harris Greathed (1826–1878), British senior officer in the Bengal Engineers
- Francis Wilberforce Joaque (1845–1895), Sierra Leonean photographer
- Arthur Wilberforce Jose (1863–1934), English-Australian historian and editor
- George Wilberforce Kakoma (1923–2012), Ugandan musician who wrote Uganda's national anthem
- James Wilberforce Longley (1849–1922), Canadian journalist, lawyer, politician, and judge
- William Wilberforce Newton (1843–1914), American Episcopalian divine and author
- Harold Wilberforce Hindmarsh Stephen (1841–1889), Australian politician
- James Wilberforce Stephen (1822–1881), Australian politician

== Fictional characters ==
- Mr. Wilberforce Clayborne Humphries, a character in the 1970s British sitcom Are You Being Served?
- Mr. Wilberforce, a character in the children's novel, Under the Mountain, by Maurice Gee
- The Wilberforces, antagonists in the New Zealand children's TV horror-sci-fi show Under the Mountain, based on the novel by Maurice Gee
- Mrs. Louisa Wilberforce, one of the main characters in the film The Ladykillers
- Wilberforce Thornapple, a character in the comic strip The Born Loser
- Mayor Wilberforce Cranklepot, a character in Blinky Bill the Movie and The Wild Adventures of Blinky Bill
- Bertie Wooster (Bertram Wilberforce Wooster), a character in the comedic Jeeves stories
- Colonel Sir Harold Wilberforce Clifton, main character of the Franco-Belgian comics series Clifton
- Colonel Wilberforce Buckshot, a character in the Laurel and Hardy film Another Fine Mess

== See also ==
- Wilberforce (cat), who lived at 10 Downing Street between 1973 and 1987
- Wilberforce (disambiguation)
