= Wilberforce, New South Wales =

Wilberforce
- Suburb
- Interactive map of Wilberforce
- Coordinates: 33°33′34″S 150°50′26″E
- Country: Australia
- State: New South Wales
- City: Sydney
- LGA: City of Hawkesbury
- Location: 62 km (39 mi) from Sydney CBD

Government
  - State electorate: Hawkesbury
  - Federal division: Macquarie
- Elevation: 20 m (66 ft)

Population
  - Total: 2,957 (2021 census)
- Postcode: 2756
Suburbs around Wilberforce
| East Kurrajong | East Kurrajong | Ebenezer |
| Glossodia and Freemans Reach | Wilberforce | South Maroota |
| Freemans Reach | Pitt Town | Maraylya |

Wilberforce is a small town in New South Wales, Australia, in the local government area of the City of Hawkesbury. It is just beyond the outer suburbs of north-west Sydney and lies on the western bank of the Hawkesbury River.

== History ==
Wilberforce is one of the original settlements established as a township by Lachlan Macquarie, colonial governor of New South Wales 1810–21. It is known locally as "Macquarie Town", a title given to townships established by Governor Macquarie on 6 December 1810 in and around the Sydney metropolitan area. It was named after William Wilberforce (1759–1833), who was a British politician, philanthropist, and a leader of the movement to abolish the slave trade.

== Heritage listings ==
Wilberforce has a number of heritage-listed sites, including:

- Clergy Road: Wilberforce Cemetery
- 47 George Road: Wilberforce Park
- 43–43a Macquarie Road: St John's Anglican Church and Macquarie Schoolhouse
- Rose Street: Australiana Pioneer Village
- Rose Street: Rose Cottage
- Stannix Park Road: Stannix Park House

=== Key sites and points of interest ===
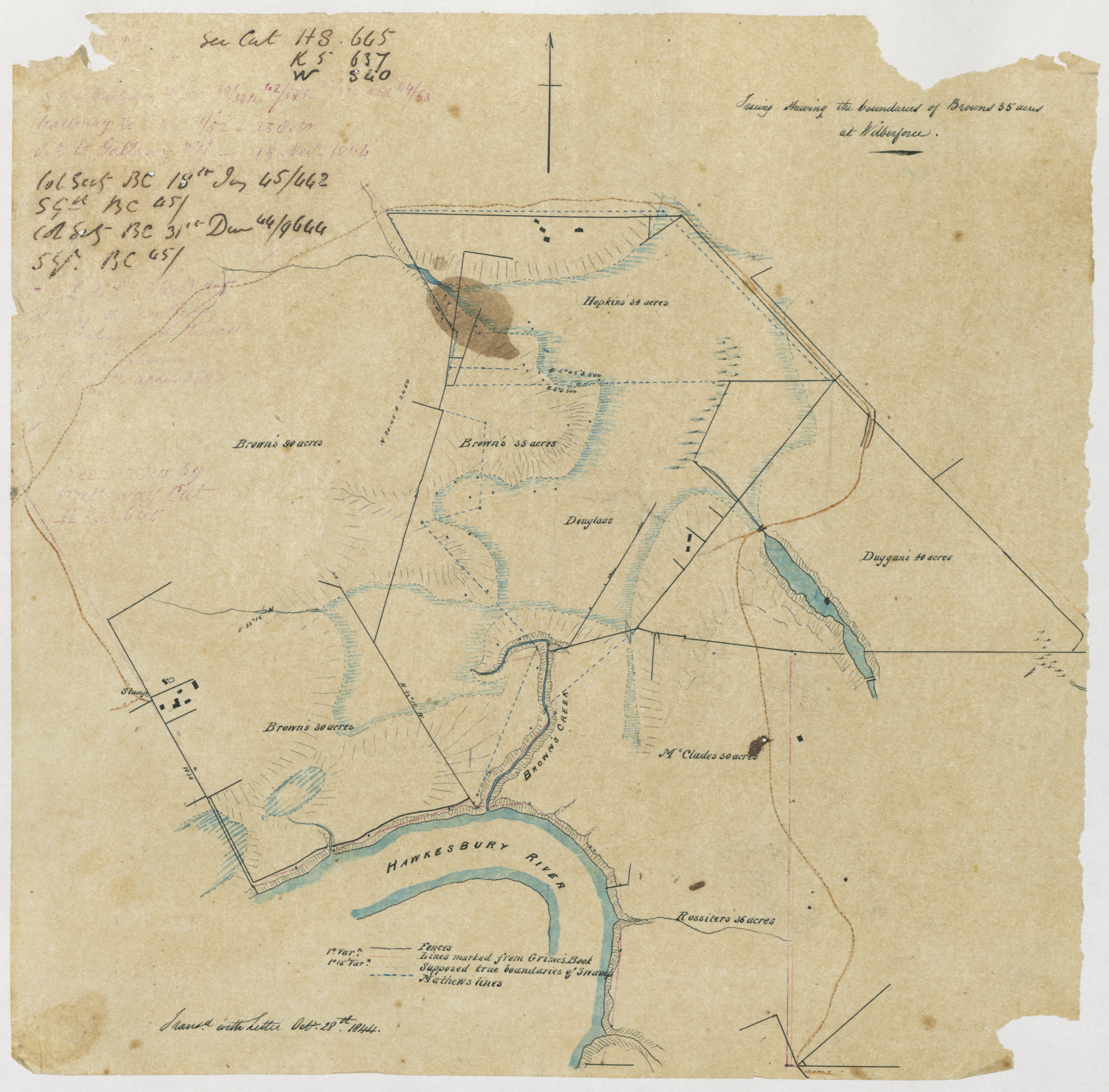
1844 map of its easternmost side

==== Macquarie Schoolhouse (1819) and St John's Church (1859) ====
The historic St John's Anglican Church was designed by Edmund Thomas Blacket and built by J. Atkinson of Windsor. Construction was started in 1856 and the building was not completed until 1859 at a cost of £1500. The grounds of the church and contains the Old School House building (Built 1819), which was used as a school, a church, and a residence of the school master until the church was completed. The school house was replaced in 1880 by a Public School. The original church building is still used for the church's 8 am service with the modern education centre used for later services.

==== Howorth Grave (1804, relocated 1960) ====
Relocated to a position in front of the schoolhouse, the grave marks the death of a child bitten by a snake on a nearby property. Grave moved on 5 December 1960 by the Hawkesbury Historical Society.

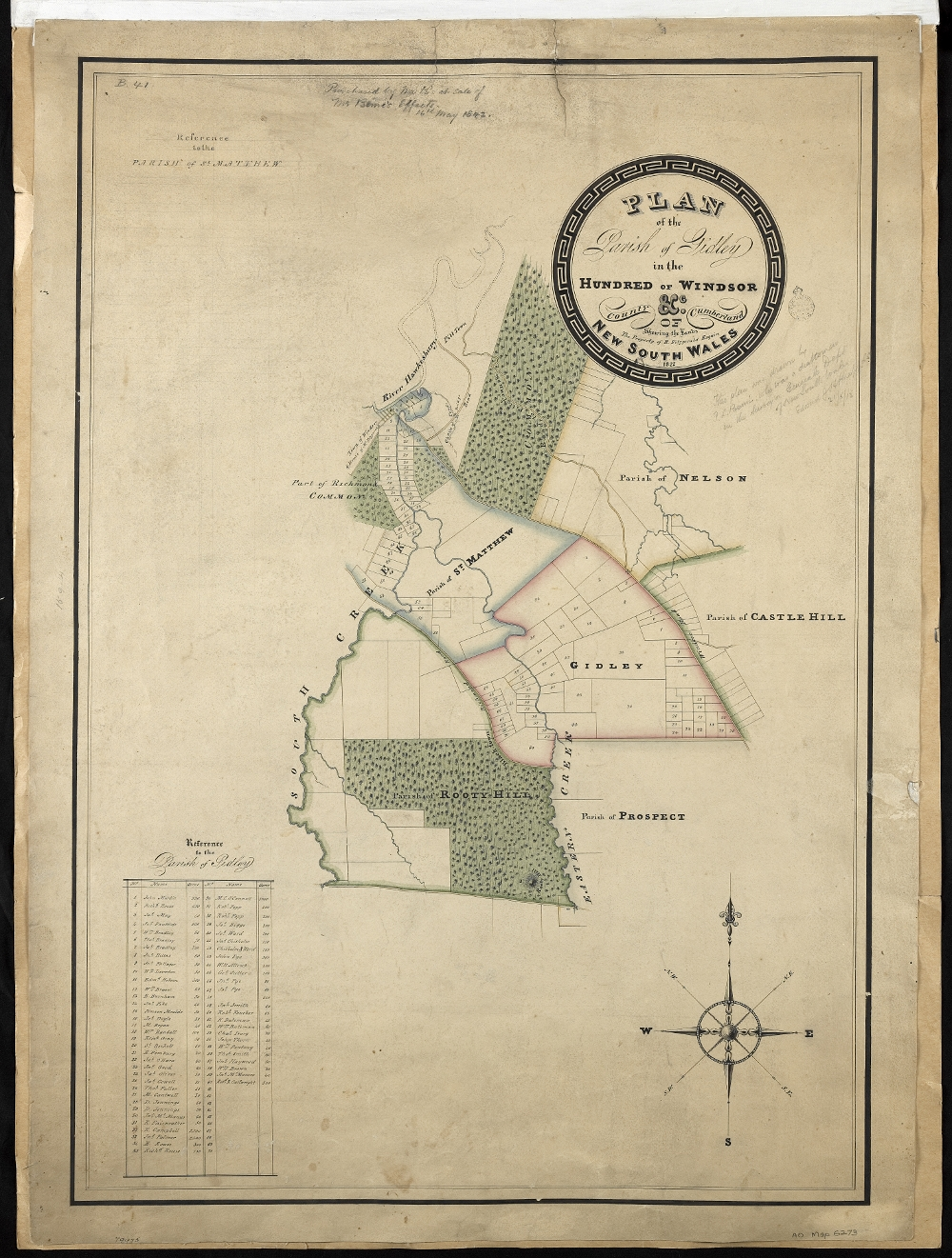
Wilberforce (unmarked) is on north side of River opposite Pitt Town

Wilberforce Park (1810)

This is the original town square proclaimed by Macquarie, and still retains its original relationship with the schoolhouse, cemetery and townships. In the park itself is the War Memorial, erected by local residents in 1918. In 1966, it was relocated within the park, and new plaques were added at this time.

==== Australiana Pioneer Village ====
Opened around 1970, the village contains a number of buildings from the surrounding area which were physically transported to the site. Among them is 'Rose Cottage'; the oldest timber slab cottage in Australia standing on its original site.

==== Wilberforce Cemetery (1815 onwards) ====
This cemetery sits on Old Sackville Road, near the intersection with Singleton Road (Putty Road). There are a number of graves of the area's pioneers; notably the somewhat unusual Table Slab Grave.

== Notable residents ==
Wilberforce is the birthplace of bushranger Captain Thunderbolt.

== Bibliography ==
- Discover the Hawkesbury. "Wilberforce". https://www.discoverthehawkesbury.com.au/hawkesbury-towns/wilberforce
- Hawkesbury People & Places. "Wilberforce Cemetery". https://www.hawkesbury.org/name/wilberforce-cemetery.html
- McHardy, Cathy & Nicholas McHardy. Sacred to the Memory - A Study of Wilberforce Cemetery. 2003.
