= St John's Anglican Church and Macquarie Schoolhouse =

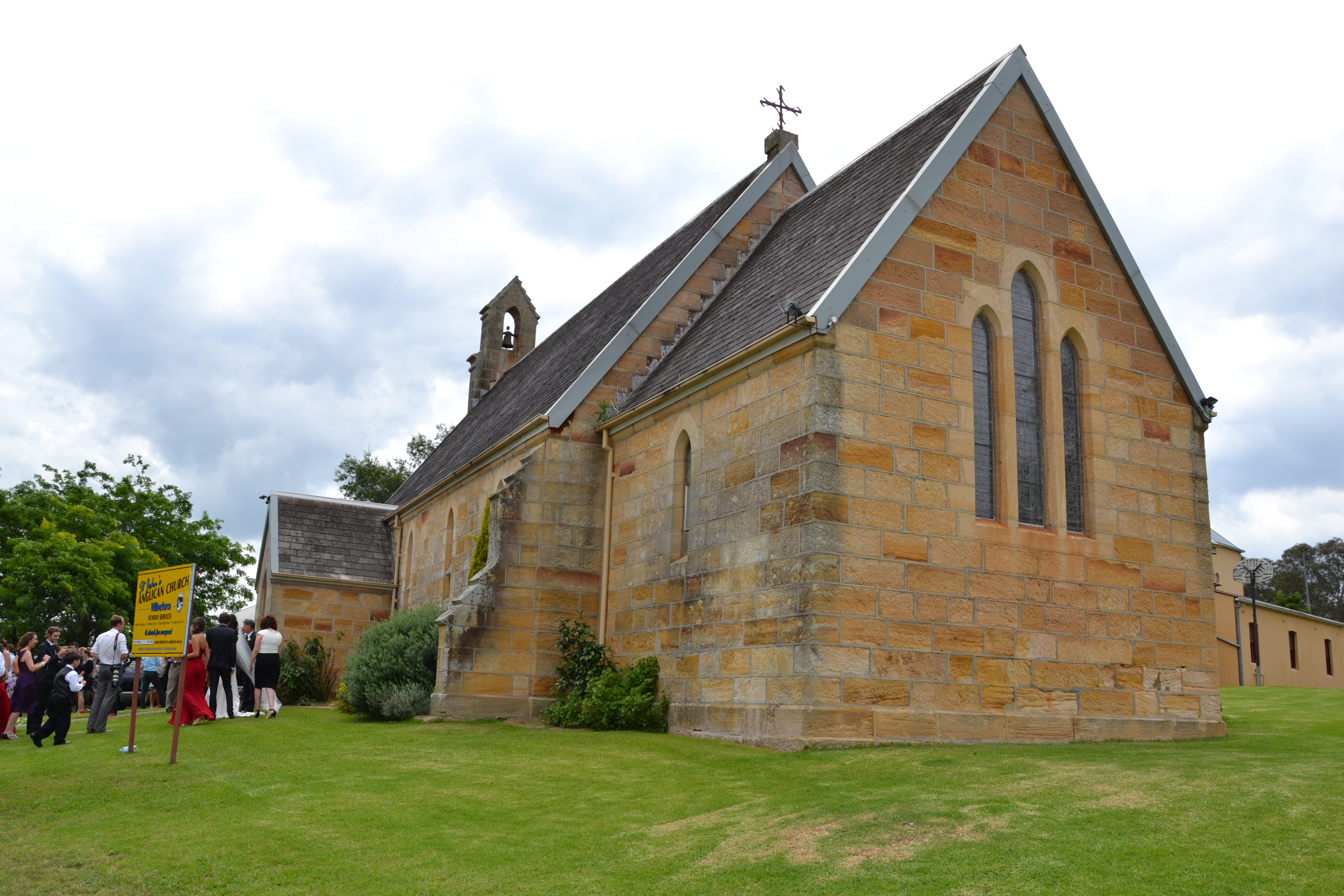
- St John's Anglican Church, Wilberforce

- Location of St John's Anglican Church and Macquarie Schoolhouse in New South Wales
- 33°33′18″S 150°50′39″E
- Location: 43–43a Macquarie Road, Wilberforce, City of Hawkesbury, New South Wales
- Country: Australia
- Denomination: Anglican
- Website: stjohnswilberforce.org.au/about/

History
- Status: Church

Architecture
- Functional status: Active
- Architect: Edmund Blacket (church)
- Architectural type: Victorian Academic Gothic
- Years built: 1819–1859

New South Wales Heritage Register
- Official name: Macquarie Schoolhouse/Chapel and St. John's (Blacket) Church; Former Macquarie Schoolhouse/Chapel; Wilberforce Schoolhouse; St John's Anglican Church
- Type: State heritage (complex / group)
- Designated: 20 August 2010
- Reference no.: 1836
- Type: Church
- Category: Religion
- Builders: John Brabyn (schoolhouse); James Atkinson, senior (St John's Church)

St John's Anglican Church and Macquarie Schoolhouse is a heritage-listed Anglican church building and church hall located at 43–43a Macquarie Road, Wilberforce, City of Hawkesbury, New South Wales, Australia. The church was designed by Edmund Blacket and built from 1819 to 1859 by James Atkinson, senior; and the schoolhouse was built by John Brabyn. The church is also known as the St. John's (Blacket) Church, while the hall (former schoolhouse) is also known as the Macquarie Schoolhouse/Chapel and the Wilberforce Schoolhouse. It was added to the New South Wales State Heritage Register on 20 August 2010.

== History ==
The Darug (various spellings) occupied the area from Botany Bay to Port Jackson north-west to the Hawkesbury and into the Blue Mountains. The cultural life of the Darug was reflected in the art they left on rock faces. Before 1788, there were probably 5,000 to 8,000 Aboriginal people in the Sydney region. Of these, about 2,000 were probably inland Darug, with about 1,000 living between Parramatta and the Blue Mountains. They lived in bands of about 50 people, and each band hunted over its own territory. The Gommerigal-tongarra lived on both sides of South Creek. The Boorooboorongal lived on the Nepean from Castlereagh to Richmond. Little information was collected about the Aborigines of the Hawkesbury before their removal by white settlement so details of their lifestyle have to be inferred from the practices of other south-eastern Aborigines. It is believed they lived in bark gunyahs. The men hunted game and the women foraged for food.

On 15 December 1810, Macquarie issued an Order laying out five towns along the Hawkesbury River. One at Green Hills would be called Windsor. Another at Richmond Hill District would be called Richmond. A third in the Nelson district would be named Pitt Town. The village in the Phillip district would be called Wilberforce and the fifth in the Evan district was Castlereagh. Nearby settlers would be allotted sites on these towns to build. Reverend Samuel Marsden was instructed by Macquarie on 2 February 1811 to consecrate the burial grounds at the new towns on the Hawkesbury including Wilberforce. Surveyor Evans would show him the areas set aside.

=== Macquarie Schoolhouse ===
Macquarie's Instructions from the Colonial Office included not just the establishment of towns but also the creation of schools, a policy with which Macquarie was in complete agreement. His Order of 11 May 1811 strongly recommended to parents and family heads "The Education and Instruction of the Youth of both Sexes being an Object of the utmost Importance, as laying the Foundation of many Advantages to the rising Generations". Macquarie encouraged local residents to fund and establish schools themselves but also assisted with government funds. His Order of 11 May 1811 encouraged the establishment of schoolhouses at the initiative of local communities and promised to contribute A£25 of government money to each schoolhouse. At the same time, he directed that settlers should no longer bury their dead on their farms but in the burial grounds consecrated and measured out "some time since" in places such as Wilberforce.

Schoolhouses were often used for religious purposes until churches were erected near them in the 1850s. These combined schoolhouses, chapels and schoolmaster's residences were a feature of early Macquarie towns on the Hawkesbury. They were built at Castlereagh, Wilberforce, Pitt Town and Richmond often sited in commanding positions with a square nearby.

Reverend Cartwright was paid A£10 before 1 July 1812 for "inclosing the Burial Ground at the Township of Wilberforce". Macquarie's journal noted he visited Wilberforce on 21 May 1813 to mark the site for a new schoolhouse. The Government contributed A£50 towards "Building a Government temporary Chapel and School House, in the Township of Wilberforce" in 1813. On 28 April 1814, he reported that schoolhouses, which would serve as temporary chapels, had already been erected at various places including Wilberforce. It was not a major school. On 20 April 1818 he informed Samuel Marsden that apart from schools in major centres there were also inferior schools at places such as Wilberforce teaching the rudiments of education.

In 1819, a new brick building replaced the earlier temporary one.

Convicted London joiner and carpenter James Gough (1790-1876) who arrived on the Earl Spencer in 1813 and gained his conditional pardon in 1821, won the private contract to build a school at Wilbeforce.

By 30 September 1819, John Brabyn had been paid A£200 for "erecting a School-house and temporary Place of Worship at Wilberforce". On 31 May 1820, D Wentworth paid Brabyn an additional A£85/16/1 for enlarging and completing the School House. This may have funded the skillion at the rear. The skillion addition seems to have been an afterthought to accommodate the schoolmaster but seems to be almost contemporary with the main building as the brick work and fireplace are bonded into the main building. It has been claimed that it was built of sun-dried bricks with stone quoins and was whitewashed with lime to which fat had been added to protect it from the weather. However, in the absence of documentary proof or physical analysis to confirm it this claim cannot be verified. The original roof was of open timberwork with three tie beams. Shutters originally protected the windows. At a later stage, verandahs were added on the western, southern and part of the eastern side.

In September 1821, the Sydney Gazette reported that there were "thriving and ably-conducted Public Schools" at Wilberforce, Pitt Town and Richmond. The Schoolmaster at Wilberforce was William Gow who lived in the lower rooms. The school continued to operate throughout the 1820s. Total enrolments varied between 30 and 40 pupils.

A Government Order in the Sydney Gazette of 1823 states that the annual musters are to be held in the schoolhouse at Wilberforce.

When surveyor Felton Mathew drew his plan of Wilberforce in July 1833, he showed the schoolhouse building as a "Church". A later plan of the town used in the Surveyor-General's Dept included a sketch of this building labelled as "Church & School".

One of the schoolhouse pupils of this period was Fred Ward, born in Windsor in 1835, who later adopted the alias Captain Thunderbolt as the last of the professional bushrangers of NSW.

The schoolhouse was no longer used as a church after the new St John's Church was completed in 1859. The land had not yet been vested in the Church. On 9 August 1858, surveyor Charles S Whitaker transmitted his plan of the allotment in Wilberforce for the Church of England Church, School and Parsonage. The plan showed the new Church along Macquarie Street and the school building at the rear, plus fencing and some topography. On 16 July 1863, an area of 7 acres 2 roods and 15 perches at Wilberforce, part of Section 13, was dedicated to the public for a Church of England Church, School and Parsonage. A formal grant for the school site was not issued until 16 February 1872. An area of 3 acres 1 rood 21 perches was granted to William Bragg, John Henry Fleming and James Rose Buttsworth as trustees of the schoolhouse site (T-shaped parcel of land) under Church of England. On the same day, the church and parsonage sites on either side were also granted.

In 1864, Inspector McCredie reported to the Council of Education that the schoolhouse was much in need of repair. In 1865, he reported it had been repaired for A£80. Varying dates have been given for the closure of the building as a school. One source gives the date as 1874. However, Wilberforce was not on the 1879 list of Denominational Schools closed since 1872. The 1880 list of Anglican Denominational Schools operating listed one at Wilberforce with 42 pupils enrolled. The new Public School opened on 6 July 1880 and the older schoolhouse apparently closed that year. The 1881 list of Anglican Denominational Schools did not include one at Wilberforce. Thereafter, it seems to have been used as a church hall.

When surveyor Charles Robert Scrivener surveyed Wilberforce on 22 August 1894, his plan showed the "Old Church" i.e. schoolhouse and the "New Church". A drawing of the schoolhouse by William Johnson dated about 1900 showed what appeared to be a brick building with a shingle roof, five multi-paned sash windows on the upper floor and four on the lower with central doorway and verandah at front, apparently also shingled. A brick chimney was at the side.

A verandah was added on the western side at an unknown date clad with shingles later replaced by corrugated iron. The exterior was cement rendered in 1911 to arrest the fretting of the brickwork and the skillion was also cement rendered shortly afterwards. A photograph by Kerry & Co dated from 1890 (copied in 1932) showed the roof as shingled. A photograph of 1920 showed the schoolhouse with a shingled roof. Another photograph dated as 1937 showed the roof clad with corrugated iron, suggesting that it was re-roofed in the 1920s or 1930s. The former steep staircase was replaced by one with a gentler grade in 1966. The original shutters have disappeared. A photograph of 1970 in Wymark showed the original multi-paned windows replaced by what appear to be double-hung sash windows. Another photo in Wymark which is not as clear suggests that the windows had been replaced as early as 1920. A fire in 1985 meant much of the roof and interior timberwork was replaced.

A tombstone for John Howorth (died 1804) located on the south side of the Macquarie schoolhouse was moved here in 1960 from the farm near the river south of the village where he was originally buried. It is also included in this listing. It demonstrates burial practices on the Hawkesbury before official cemeteries were established there in Macquarie's period as governor.

=== St John's Church ===
At a public meeting on 4 November 1846 called by Reverend T. C. Ewing, public support for building a new church for Wilberforce was sought. The schoolroom used as a place of worship was no longer large enough for the congregation and according to Joshua Vickery "a school-room was not a proper place in which to worship". A committee was formed to erect the new church and a sum of A£100/15/0 was subscribed. If A£300 could be raised they were entitled to government aid. By February 1848, a plan of the proposed church prepared by Edmund Blacket, was available for viewing at the schoolhouse.

A grant of A£450 was approved by the Executive Council of NSW in 1850 to erect the church. Reverend T C Ewing informed the Colonial Secretary on 24 January 1854 that construction of the church had been delayed by the gold rushes. He asked if the funds in support were still available. The builder was James Atkinson. On 13 August 1856, James Atkinson, senior, builder of Windsor advertised for "three or four good Quarrymen and three or four good Masons, to perform the work of a Church". Reverend Frederic Barker, Bishop of Sydney, laid the foundation stone of the new church on 17 December 1856.

After architect Edmund T. Blacket approved the work completed up to 27 April 1857 by J Atkinson amounting in value to A£648, the bulk of funds voted by parliament were transferred to the church. Alexander Dawson, the Colonial Architect, valued the work at A£1,310 on 11 September 1858. The balance of A£20 of the grant was then paid to the church on 17 September 1858.

The Bishop of Sydney consecrated the new church on 12 April 1859 and 29 people were confirmed. The teacher at the school, John Wenban, presented a sundial to the church at its consecration and it remains in place.

A photograph by Kerry & Co dated from 1890 (copied in 1932) showed the church roof as shingled. A photograph of 1920 also showed the church with a shingled roof. The roof was reclad with fibro slates in 1950.

In 1914, the interior and exterior stonework was tuckpointed. An oak Communion Table and Reredos were presented by the parishioners to the church at the centenary of the schoolhouse/chapel. Electric light was installed in St John's Church in 1934. In 1970, three hanging kerosene lamps were still suspended from the ceiling.

The east and west windows (c. 1899 and 1878) are memorials to Dunston family members. The Dunston family was one with a long association with the district and church. John Henry Fleming's memorial window (c. 1894) commemorates another with a close association with the church.

== Description ==
=== Macquarie Schoolhouse ===
The Macquarie School House at Wilberforce is the only surviving example of a small number of school houses which combined a schoolroom and schoolmaster's residence with the schoolroom serving as a church on Sundays.

The school house is a two-storey Colonial Georgian building with a hipped roof and ground floor verandah to the west and south. The verandah roof returns along the east side where it becomes part of a rear skillion. The front facade, facing west, is divided into five bays.

The former schoolhouse is constructed of brick. The bricks to the main building are soft bricks of local red clay. It is not clear whether the bricks were fired or were just sundried. The few bricks in the original part of the building that are visible have lost their outside skin. The bricks to the skillion appear to be of a different clay, suggesting that the skillion was a slightly later addition. Render on the external walls and plaster on the internal walls makes it difficult to assess these bricks in detail.

The roof is sheeted in galvanised steel with close eaves and the walls are rendered with ashlar coursing. The render dates from c. 1911. Sandstone quoins are on the corners of the front (west) elevation. There are two corbelled brick chimneys, one on the north side and one on the east. Both chimneys are expressed on the external face of the wall.

The framing to the verandah is not original. When the verandah was replaced, the verandah roofline was also altered at the southeast corner. The skillion meets the wall of the main building at a higher level than the verandah. Early photos show the roof of the skillion continuing across the full length of the east side. The verandah roof now returns around the southeast corner to meet the south wall of the skillion.

Windows to the ground floor are nine over six pane double hung sashes to the original part of the building. The skillion has windows with six over six pane double-hung sashes. Windows to the first floor are six over six pane double-hung sashes and are unusual in having a deep timber frame at the head. All the windows in the main part of the building have timber lintels. Those in the skillion have low brick arches. The doors are ledged and sheeted with beaded boards. The front door retains its original gudgeon pins and iron brackets for the internal security rail. It is in an arched opening with a rendered panel above the transom.

A series of plaques on the south wall of the building record the construction and development of the building and commemorate a number of the schoolmasters who served at the school.

Internally, the building has a simple layout. The ground floor of the main part of the building has two rooms and a stair hall. The skillion also has two rooms connected by a very low door. The first floor is a single large room. A later six panelled door connects the north room of the main building to the north room of the skillion. The walls of the ground floor rooms are plastered. Ceilings in the ground floor of the main part of the building are sheeted and battened, ceilings in the skillion are ripple iron. The first floor has exposed roof framing. Three heavy timber tie beams that appear to be original survive. The main roof framing and boards above were replaced after the 1985 fire. The fireplace at the north end of the first floor retains some elements of the original timber chimneypiece.

A headstone for John Howorth (died 1804), now located next to the schoolhouse, is included in the listing. It was moved in the 1960s from its original location where he was buried on a Hawkesbury farm . It dates from the period before the establishment of the burial ground at Wilberforce when the dead were buried on their farms. It is believed to be the oldest known tombstone from the Hawkesbury region.

The site contains a significant view corridor from the verandah of the Schoolhouse to the Wilberforce Cemetery.

=== St John's Church ===
St John's Anglican Church is a Victorian Academic Gothic style church set at an angle to the street to enable the church to face east. The church is a simple gabled building of four bays, with a gabled chancel at the east end, a gabled porch on the south side and a gabled vestry on the north side of the chancel.

The church has a steeply pitched roof of compressed cement sheet shingles, replacing the original timber shingles. Modern colorbond barge flashings have replaced the original exposed ends of the shingles and battens. The roof steps down at the east end to mark the narrowing of the church for the chancel.

The body of the walls of the church are of pointed sandstone, with smooth-faced stone around the narrow pointed arched windows. The walls have been repointed in cementious mortar. At the west end is an elegant belfry, still with its bell.

The windows are framed in metal and have diamond pattern leadlight to the top and bottom sashes. The central sash is a pivot sash. Taller stained glass windows are at the east and west ends. The doors are framed and sheeted in pointed-arched openings. Moulded timber battens have been applied to the external face of the doors to emphasise the appearance of vertical joints. A simple iron handrail is on the side of the southern entry porch.

An important feature on the north wall is the original sundial, still marking the time with accuracy. It is painted with the hours of the day in Roman numerals, the date 1859 and the initials of its creator John Wenban.

Internally, the church retains its original sandstone walls, although these have been painted in the vestry. It is not known whether the exposed cedar hammerbeam roof trusses and timber boarding are original fabric. The internal fixtures and fittings are largely non-original fabric. These include: the cedar pulpit, dado and altar rail in the chancel: the gothic style cedar altar; the iron cord cleats fixed to cedar roses on the windows, and brass hooks holding iron brackets for candles that are fixed to the cedar roses. An oak Communion Table and Reredos date from 1920.

Around the walls of the church are a variety of memorial tablets commemorating notable local citizens, former ministers and those lost in war as well as tablets marking commemorative events.

The two light East window is a memorial to Elizabeth Dunston who died in 1899 and her husband John Dunston who had died in 1876. Another window in the nave is in memory of John Fleming, who died in 1894. The West end windows are in memory of John Thomas Dunstan, who died in 1878. The manufacturer is not known.

=== St John's Church ===
St John's Church is substantially intact in its form, setting and external appearance apart from the replacement of the original timber shingle roof with cement sheet shingles. Much of the internal detail and fittings is also intact. Some sandstone blocks have weathered more quickly than others but most are in excellent condition. Some of the joints on the keystones over the northern and southern entry porches have cracked but apart from a small crack where the southern wall joins the south-east buttress, the rest of the joints appear to be in fine condition. A few asbestos slates on the roof are slipping. Overall, the church appears to be in excellent condition.

As the location of the original temporary schoolhouse/chapel, one of the earliest known buildings in Wilberforce, which pre-dates the current 1819 Macquarie schoolhouse/chapel, this site has archaeological potential. Since the location of the original school/chapel building is not known, potentially the whole site is involved.

Although modified over the years and repaired after fire damage, the Macquarie Schoolhouse still retains its original form and fenestration. Some of the internal joinery, notably the roof tie-beams, and the hardware on some doors still survives. In view of its age, the Schoolhouse has a high degree of original fabric. St John's Church is intact in its form and setting apart from the replacement of the original timber shingle roof with cement sheet shingles. Much of the internal detail and fittings are non-original fabric.

=== Modifications and dates ===
Former Macquarie Schoolhouse/Chapel:

- External render c. 1911
- Internal stair 1920s, 1966 and 1980s
- Shingle roof replaced with corrugated iron possibly 1920s or 1930s
- Corrugated steel roof c. 1985
- New roof framing c. 1985 (three original tie beams retained)
- The first floor windows were replaced after a fire in 1985.
- Alteration to junction of verandah and skillion roof c. 1985?
- Concrete slab to ground floor.

St John's (Blacket) Church:

- Roof replaced with compressed cement sheet shingles, 1950.
- Colorbond barge flashings
- Cement pointing internally and externally 1914
- Oak Communion Table and Reredos added 1920
- Painting of walls in vestry

== Heritage listing ==
Wilberforce Schoolhouse was erected to meet the desire of Governor Lachlan Macquarie to promote education and religion at the core of towns he laid out on the Hawkesbury. His scheme of establishing a school, church and burial ground at an elevated and/or central position was completely realised at Wilberforce during his governorship. He chose the sites of the town, church and burial ground personally. His creation of these towns in 1810 was an important expression of the developmental philosophy of settlement coupled with deliberate social engineering to control convict society and to implant a moral economy into their lifestyles. The establishment of the Schoolhouse demonstrated the importance Governor Macquarie attached to educating the children of the emancipated convicts of the Hawkesbury who constituted the rising generation of colonial freeborn.

Of all the church/school/cemetery centres established in the four towns where this combination was established (i.e. Castlereagh, Pitt Town, Wilberforce and Richmond) the combination at Wilberforce is the one which is mostly intact, with the schoolhouse surviving from his governorship in conjunction with the cemetery in a commanding position above the town. By laying out the village, selecting the site of the square, church and cemetery, plus promoting the construction of the schoolhouse-cum-chapel, Governor Lachlan Macquarie left his personal signature on the village of Wilberforce. The curtilage includes the significant view corridor from the verandah of the Schoolhouse to Wilberforce Cemetery. The church of St John completed in 1859 to the design of architect Edmund T Blacket added an additional element which secured the continued use of this site for its original purpose by enabling the congregation to continue meeting in a building which could accommodate them all. St John's Anglican Church is a fine example of a simple rural church in the Victorian Gothic style by the esteemed nineteenth-century architect Edmund Blacket. Blacket designed over 100 churches, of which over 30 were small churches often in rural locations for small congregations. Designed in 1847 and erected between 1857 and 1859, St John's Church at Wilberforce is intact in its form and setting and a fine example of Blacket's early, small rural churches.

The church has a rare example of a vertical sundial in Australia, the work of the former schoolmaster, John Wenban.

St John's Anglican Church and Macquarie Schoolhouse was listed on the New South Wales State Heritage Register on 20 August 2010 having satisfied the following criteria.

The place is important in demonstrating the course, or pattern, of cultural or natural history in New South Wales.

It meets this criterion of State significance because the Wilberforce Schoolhouse was erected to meet the desire of Governor Lachlan Macquarie to promote education and religion at the core of the towns he laid out on the Hawkesbury. His scheme of establishing a school, church and burial ground at an elevated and/or central position was fully realised at Wilberforce during his governorship. He chose the sites of the town, church and burial ground personally. His creation of these towns on the Hawkesbury in 1810 was an important expression of the developmental philosophy of settlement coupled with deliberate social engineering to control convict society and to implant a moral economy and education of the young into their lifestyles. The establishment of the Schoolhouse demonstrated the importance Governor Macquarie attached to educating the children of the emancipated convicts of the Hawkesbury who constituted the rising generation of colonial freeborn. Of all the church/school/cemetery centres established in these towns, Wilberforce is the one which is most intact, with the schoolhouse surviving from his governorship in conjunction with the cemetery in a commanding position above the town. The Schoolhouse is also significant as the location of the annual muster from 1823. The site includes the significant view corridor from the verhadah of the Schoolhouse to the Wilberforce Cemetery. The church of St John completed in 1859 to the design of architect Edmund T Blacket added an additional element which secured the continued use of this site for its original purpose by enabling the congregation to continue meeting in a building which could accommodate them all.

The place has a strong or special association with a person, or group of persons, of importance of cultural or natural history of New South Wales's history.

It meets this criterion of State significance because the Wilberforce Schoolhouse and its site have a close association with Governor Lachlan Macquarie. It was erected to meet his desire to promote education and religion at the core of the towns he laid out on the Hawkesbury. His scheme of establishing a school, church and burial ground on an elevated and/or central position was fully realised at Wilberforce during his governorship. He chose the sites of the town, church and burial ground personally. His creation of these towns in 1810 was an important expression of the developmental philosophy of settlement coupled with deliberate social engineering to control convict society and to implant a moral economy into their lifestyles. The establishment of the Schoolhouse demonstrated the importance Governor Macquarie attached to educating the children of the emancipated convicts of the Hawkesbury who constituted the rising generation of colonial freeborn. Not only did he establish the policy regarding the towns and their schools-cum-chapels but he personally visited the sites to select the best positions. By laying out the village, selecting the site of the square, church and cemetery, plus promoting the construction of the schoolhouse-cum-chapel, Governor Lachlan Macquarie left his personal signature on the village of Wilberforce. Of all the church/school/cemetery centres established in the towns, this is the one which is most intact, with the schoolhouse surviving from his governorship in conjunction with the cemetery in a commanding position above the town. The Schoolhouse is also significant as the location of the annual muster from 1823. The church of St John was completed in 1859 to the design of architect Edmund T Blacket who was a church architect of considerable significance since his Gothic style churches largely created the ecclesiastical style of building so strongly associated with the Victorian era in NSW. Wilberforce Schoolhouse and St John's are also associated with John Wenban, a noted early schoolteacher who taught at the school for many years and who donated the unusual sundial which graces the exterior of St John's Church.

The place is important in demonstrating aesthetic characteristics and/or a high degree of creative or technical achievement in New South Wales.

The Macquarie schoolhouse is of high aesthetic significance as a surviving and reasonably intact substantial Old Colonial Georgian building. Changes to the building have not altered its original form and symmetry. Deliberately sited near one of the highest points in the town to ensure the prominence of the church in the burgeoning community, with the adjacent church it remains a focal point in the townscape.

St John's Anglican Church is a fine example of a simple rural church in the Victorian Gothic style by the esteemed nineteenth-century architect Edmund Blacket. Blacket designed over 100 churches, of which over 30 were small churches often in rural locations for small congregations. Designed in 1847 and erected between 1857 and 1859, St John's Church at Wilberforce is intact in its form and setting and a fine example of Blacket's early, small rural churches.

The church has a rare example of a vertical sundial in Australia, the work of the former schoolmaster, John Wenban.

The place has a strong or special association with a particular community or cultural group in New South Wales for social, cultural or spiritual reasons.

It meets this criterion of State significance because the Macquarie schoolhouse was the focus for education in Wilberforce until the 1870s whilst the schoolhouse and its successor St John's Church in association with its cemetery have been the core of religious activity in Wilberforce until the present day providing an unbroken chain of use and association for the community stretching back for nearly 200 years. The present church community at Wilberforce is a strong one, with worshippers drawn from beyond the Hawkesbury and is larger than the size of the village would suggest. A number of services are held each Sunday. The Blacket church is used for a traditional service in the morning for those who prefer that form of worship. The commanding position of the site, with the schoolhouse and St John's Church, plus the associated burial ground, have provided a strong and visible focus for community identity.

The Hawkesbury was an important focus for early settlement from the 1790s. As the community grew, younger sons and the adventurous set out to settle newer lands, a process that continued throughout the nineteenth century. Since Wilberforce was one of the hearthlands of early Australia from which numerous families and individuals ventured forth to settle new lands and establish new communities elsewhere, it possesses a strong attraction for a broad spectrum of people who live beyond the district and draws them back to visit and refresh their family associations with Wilberforce. Church and cemetery are invariably a goal for many such visitors.

The place has potential to yield information that will contribute to an understanding of the cultural or natural history of New South Wales.

As the sole surviving example of a Macquarie town, with the original church/schoolhouse and cemetery still at the core of the village design as laid out by Macquarie, it meets this criterion of State significance. Only at Wilberforce is there tangible physical evidence of the manner in which Macquarie implemented his policy of social engineering through town planning with the civilising elements of education and religion at the core. A combined school and church at the centre of town or in a high position, coupled with a cemetery where all people were directed to inter their dead continually exposed former convicts to these influences with greater or lesser impact. The loss of key elements of the same combinations in the other towns he established means that only at Wilberforce can the full physical, sensory and aesthetic impact of this scheme be experienced.

As a site with early buildings, most notably the original temporary schoolhouse/chapel one of the earliest known buildings in Wilberforce which pre-dates the current 1819 Macquarie schoolhouse/chapel, the site has archaeological potential.

The place possesses uncommon, rare or endangered aspects of the cultural or natural history of New South Wales.

It meets this criterion of State significance because Governor Lachlan Macquarie's scheme of establishing a school, church and burial ground on an elevated and/or central position was fully realised at Wilberforce during his governorship. Of the four towns he established where Macquarie laid out a schoolhouse/chapel – Castlereagh, Pitt Town, Wilberforce and Richmond – only the Wilberforce example survives. The loss of elements of similar groups in other Macquarie towns or the loss of the inter-connectness of their parts means that the Macquarie Schoolhouse and St John's Church are arguably the purest expressions today of what Lachlan Macquarie sought to establish as key anchor points in his townscapes and in his programme of civilising convict society and ameliorating its less moral elements. His creation of these towns was an important expression of the developmental philosophy of settlement coupled with deliberate social engineering to control convict society and to implant a moral economy into their lifestyles. Of all the church/school/burial ground combinations established in the towns, Wilberforce is the one which is most intact, with the schoolhouse surviving from his governorship in conjunction with the cemetery in a commanding position above the town. The church of St John completed in 1859 to the design of architect Edmund T Blacket added an additional element which secured the continued use of this site for its original purpose. The elements of schoolhouse, church and cemetery are inter-dependent. Views between the different elements reinforce the power of religion and education and the hope that they would reinforce each other in re-making a new more moral society. Views into and out of the site intensified that objective. The school and church looked down from a commanding position. One had to look upwards to view the church and school.

The place is important in demonstrating the principal characteristics of a class of cultural or natural places/environments in New South Wales.

It meets this criterion of State significance because the Wilberforce Macquarie Schoolhouse and burial ground with its later addition of the Blacket church are the epitome of what Lachlan Macquarie wished to implement as demonstrable elements of power, education and religion. The loss of elements of similar groups in the other Macquarie towns or the loss of the inter-connectedness of their parts means that the Macquarie Schoolhouse and St John's are arguably the purest expressions today of what Lachlan Macquarie sought to establish as key anchor points in his townscapes and in his programme of civilising convict society and ameliorating its less moral elements.

St John's Anglican Church is a good representative example of the Victorian Gothic church. Features that are typical of the style include the steeply pitched roof, high quality stonework, belfry, chancel and narrow pointed arched windows. The simplicity of the church is a feature of his designs for rural churches and it is a fine and largely intact example of his rural work.

Edmund Thomas Blacket designed over 100 churches, of which over 30 were small churches often in rural locations for small congregations. St John's Church of England at Wilberforce was one of his small rural churches, designed in 1847 and erected between 1857 and 1859. Comparable small churches include St Mark's, Picton (1850–57), St John the Evangelist, Hartley (1857–59), St James, Pitt Town (1857–59) and Holy Trinity, Berrima (1849–). A small later church built for a modest rural community is All Saints, Condobolin (1878–79). Though there is no definite evidence that he designed it, circumstantial evidence points to Blacket as the designer. Many other churches designed by E T Blacket were for large towns such as Wellington and Goulburn or for Sydney or its suburbs, which were of a different order and scale to his smaller rural churches.

St John's Anglican Church is a fine example of a simple rural church in the Victorian Gothic style by the esteemed nineteenth-century architect Edmund Blacket. Blacket designed over 100 churches, of which over 30 were small churches often in rural locations for small congregations. Designed in 1847 and erected between 1857 and 1859, St John's Church at Wilberforce is intact in its form and setting and a fine example of Blacket's early, small rural churches.

== See also ==
- Australian non-residential architectural styles
- List of Anglican churches in the Diocese of Sydney
