= Bungarribee Homestead Site =

Bungarribee Homestead archaelological site
- Location within New South Wales Location within Australia
- 33.7788°S 150.8707°E
- Location: Doonside Road, Doonside, City of Blacktown, New South Wales, Australia

New South Wales Heritage Register
- Official name: Bungarribee Homestead Complex – Archaeological Site; Bungarribee House
- Type: state heritage (archaeological-terrestrial)
- Designated: 8 December 2000
- Reference no.: 1428
- Type: Homestead Complex
- Category: Farming and Grazing
- Builders: John Campbell, Thomas Icely, Charles Smith and John Kingdon Cleeve

Bungarribee Homestead
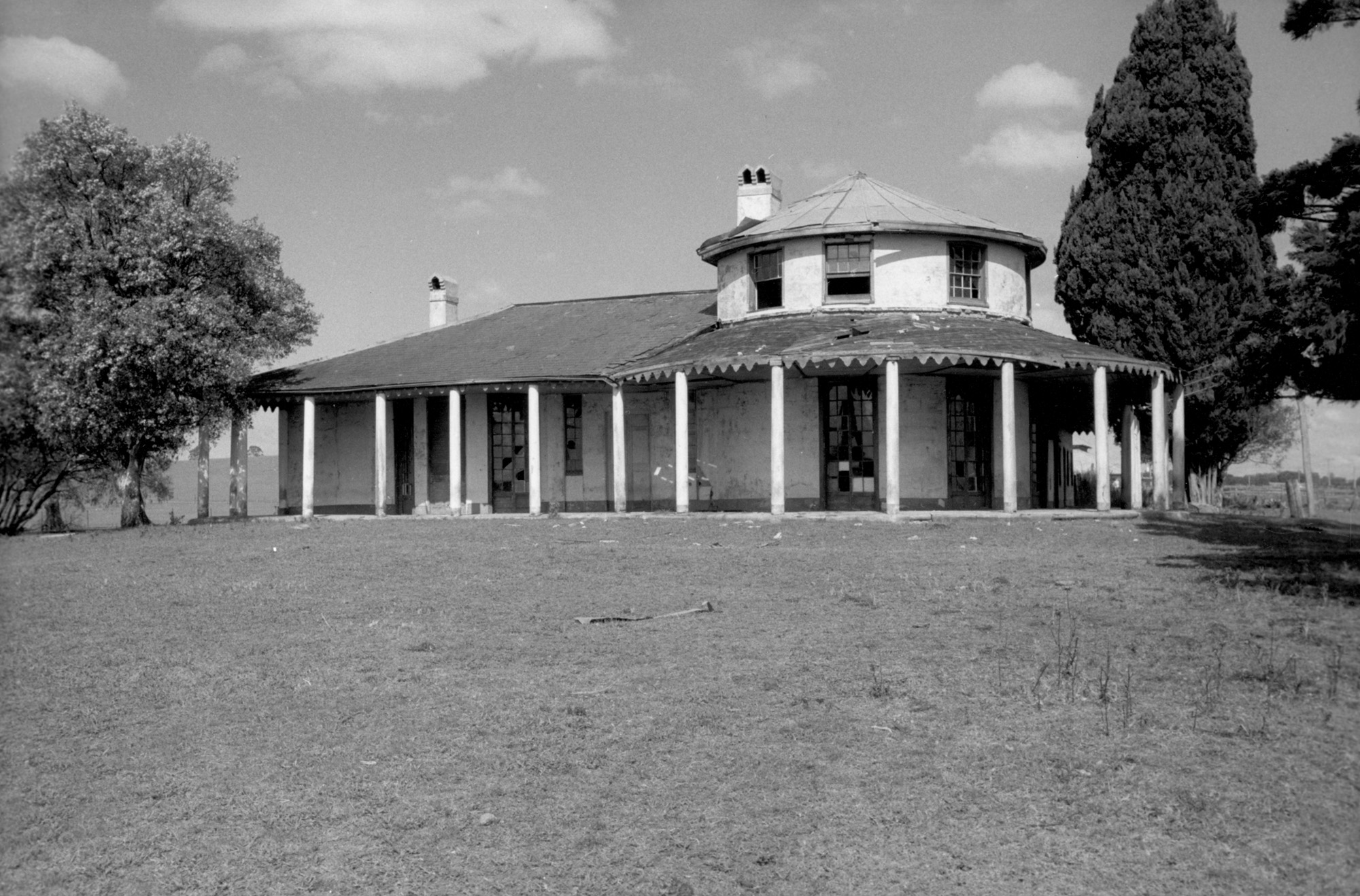
- Ruinous Bungarribee Homestead in 1954. The Italian Cypress, at right, still marks the site.
- Interactive map of the Bungarribee Homestead area

General information
- Architectural style: Cottage orné
- Location: Bungarribee; Sydney; New South Wales, Australia
- Construction started: c.1822–1827; 199 years ago
- Demolished: May 1957; 69 years ago
- Client: John Campbell

The Bungarribee Homestead Site is a heritage-listed archaeological site at the location of the former Bungarribee Homestead. The site is located at Doonside Road, Doonside, New South Wales, a suburb of Sydney, Australia. It was added to the New South Wales State Heritage Register on 8 December 2000.

== History ==
=== Darug people ===
The traditional owners of Bungarribee estate were the Warrawarry group of the Darug people. They were based around Eastern Creek and the surrounding forest and grassland and used these for food and shelter, hunting and gathering a wide array of animal and plant foods including fresh water fish, crayfish and shellfish.

A close examination of the documentation of Governor Phillip's first exploration of Parramatta's western hinterland in April 1788 reveals that the orthodox view that he went only as far as Prospect Hill or a little beyond is deeply flawed. His party is much more likely to have traversed Toongabbie, Seven Hills and Blacktown to climb Bungarribee Hill, Doonside and reaching Eastern Creek and Rooty Hill.

By the time of European settlement in the western regions after 1790, the original Aboriginal groups had been severely affected by an outbreak of smallpox that had first devastated the groups closest to the European settlement but rapidly spread through the entire Sydney district. Many of the surviving groups in the west had likely begun to come together to form amalgamated bands in order to survive.

Once European settlers began to move into the west, conflicts began to occur between them and the Warrawarry. The clearing and alienation of land by Europeans and consequent reduction in native foods led to clashes between surviving Aboriginal groups and the settlers. By the late 1790s, violence was becoming a feature of the interaction between the two cultures. In 1801 Governor Hunter ordered Aboriginals to be kept away from settlers' areas because of the perceived threat. By 1814 the population had dwindled and the survivors were forced to rely heavily on Europeans for food. A number of groups were reported camped on estates at Mamre, South Creek and Eastern Creek (it is not known if this was near Bungarribee).

Although bands of Aboriginal people continued to live around the estates and growing settlements up to the 1840s, by this time there were less than 300 recorded Darug people left, 10% of the 1788 population. This equated to less than 10% of the estimated population at the time of European arrival.

For many years "Bungarribee" was thought to mean "the burial place of a king" and was derived from the name of an Aboriginal man named "Bungaree" (also spelt Bungaroo, Boongaree). Bungaree reputedly died in the vicinity of Bungarribee. King Bungaree was a Guringai man who lived to the north of Sydney in the Broken Bay area. He was well known around Sydney, particularly for the role he played in key voyages of both Matthew Flinders and Phillip Gidley King during the late 18th and early 19th centuries. He was the first Aboriginal man to be presented with a breastplate by Governor Macquarie, in 1815 (engraved with 'Boongaree Chief of the Broken Bay Tribe, 1815'). According to Philip Clarke, Bungaree died in 1830 and is buried in Rose Bay. It is now thought that the name "Bungarribee" is derived from joining together two Darug words which in combination can be translated as "creek with cockatoos" or "creek with campsite". Neither Bungarribee or Bell's creeks are permanent water sources so this interpretation of the name appears plausible.

=== Government Depot Site, Rooty Hill ===
From 1802 until about 1815, the site of the Bungarribee estate was included within the 38,728 acres that made up the much larger Rooty Hill Government Farm (although Godden Mackay Logan, 2009b, 7 says the area was 17,000 acres). Established by Governor Philip Gidley King to ensure the supply of good pasture for government herds. King saw the farms (there were four large farm sites in the Sydney area in total) also as a way to keep the fledgling colonial economy out of the exclusive hands of profiteers and market manipulators.

The farm remained unaltered from its natural state, save for an overseer's hut and scattered huts for convict shepherds and labourers, as well as stockyards and fences to enclose grazing areas, until 1810 when the-then Governor Lachlan Macquarie subdivided the farms into smaller parcels of land for free settlers. Macquarie also believed that the worst was over for the colony in terms of food production and that the need for large Government Farms to supply the colony was no longer so pronounced. At Rooty Hill much of the development was to the north-west of the (later Bungarribee farm estate) although fencing may have been erected within its area.

Among the settlers was John Campbell of Argylshire, Scotland who is mentioned in the Colonial Secretary's Papers on 8 February 1822 as having taken possession of two thousand acres in the district of Prospect. The Land and Stock Muster of this same year records that Campbell's estate included "2000 acres at Parramatta with 130 acres cleared, 15 acres of wheat, 5 acres of barley and 2 acres of potatoes".

The estate, was bounded by Eastern Creek in the west, the existing Bungarribee Road in the north, what is now the Great Western Highway in the south, and the approximate line of Reservoir Road in the east.

=== John Kingdon Cleeve ===
John Kingdon Cleeve (1803–1883) purchased Bungarribee in 1851. He died in 1883, with the property remaining part of his estate until sold off. Both father and son, served as trustees of St. Bartholomew's Church of England, Prospect, NSW, where members of this family are buried.

=== John Campbell ===
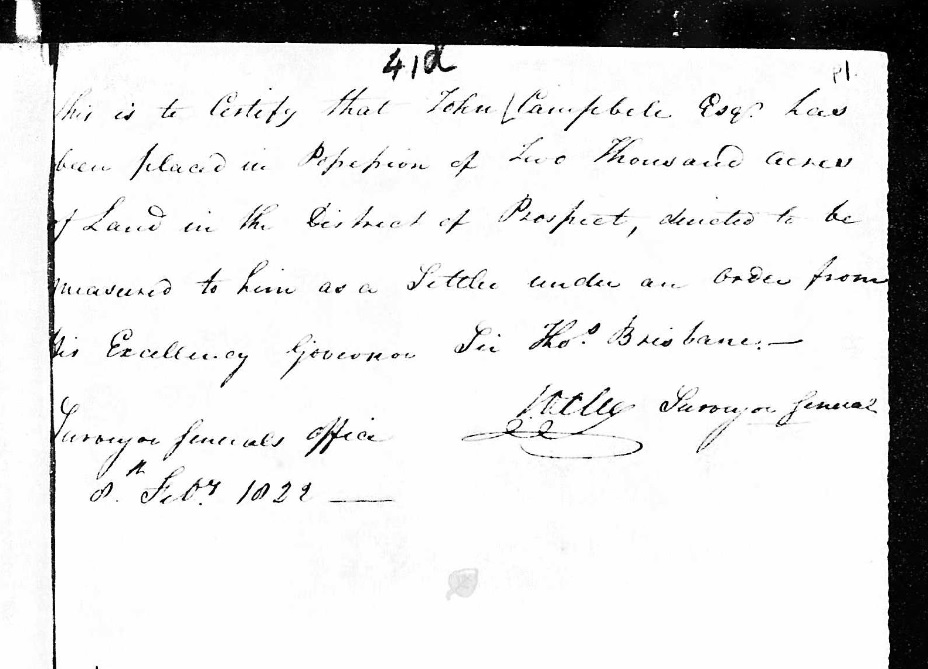
An excerpt from the 1822 Colonial Secretary's Papers where mention is made of John Campbell.

From c. 1815 Macquarie began to grant parcels of land from the Rooty Hill Farm to settlers, which marked the beginning of organised European agricultural activity in the area. The largest portion in the subject area was that of John Campbell's 2000 acres which he took up in c. 1822.

John Campbell, a major in the British Army and for whom Bungarribee Homestead was built, arrived in Sydney on 30 November 1821 with his wife, Annabella, and their nine children aboard a sailing ship called the Lusitania. A son, Charles James Fox Campbell, became one of the first European settlers in Adelaide, South Australia. Campbell, accompanied by his wife and nine children and bearing a letter of introduction from the Earl of Bathurst (then Secretary of State) to Governor Macquarie, was intent on making his fortune by taking up land and farming. A great-grand grandson, Sir Walter Campbell, would later become a judge of the Supreme Court of Queensland, chancellor of the University of Queensland, and Governor of Queensland.

No more than four months after their arrival a notice of caution appeared in the classifieds section of the Sydney Gazette, undersigned by Campbell and his neighbour Mr Robert Crawford, asking for the immediate removal of all cattle grazing on "the farms of Armady and Milton, situate on the East Creek, in the District of Prospect … having been lately marked off and located to [Campbell and Crawford]".

Despite being described by Broadbent (1997) as an "unappealing man" and an "unconscionable self-interested sponger", Campbell appears to have had considerable knowledge of farming and was relatively highly regarded by the colonial government at the time. Campbell's knowledge and status are reflected in his appointments as a committee member of the Agricultural Society of NSW (1822) and later "Joint Commissioner of Crown Lands"

Campbell's land grant was bounded by Eastern Creek in the west, in the north by the current Bungarribee Road (and its line west of Doonside Road), in the south by the Great Western Highway and in the east by the approximate line of Reservoir Road. Campbell erected a temporary residence on the high point of his land and began to clear and cultivate, with the help of 22 convict labourers.

An 1821 Colonial Secretary's record notes authorising John Campbell to select 22 convicts, 'having 80 acres cleared at Prospect under conditions of the notice of 17 November 1821. "Until the party have hutted themselves at a central spot on your estate (he says less than one week) they are to continue drawing rations from Parramatta...".

The 1822 Land and Stock Muster lists John Campbell as granted 2000 acres (at "Parramatta") with 130 acres cleared, 15 acres wheat, 5 acres barley and 2 acres potatoes. Stock are 24 cattle, 28 hogs and 1 horse. In the General Muster of 1822 he is no. A03201 with sons 3202, -03, also wife No. A3178 and 6 children 3179–3184, all "came free" on "Lusitania". He was assigned 6 convicts for 6 months victualling from the King's Stores, and applied for 5 mechanics and 4 labourers.

Between March 1822 and July 1824 Campbell consolidated his landholdings and renamed the estate "Bungarribee", which at the time was understood to mean the burial place of an Aboriginal king. This has subsequently been disproven and the word 'Bungarribee' is now thought to have been derived from two Darug words which together can be translated to mean 'creek with cockatoos' or 'creek with campsite'.

Almost immediately after Campbell received his grant he began building a homestead on that land "suited to his status as a former officer and colonial gentleman". The homestead and estate (a grant of 2000 acres between Prospect and Rooty Hill) were named Bungarabee which was also the name of the creek which cut east-west through the grant. It is an Aboriginal composition, a derivation of which was briefly associated with the Black Town native school. He built on the western slope of Bungarribee Hill (on an elevated plateau above the 100 year flood line) in 1822. Construction work utilised assigned convict labour and was preceded by or occurred in concert with clearing sections of the natural vegetation on Campbell's land. The main portion of the house was circular, with one room on the ground floor and one above, both a full circle in shape. Thus all windows, doors and mantelpieces had to be curved, and the difficulty of properly carrying out such accurate work with the labour available must have been very great. Yet it was done, and stood for over 100 years, testimony to the skill involved.

Campbell's temporary residence was enlarged in 1825 and incorporated into his grand new home. He positioned his new house on the top of the highest hill on the property, with the main living section facing to the west, providing views to the Blue Mountains in the distance. Situated on the highest point, the house was clearly visible to travellers passing along the Western Road and in time it became a landmark in the area. (Although now demolished, the site retains its landmark qualities through the bunya pine (Araucaria bidwillii), hoop pine (Araucaria cunninghamii), Mediterranean cypress / pencil pine (Cupressus sempervirens), Port Jackson fig (Ficus rubiginosa) and peppercorn tree (Schinus molle var. areira) that remain on the site and are visible from Doonside Road and were part of the Bungarribee house garden.). As well as the house, a number of large outbuildings and farm structures were erected on the raised area, including a brick convict barracks, a large brick barn, a number of stables, blacksmith's shop, carpenter's shop and other associated buildings.

The first recorded mention of a kitchen (vegetable and fruit) garden at Bungarribee appears in a sale notice for the estate following Campbell's death, who had established the property in 1823. An auction notice for the estate in The Sydney Gazette and New South Wales Advertiser from August 1828 until its sale in September 1828 described the property as including "a garden consisting of 8 acres with a great number and variety of young fruit trees well watered". Of interest is the description of the trees as "young fruit trees", suggesting at least part of the garden was a recent addition (although at this stage none of the garden would have been over five years old). The size at 8 acres represents two types of garden likely to have been on site: the kitchen garden itself and an associated orchard. A garden of that size would be able to support the entire household, staff and convict labourers on the site. A letter in the Maitland Mercury and Hunter River General Advertiser of 23 March 1846 reported that 63 people lived at Bungarribee (during the occupancy of the East India Company). This probably represents roughly the number employed on the estate throughout the 1830s. A workforce this large goes some way to explaining why the garden would cover an area as large as 8 acres. A second sale notice from 1882 also mentions the existence of a kitchen and flower garden, vineyard and orchard, but gives no further description of plantings or size

The problems encountered by Campbell during the construction of the estate were considerable. In 1824 approximately one year after beginning work on Bungarribee, Campbell was in debt to his creditors including Simon Levey and John Macarthur.

Campbell was appointed a magistrate for the district, and in those days this was a real distinction. Governor Brisbane, Macquarie's successor, on one occasion found it necessary to give some samples of the penalties inflicted by various magistrates, and he quoted one wherein Mr Campbell figured. The bench consisted of Lieutenant William Lawson, of Prospect (Veteran Hall), Donald Macleod, and John Campbell, Esquires. Christopher Lawler, a convict employed at Rooty Hill, was the culprit, and was charged with 'having a quart tin in his possession stolen from the Huts on Mr Campbell's farm.' Lawler was sentenced to receive 25 lashes every second morning until he produced the remainder of the property stolen. This was evidently a customary sentence, as others are cited, but Lawler evidently would not or could not produce the remainder, for a note states that after receiving 100 lashes he was returned to his gang.

In November 1826, it was reported that Annabella Campbell died at Bungarribee "after a severe indisposition". Her death was followed less than twelve months later by that of her husband on 10 October 1827, at the age of 56, also at the homestead. Both are buried in the grounds of the Old St John's Church in Parramatta. Their tragic deaths and the invention of Chief Bungaroo and other stories involving the murder of a convict and the firearm suicide of an officer in one of the bedrooms led to a proliferation of stories about the house being cursed or haunted.

=== Thomas Icely ===
Bungarribee was sold to Thomas Icely in 1828 for 3652 pounds with financial assistance from John Macarthur. Icely arrived in NSW on the Surrey in 1820, and within five years had an estimated capital of over 30,000 pounds.

Icely made extensive purchases of horses, cattle and sheep, and was given a grant of land to the extent of 2560 acres in the Carcoar district. The estate which was increased by purchases, was named Coombing Park after a creek on the station. Here Icely prospered and became one of the leading pastoralists of the day.

Bungarribee was used for breeding and fattening purposes. In the days before the advent of the railway, moving stock or wool was a slow and laborious business. The roads of the day were little more than tracks, and a full day's journey by bullock wagon would be covered by a truck in less than an hour now. In such circumstances such an estate as Bungarribee, adjacent to Sydney, would be of great value as an appendage to a pastoral property in the country.

Icely was owner during EJH Knapp's 1832 survey, and is listed as a horse breeder (noting that ge sold it in 1832). The large stables shown by Knapp in 1832 may have been built by Icely, who was a noted horse breeder. The 1828 Muster showed Icely had 14,770 acres, including 1230 cleared and 138 cultivated. He had 65 horses, 1450 cattle and 7500 sheep (compared to John Campbell's record in the 1822 Muster of having only one horse but 24 cattle and 28 hogs).

The 1832 Knapp survey of Eastern Creek and north boundaries of the 2000 acres of property transferred from Campbell to Icely. This showed in some detail the house, outbuildings (stables, dairy and barracks?), also extensive formal gardens covering 120 x 100 meters. Knapp was government surveyor. His plan is the only known plan that shows the outline and dimensions of the kitchen garden and positions it in relation to the house. The plan shows a rectangular garden divided internally into 16 individual beds with what appear to be paths running in a grid pattern through it. Around the perimeter appears a border, which may also represent border plantings. A central path running north-south has three circular features with smaller garden beds in the centre. This plan is similar to ideas for kitchen garden planting being put forward by the likes of Thomas Shepherd (Sydney's first commercial nurseryman and garden designer) and Scottish/English writer John Claudius Loudon at this time, although it is further from the house than they recommended. This is probably due to the site's topography, with the house and associated outbuildings built on a raised, relatively narrow portion of the site while the garden was located to the northwest, on a flat adjacent to one of the creeks that ran through the estate. The garden is shown in a number of other media (sic), most notably two paintings of the estate during the ownership of the East India Company. Of these, it is most clearly shown in T. Rider's painting of the site c. 1850 which (looking to the homestead group across the estate), shows the garden enclosed by a timber railing fence, separated from the house by a large paddock.

=== Charles Smith ===
Charles Smith, a thoroughbred horse breeder, resided at Bungarribee from 1832 to 1840. A tenant during Charles Smith's ownership was Mr Henry Herman Kater (1840–41), who arrived in NSW in 1839 on the "Euphrates", which he had chartered and loaded with horses and cattle. He was a Cambridge graduate, and had acted as one of the Earl of Marshal's Gold Staff Officers at Queen Victoria's coronation. He bought Bungarribee soon after arrival, and pastured his valuable livestock there. Amongst the horses were Capapie, Tross, Cantab, Paraquay, The Giggler and Georgiana, from which descended many of the finest racehorses in Australia. Kater decided to specialise in horse breeding, and sold his cattle to Mr William Suttor of Bathurst, thus helping to form the celebrated herd built up by Suttor.

In 1840 Kater brought his bride to Bungarribee, Eliza Charlotte Darvall, daughter of Major Edward Darvall, and on 20 September 1841 a son was born, named Henry Edward. Kater Jr became a well known pastoralist, and was appointed a member of the Legislative Council, and died in 1924.

In late 1841 Kater departed Bungarribee, and Smith leased the property to Joseph Armstrong. He came from the strata of society where families are not discussed, and any imprints he had did not come from a university. Nevertheless Smith was a remarkable man, wealthy, and a great sportsman. He was described as 'one of the greatest promoters of horses breeding, a sporting butcher, who carries on his trade in a large plot of land where Kidman's and Lassetter's stores are (George, Market & York Streets), but taking in the whole square into York Street. Smith was an eminent horse breeder and was a frequent winner. He had a stud farm at Bungarribee, and an establishment at Camperdown. He owned more blood stock of the highest type than any other breeder at the one time'. Smith died in 1845, and Bungarribee passed into the occupation of agents of the East India Company, who used it as a depot for horses intended for remounts in India.

=== East India Company and various late twentieth century owners ===
The property was occupied by the East India Company between c. 1843-6) and from 1846 to 1851 by Benjamin Boyd, prominent colonial merchant and entrepreneur. Boyd used its convict barracks for a period as accommodation for South Pacific (Kanaka) labour he had working on his properties.

It then passed through a number of tenants, one being Captains Dallas and Apperley, who used the property as an assembly depot and "rest station" for horses purchased in NSW as remounts for the British army in India. After the East India Company there seems to have been a return to horse breeding, cattle grazing, agriculture and dairying.

An 1846 record (Lt. Col. Godfrey C Mundy), notes Bungarabee (sic) as the H.E.I (East India) Company stud establishment (just on the eve of abolition)...and consisting of an excellent dwelling house and offices, stables permanent and temporary for several hundred horses, with some fine open paddocks around them...'. Other records imply that Icely and Kater both used the horse stud from which the East India Company exported late in the 1840s.

J.K. Cleeve bred and raced horses.

Bungarribee House itself eventually passed into the hands of a Thomas Cleaver and during WWII the American Air force built a sealed runway on the property which was used as an emergency training ground.

The modification and change in function of some structures appears to have been a feature of the second half of the nineteenth century.

A 1935 article described Bungarribee as 'with its burden of a century's life, standing like a battered old man, calmly awaiting the call that will write "finis" in its history.

=== Commonwealth and military ownership ===
In c. 1941, the Bungarribee estate, excluding the house, as well as properties adjoining the estate, was resumed by the Commonwealth for use by the military. The house and land to the east of Eastern Creek (which bisects the property north-south) remained in the possession of the last private owner of the site, Thomas Cleaver. The military's interest in the site was for the construction of an airfield to serve as the training site and as an overshoot runway for the nearby RAAF Station Schofields airbase. A runway was constructed of compressed gravel with aircraft hides and taxi ways to the south. The runway extended on the southern side of Bungarribee Creek, in a south-westerly direction from close to the junction of Eastern and Bungarribee Creeks, crossing Doonside Road and ending near McCormack Street (Arndell Park), approximately 1.8 km in length. Following the war's end, the estate remained in Commonwealth ownership, with the Cleaver family continuing to run dairy cattle on the northern portion.

In 1949, the Historic Buildings Committee of the Royal Australian Institute of Architects recommended that the house should be immediately "restored" in recognition of its significance.

A 1951 aerial photo shows the house and stables in accordance with Knapp's record, but later smaller buildings as well. Some trees on this photo still exist. Walter's letter (Appendix V) may relate to some outbuildings of 1913, standing in 1951). The same photo also shows the full extent of the American 1942 runway of 1500 metres sealed length. On inspection much of the sealed pavement has been broken, but it is an interesting residual artifact.

=== Overseas Telecommunications Commission ownership and demolition ===
The Overseas Telecommunications Commission acquired the site, though Godden Mackay Logan note it as 1949, and one local map has a notation "Commonwealth Gazette", 13 October 1949 re resumption of site. The OTC developed it for a new international transmitting communications station. This work, including the construction of staff housing, had no bearing on the demolition of the house in 1957 or surviving outbuildings in the early 1970s. The house with the exception of the barn and meat house was demolished in 1957.

By this time it had been unoccupied for a number of years and was deemed beyond repair. Despite some local opposition and a campaign by the fledgling National Trust for its retention and restoration, it was demolished. The only structure to survive was the two-storey brick barn, which OTC used for storage.

John Lawson, a member of the local historical society had offered to restore the house at his own expense, only to be turned down by OTC. Lawson was required to level the site, not grade the foundations. As such, partial remains survive. The most undisturbed of these are the kitchen and servants' wing. To the south of the barracks and barn sites, OTC built staff housing during the mid 1950s, behind the site of the barn along Doonside Road along the Bungarribee driveway. At the intersection of Doonside and Douglas Roads, the remains of these and the garden plantings can still be seen today.

By the 1990s, telecommunication technology had surpassed the need for radio transmitting and the OTC site was closed. The station buildings and aerial masts had been removed by 2001.

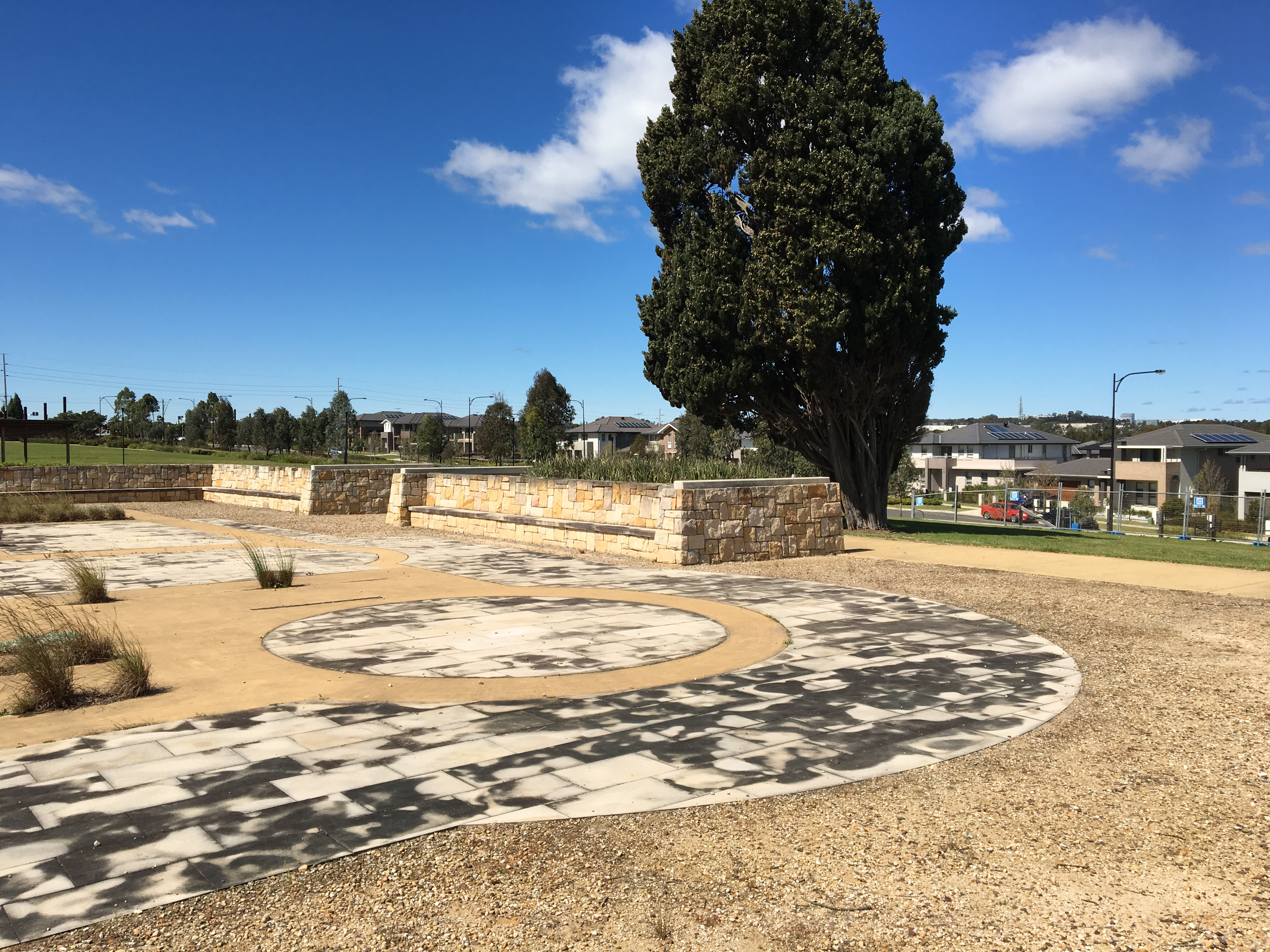
Footings of the homestead, 2016

Archaeological test excavations were undertaken in June 2000. The removal of the top layer of grass and vegetation revealed the remaining homestead walls, floor surfaces and footings. The wall foundations and verandah footings have a maximum dimension of 38 m along the east–west axis and 22.5 m along the north–south axis. As described in the historic records, the homestead featured "a two-storied, circular conical roofed tower with two single storey verandah wings radiating from it" – an L-shaped house with a drum at the junction of the two arms. The exposure of the homestead footprint clearly revealed the "drum" of the building and the two wings which radiated in a west-to-east and north-to-south direction respectively. Clearly evident around the drum and two wings of the homestead is the sandstone alignment for the verandah. Also revealed are the servants' area (which appears to include the base of a kitchen fireplace/wood stove) and a cement or line washed brick floor (which may have been part of the laundry or scullery area). The stone cobbled flooring of an early outbuilding and the barracks to the rear of the house were also located. In addition to structural remains, there was cultural material lying on the surface, including glass and ceramic fragments and other European domestic artefacts.

Locations for the cellars, large enclosed stockyards, piggery, store, ham house, stable, carpenter and blacksmiths' shop and tennis court have not yet been found, although it is expected given the high level of preservation in the main house that remains of these structures will also be present.

Above ground are remnants of the former garden of Bungarribee estate, with landmark mature coniferous trees including bunya pine (Araucaria bidwillii), hoop pine (A.cunninghamii) and Mediterranean cypress or pencil pine, (Cupressus sempervirens) indicating the location of the former homestead on the site.

OTC occupied the Bungarribee estate from 1949 until c. 2001, although the station ceased operations during the 1990s. The development of the OTC site involved the building of a modern two-storey transmitting station to the south of Bungarribee Creek and erection of a series of aerials across the entire land holding for transmitting radio signals. The new OTC station was accessed via the Great Western Highway, west of Doonside Road. It was officially opened by the Postmaster-General in February 1957. To the north of Bungarribee house site, on Doonside Road, an area was also developed for staff housing, with a curving access road, street plantings and dwelling houses. The housing was designed by prominent architectural firm Hennessy, Hennessy & Co. which OTC commissioned for the housing and the transmitting station (as well as the Receiving Station and accompanying accommodation at Bringelly).

=== Recent developments ===
c.2005 aerial photographs of the property in context show the OTC staff housing has been removed, while its layout and tree plantings survive.

In September 2015 Environment Minister Mark Speakman announced approval of the lease of a 16.5-ha site for a new zoo on land adjoining Bungarribee's picnic area and playground. The new zoo – subsequently known as the Sydney Zoo – was due to open in late 2017 and attract about 745,000 visitors a year. It was subsequently delayed until early 2019.

In March 2017 Western Sydney Parklands' $15 million Bungarribee Park was opened, making it the largest recreational space in Western Sydney since the construction of Homebush's Bicentennial Park. It provided for the wetland around Bungarribee and Eastern creeks to be protected, with 20 hectares of native wildflower and thousands of native trees will be planted to restore the Cumberland Plain.

=== Modifications and dates ===
- 1821 – 50 acres cleared at Prospect
- 1822 – 2000 acres (at "Parramatta") with 130 acres cleared, 15 acres wheat, 5 acres barley and 2 acres potatoes. Also the initial construction of house
- 1828 – Muster showed Icely had 14,770 acres, including 1230 cleared and 138 cultivated.
- 1832 – survey of property showed in some detail the house, outbuildings (stables, dairy and barracks?), also extensive formal gardens covering 120 x 100 meters.
- 1846 – record (Lt.Col. Godfrey C Mundy, notes Bungarabee (sic: Campbell's spelling form) as the H.E.I (East India) Company stud establishment (just on the eve of abolition)...and consisting of an excellent dwelling house and offices, stables permanent and temporary for several hundred horses, with some fine open paddocks around them...'.
- 1913 – the estate east of present-day Doonside Road was subdivided off. Outbuildings were erected?/noted by then-owner Walters. Also noted that 'the only buildings beside the residence are an old brick house men's quarters, large brick barn with 10 loose boxes round it, brick dairy and brick and wood vehicle house'.
- 1942 – resumed by military. American runway of 1500 metres sealed length for use as a training site and as an overshoot runway for the nearby Schofields airbases.
- 1951 – aerial photo shows house and stables, and later smaller buildings as well. Some trees on this photo still exist. Also shows indications of garden walkways, dams or waterholes and trees. The two "waterholes?" shown by Knapp (in 1832) ) (about 14m south of the garden) are shown about 12 m apart and the 1982 map indicates them on the south side of the dam centred at 02670E 60360 N.
- 1980 – aerial photo showed indications of garden walkways, dams or waterholes and trees. The two "waterholes?" shown by Knapp (in 1832) (about 14m south of the garden) may still be visible.
- 2012 – 18 August – A bunya pine trunk failed 2 m above ground level after a period of high winds, snapping off. It turned out to have termite riddled core and little live wood. The stump was subsequently removed and ground out. A replacement bunya pine was planted in the same location.

== Description ==
=== Site/former farm ===
The site sits within the former Overseas Telecommunications Commission (OTC) Transmitting Station site at Doonside. The Eastern Boundary of the Bungarribee Homestead Complex is Doonside Road at Douglas Road and the heritage curtilage extends for an area approximately 2.6 by 1.6 km. It is part of an original grant of 2000 acres received by John Campbell on 30 June 1823. The grant was bounded on the north by a line bearing east 180 chains 50 links commencing at Eastern Creek, on the east side by a line bearing south 150 chains to the Great Western Road, on the south by that road and on the west by Eastern Creek.

The archaeological potential of the site was reported as extremely high as at 10 July 2000, as the site consists of the rare, largely intact footings of an 1820s homestead including main house, outbuilding, barracks and original garden plantings.

The archaeological footprint of the complex is largely intact. It is expected to contain some occupation deposits relating to all phases of occupation on the site. The original vegetation (including large plantings) is largely intact.

=== Garden and grounds ===
Above ground are remnants of the former garden of Bungarribee estate, with landmark mature coniferous trees including bunya pine (Araucaria bidwillii), hoop pine (A.cunninghamii), Mediterranean cypress or pencil pine, (Cupressus sempervirens), Port Jackson fig (Ficus rubiginosa), Himalayan blue pine (Pinus wallichiana) and peppercorn tree (Schinus molle var. areira) and boxthorn, (Lycium ferocissimum) indicating the location of the former homestead garden and possible former farm hedging on the site. An 1832 Knapp survey showed a square 8-acre formal kitchen garden north-west of the homestead site and other records note an orchard area from the time of the Campbells and into the 1830s

=== Homesteads ===
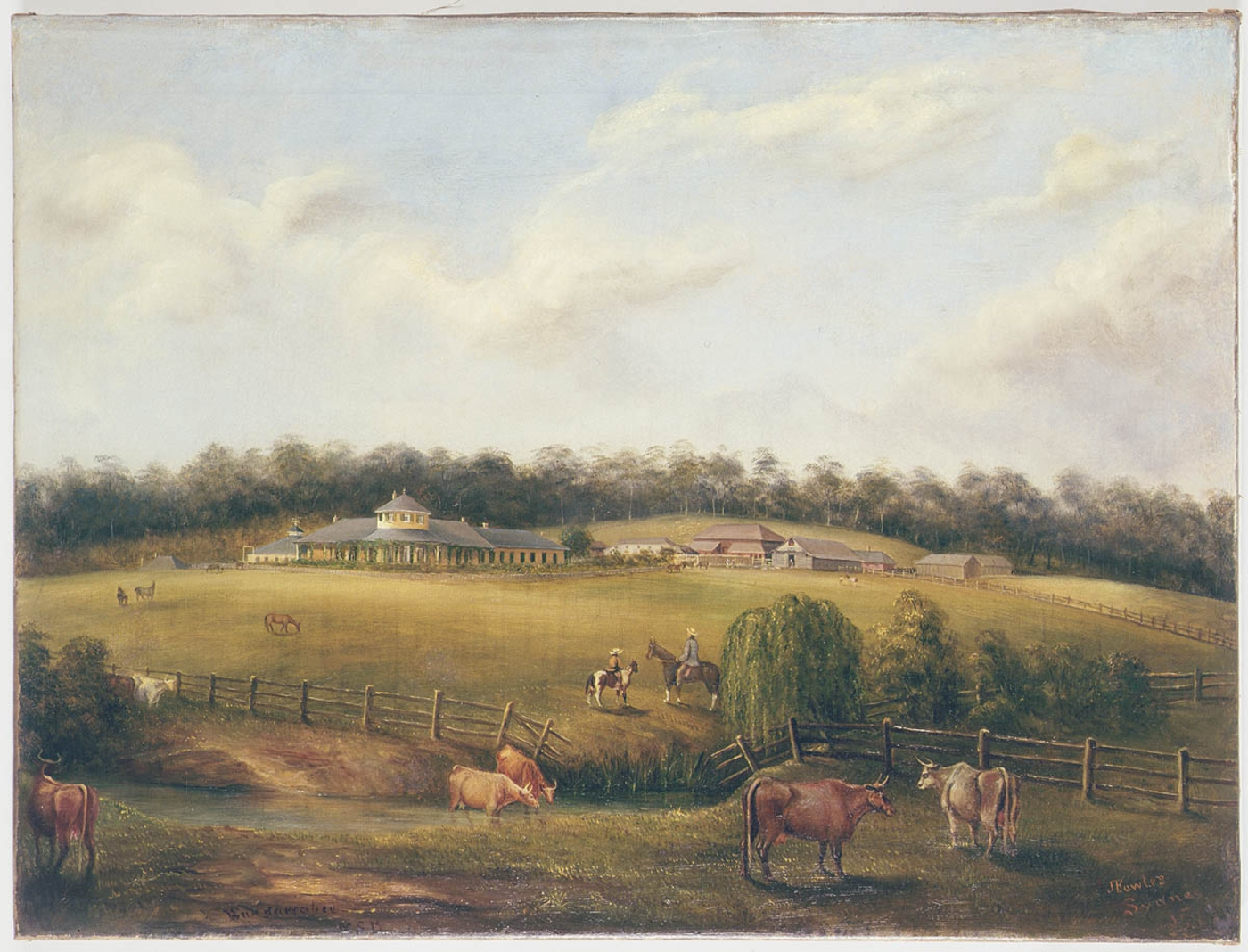
A view of the Bungarribee estate and homestead from 1858.

Bungarribee Homestead was a historic house near Eastern Creek, New South Wales built for Colonel John Campbell between 1822 and 1828. The homestead, which was acquired by the Overseas Telecommunications Commission (OTC) and demolished in 1957, gained a reputation for being "possibly Australia's most haunted house". The former location of the homestead is now on a heritage-listed archaeological site.

Campbell built a temporary dwelling on the property in c.1822, prior to building the main house, which was started by 1825. The temporary residence was later incorporated into the main dwelling as the servants' quarters.

The homestead was not completed in the lifetimes of either John or Annabella Campbell. At the time Campbell's estate was cleared in February 1828, Bungarribee still comprised 2,000 acres and was advertised as including a house "scarcely completed at Mr Campbell's death, [consisting] of a dining room and five bedrooms on the ground floor, and four small rooms in the upper storey". The conical-roofed tower, a defining feature of the house in subsequent decades, was not completed at the time of the auction and was most likely finished during the ownership of the Icely family from October 1828 until May 1832.

The main house featured a two-storey, circular conical roofed tower with two single story verandah wings radiating from it in an L shape. Historical accounts note that the walls of the two-storey circular section were solid and constructed of soft red sandstock bricks from Parramatta/Prospect. The one-storey walls of the radiating wings and the internal walls were of half timber – post and rail – with sandstock bricks forming the infill panels of the walls. Window and door openings throughout the house were spanned by timber lintels and the solid brick portions of the house also featured decorative flat and semi-circular brick arches. Vertical lathes were nailed to the rails on the external walls which were ultimately finished in white washed stucco. The roof structure and floors were built of adzed and pit sawn timber joined with handmade iron nails and the roof itself was covered with shingles. The open colonnaded verandahs and halls features sandstone flagging and the building boasted a substantial cellar.

The main portion of the house was circular, with one room on the ground floor and one above, both a full circle in shape. Thus all windows, doors and mantelpieces had to be curved, and the difficulty of properly carrying out such accurate work with the labour available must have been very great..., testimony to the skill involved.

The main ground floor living rooms featured glazed French doors, opening onto the verandah. The house had 5 bedrooms on the ground floor and one in the first floor tower. It also featured formal living and dining rooms, a withdrawing room for the gentlemen, servants' quarters (in the original family cottage which was incorporated into the rear of the house) and a cellar underneath the main house accessed via an internal pantry. Later reports indicated that the cellar may have had a passage running from it towards the Bungarribee Creek and that a large underground tank or cistern was located to the rear of the main house. The house was built in the Picturesque style, which had been made popular in England by the architect John Nash in the early 19th century and had begun to appear in colonial design from the 1820s. In NSW this style never gained much attention, with more examples in Tasmania than the mainland. Bungarribee house was its most recognisable expression in New South Wales.

=== Architecture ===
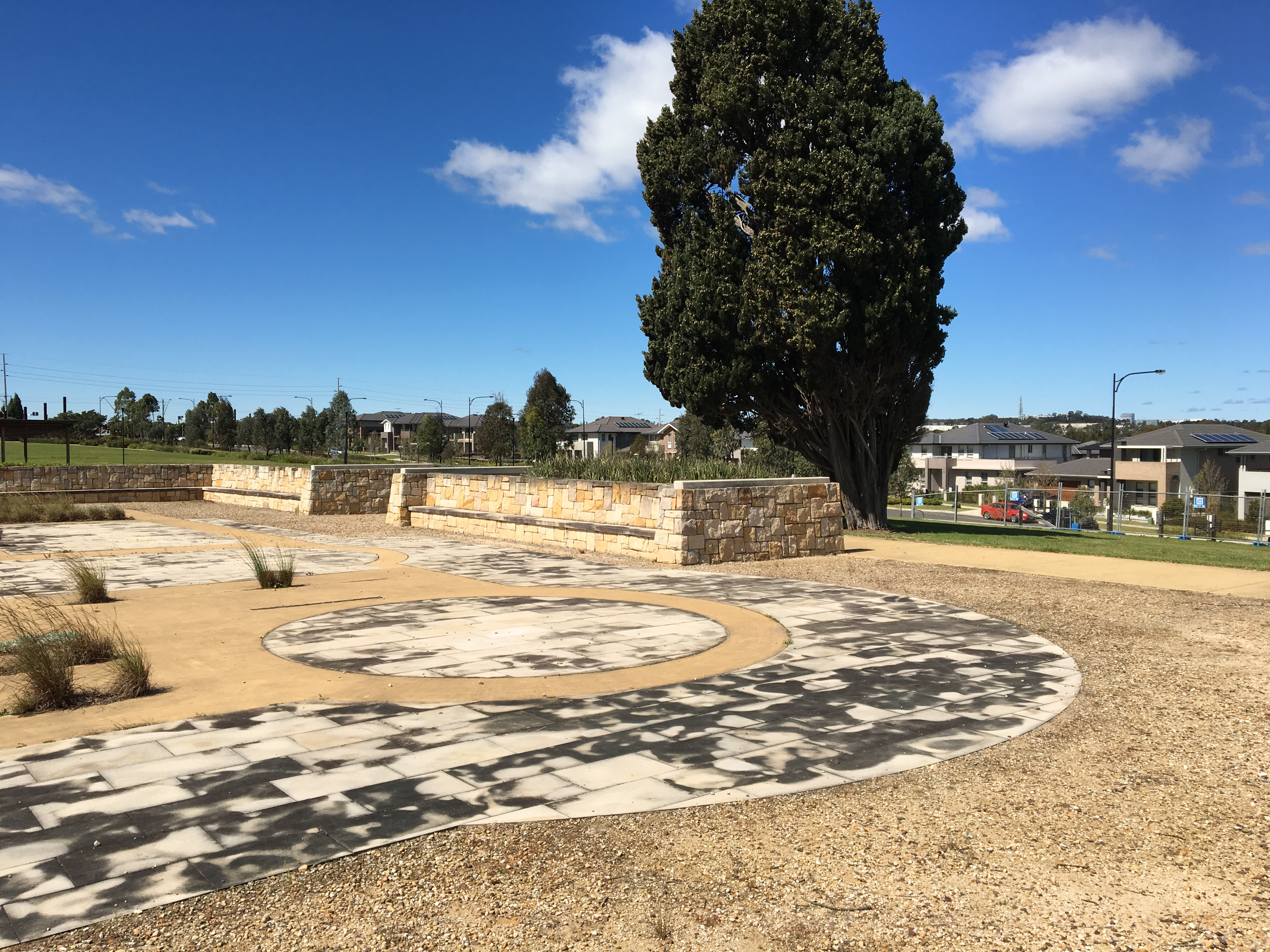
The curvature of the homestead's famous tower is still visible in Bungarribee Homestead Heritage Park.

The architect of Bungarribee Homestead remains unknown. In The Australian Colonial House, James Broadbent describes the homestead as having been "an L-shaped house with a drum at the junction of the two arms". The "drum", as Broadbent calls it, formed the base of a "circular conical-roofed tower with two single-storeyed verandahed wings radiating from it". In Lost glories : a memorial to forgotten Australian buildings, David Latta states that the tower housed a drawing room on the ground floor and that the upper level was broken into a number of smaller rooms. Due to the curvature of the walls, interior doors in the drawing room were also curved and in this way reminiscent of the foyer in the now-also demolished The Vineyard House at Rydalmere.

The overall impression of the homestead, from its carriageway at least, was that it was "one of the most charming houses built in early colonial New South Wales". A 1932 description of the homestead states that "all the ground floors opened upon stone flagged verandahs, originally draped with trailing roses and creepers. On two sides was an old garden with a carriage drive, and on one side in the midst of a little lawn stood a true lover's tryst, an old sundial".

Recognised from some distance away by its tower, as well as being romanticised for its "simple and stately style of humble execution, of broad wall surfaces and long colonnaded verandahs", the house was in fact "a strange hybrid piece of geometry, a semi cylinder married to a triangular prism" that had been designed to some extent around the need for a staircase to its upper level. Subtly Italianate in style, the house has been recognised as being among the earliest influences on the development of the cottage orné style in colonial Australian architecture.

The footings and floor surfaces of the homestead were unearthed during archaeological test excavations in June 2000. Prior to this, the site of the homestead had been marked by above ground remnants of the former garden including bunya pine (Araucaria bidwillii), hoop pine (Araucaria cunninghamii) and pencil pine (Cupressus sempervirens). The site has been subsequently incorporated into a public reserve called Heritage Park within the Sydney suburb of Bungarribee.

=== Outbuildings ===
As well as the house, a number of large outbuildings and farm structures were erected on the raised area, including a brick convict barracks, a large, brick barn, a number of stables, blacksmith's shop, carpenter's shop and other associated buildings.

The barn, which appears to have been huge, was located to the east of the house and was a solid brick building built from clay stocks interlaced with hard-burnt shale bricks laid in a Flemish bond. The roof of the barn featured "tusk and tenon" joinery which allowed nails to be used sparingly. The men's quarters may also have been built of the same bricks and were described as being behind the barn, having brick floors with lofts above where the servants used to sleep.

The modification and change in function of some structures appears to have been a feature of the second half of the nineteenth century.

OTC acquired the site to develop a communications station in 1950. OTC built staff housing there during the 1950s, the remains of which can still be seen on site today along with their garden plantings.

Archaeological test excavations were undertaken in June 2000. The removal of the top layer of grass and vegetation revealed the remaining homestead walls, floor surfaces and footings. The wall foundations and verandah footings have a maximum dimension of 38 m along the east–west axis and 22.5 m along the north–south axis. As described in the historic records, the homestead featured "a two-storeyed, circular conical roofed tower with two single storey verandah wings radiating from it" – an L-shaped house with a drum at the junction of the two arms.

The exposure of the homestead footprint clearly revealed the "drum" of the building and the two wings which radiated in a west to east and north to south direction respectively. Clearly evident around the drum and two wings of the homestead is the sandstone alignment for the verandah. Also revealed are the servants' area (which appears to include the base of a kitchen fireplace/wood stove) and a cement or line washed brick floor (which may have been part of the laundry or scullery area. The stone cobbled flooring of an early outbuilding (whitewashed building with half-storey, west of the barn – ref. J. Fowles 1858) and the convict barracks to the rear of the house were also located. In addition to structural remains, there was cultural material lying on the surface, including glass and ceramic fragments and other European domestic artefacts. (These items were stated to be bagged and removed during the dig).

Locations for the cellars, large enclosed stockyards, piggery, store, ham house, stable, carpenter and blacksmiths' shop, and tennis court have not yet been found, although it is expected given the high level of preservation in the main house that remains of these structures will also be present.

The site is affected by contaminated soils. There are elevated lead levels and some asbestos present although the majority of the asbestos was removed during site remediation works in 2000.

=== Modifications and decline ===
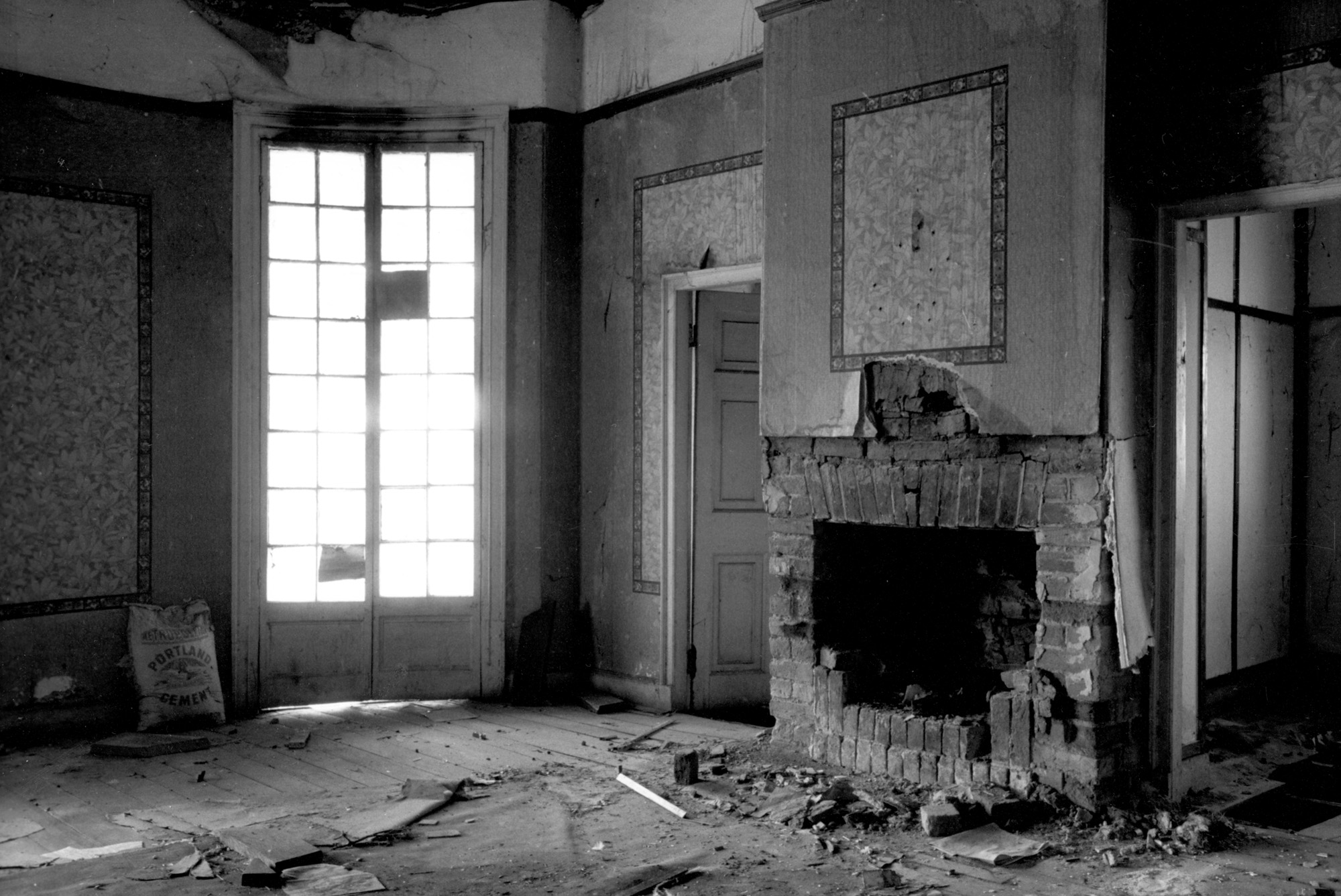
The drawing room at Bungarribee Homestead was located on the lower level of the cylindrical tower. It is pictured here only a few years before the house was demolished.

Among its more celebrated tenants were the British East India Company, who assembled horses on the property as remounts for troops in India, and also the pioneer and entrepreneur Benjamin Boyd.

During the early years of the twentieth century, the-then owner Major J. J. Walters broke the estate into smaller parcels of land but remained in residence at the homestead until the 1920s. After the departure of the Major and his family in the early 1920s, the homestead was purchased by Charles W. Hopkins who spent "a large sum" on its restoration. The date of the Hopkins restoration is unknown, however newspaper articles place these changes sometime between 1926 and 1928. In a description of the house from 1926, for instance, a journalist lamented that "neglect and changed conditions conspire with time to wreck this fine old home ... [and that] a more utilitarian age will soon demand its removal". Within a few years, however, the homestead was reported to be "greatly altered; in fact practically re-built, although the old historical features have been preserved".

There is no explanation as to why the house fell, once again, into a state of great disrepair between 1928 and 1935. Within only seven years of the celebrated Hopkins restoration, another journalist described the house as being "with its burden of a century's life, standing like a battered old man, calmly awaiting the call that will write 'finis' in its history". The condition of the homestead only worsened during the Second World War, during which time the Commonwealth had resumed the property for military purposes, and by the 1950s Bungarribee had become "an isolated wreck" on the Doonside Road. Considerable damage appears to have been done in early 1950, as recorded by students at the Sydney Technical College in December of that year. By this time, much of the homestead's interior had been destroyed and the rubble footings were beginning to sink. Photographs taken by Barry Wollaston in 1954, now kept by Historic Houses Trust of New South Wales, show that most of the windows had been broken and that the roof had begun to collapse.

O.T.C. (Overseas Telecommunication Commission) acquired the site. Local historian John Lawson offered to restore the homestead at his own expense but that offer was rejected by O.T.C.

The homestead was demolished. A two-storey brick barn survived and was used by O.T.C. for storage until demolished in 1977

== Heritage listing ==
The Bungarribee Homestead complex represents a rare, intact footprint of a very early farmstead including a main house, outbuildings and plantings. The remains, as defined by the heritage curtilage are considered to have State significance based on their historic, aesthetic, social and technical/research values.

The homestead has a strong association with settler John Campbell who arrived in the colony in 1821 seeking to increase his fortunes. Bungarribee is a reflection of the ambition of Campbell, but also of other settlers who desired a new and prosperous life. The homestead is architecturally and aesthetically significant and contributed to the influence of the "cottage ornee" style in the colony. The homestead was also an important reminder of the social status of its owners with its "Italianate tower seen across paddocks from the Western Road,... as important an architectural landmark in the colony as Mrs Macquarie's Gothic forts on Sydney Harbour".

As a cultural resource, this complex is highly significant for the potential to yield information regarding the evolving pastoral and economic activities of an early homestead in the western region of Sydney. It has the potential to yield information regarding the initial construction and occupation of the homestead, the barracks, barn and other outbuildings. This resource has the potential to provide information relating to the domestic conditions and social status of early settlers, and the working life and conditions of domestic and farm assistants employed on this estate.

Bungarribee Homestead archaeological site was listed on the New South Wales State Heritage Register on 8 December 2000 having satisfied the following criteria.

The place is important in demonstrating the course, or pattern, of cultural or natural history in New South Wales.

The historic value of the Bungarribee Homestead Complex is considered to be high.

The Bungarribee Homestead Complex has the potential to contain further substantial sub-surface cultural resources that would contribute to our current understanding of the evolving cultural history of NSW. The site has the potential to contribute information regarding the early pastoral movement and settlement into western Sydney. Specifically, the homestead complex has strong associations with John Campbell a retired military officer who arrived in the colony from Scotland in 1821. It is understood that Campbell arrived in the colony with his wife, nine children and a letter of introduction from the Earl of Bathurst to Governor Macquarie.

Like many early settlers, Campbell arrived in the colony with the intention of increasing his fortune. The Bungarribee estate is a reflection of his and future owners' ambitions and ideals. Campbell found himself in financial difficulties which threatened his ownership of Bungarribee, however due to his associations with John Macarthur, he was able to ease himself from this situation. Although Campbell died in 1827 he "left behind one of the most charming houses built in early Colonial NSW". The style of the homestead is described as "subtly Italianate" and its character "unashamedly picturesque".

The place is important in demonstrating aesthetic characteristics and/or a high degree of creative or technical achievement in New South Wales.

The aesthetic value of the Bungarribee Homestead Complex is considered to be High.

The Bungarribee Homestead Complex is significant for it sensory and architectural appeal. This appeal would undoubtedly have been evident to the historic occupants of the homestead, as it is to the present day visitor. The homestead was designed to have a panoramic view of the surrounding rural landscape. The drawing room verandah windows would have provided a western horizon highlighting the Blue Mountains. The design of the circular room or drum of the main homestead building would not only have been a feature of the home, but would also have provided and architectural feature that showcased the panoramic views of the surrounding landscape. The design of the Bungarribee verandah can also be considered to be significant in its influence of future designs of homesteads in the colony and in the establishment of the style of the "cottage orne".

Broadbent describes Bungarribee as a "delightful, sensitive and eccentric adaption of the vernacular bungalow form" and is significant in its reflection of the desire of early settlers to tame the wild landscape with designs inspired and filtered down from the "vernacular architecture of the Italian campagna". This is reflected in the location of the homestead on an elevated flat above the surrounding floodplain of Bungarribee and Eastern Creeks, which would have provided a serene and fertile setting for the early occupants of Bungarribee. The remnant historic pines also provide a reminder of the early European influence on the environmental landscape.

The place has strong or special association with a particular community or cultural group in New South Wales for social, cultural or spiritual reasons.

The social value of the Bungarribee Homestead Complex is considered to be moderate to high.

Prior to its demolition, the Bungarribee homestead was a significant landmark in the Doonside/Rooty Hill area. The site today provides many locals with a poignant reminder of the early settlement of this region of Sydney. Many locals today have childhood recollections of stories told to them by family and friends regarding the Bungarribee homestead with its grand verandah, and the large barn that once stood to the east of the home. Historically, the homestead and its pastoral activities would have provided employment as well as an economic base for the local Doonside/ Rooty Hill region.

The place has potential to yield information that will contribute to an understanding of the cultural or natural history of New South Wales.

The technical/research value of the Bungarribee Homestead Complex is considered to be high.

The Complex has the potential to yield significant information about the evolving agricultural and pastoral activities of an early homestead in the western region of Sydney. It has the potential to yield information relating to the initial construction and occupation of the homestead, as well as the barracks, barn and other outbuildings, as very little is currently understood about its construction phases. Bungarribee Homestead's long and continual occupation from its construction in 1823 to its demolition in 1957, would provide significant information relating to the changing economic status of early homesteads in rural settings. The site also has the potential to provide significant information relating to the domestic conditions and social status of early settlers, and the working life and conditions of domestic employees as well as farm assistants.

== Popular culture ==
The homestead's reputation for being haunted first appeared in print in The Cumberland Argus and Fruitgrowers Advocate in 1938. In making reference to "the famous old legend of The Bungarribee Ghost", the article provides one of the only credible indications that the house had been afforded its sinister reputation quite some time prior to this date. Although the alleged supernatural happenings at Bungarribee Homestead were not properly reported until the time of its demolition, there does exist sufficient evidence of several deaths on site that would later form the basis of more well-known accounts of hauntings at the homestead. The most widely reported of these deaths, that of Major Frederick Hovenden in 1845, has more than likely given rise to a story about the ghost of a military officer who took his own life in the iconic Bungarribee tower room. Hovenden, who was indebted to creditors and had disappeared from Sydney as much as two years earlier, was found dead in a remote corner of the estate with the words "Died of Hunger" engraved on the peak of his travelling cap. The tragic account of the man's death seems to have given rise to two far more elaborate tales about the house, both published by the Sydney Morning Herald in February 1957, in which "an officer suicided in a bedroom, bloodstaining the floor" and that of "the frightened boy ...[who] woke up in the night to feel cold hands gripping his throat" and after scooping up his clothes and rushing out of the house "walked miles for help before he could calm down".

The Ghost Guide to Australia recognises Bungarribee Homestead as one of the most haunted in Australia.
