= Electoral results for the Division of McMahon =

Australian division election results

This is a list of electoral results for the Division of McMahon in Australian federal elections from the division's creation in 2009 until the present.

== Members ==
Member	Party	Term
Chris Bowen	Labor	2010–present

== Election results ==
=== Elections in the 2020s ===
==== 2025 ====
2025 Australian federal election: McMahon
Party	Candidate	Votes	%	±%
One Nation	Melissa Janicska			
Liberal	Carmen Lazar			
Labor	Chris Bowen			
Independent	Matthew Camenzuli			
Greens	Ben Hammond			
Total formal votes				
Informal votes				
Turnout				

==== 2022 ====
2022 Australian federal election: McMahon
Party	Candidate	Votes	%	±%
Labor	Chris Bowen	40,657	47.98	+1.90
Liberal	Vivek Singha	24,006	28.33	−4.98
United Australia	Marie Saliba	7,723	9.11	+5.21
Greens	Astrid O'Neill	4,922	5.81	+0.87
One Nation	Scott Ford	4,612	5.44	−2.81
Liberal Democrats	Cameron Shamsabad	2,822	3.33	+3.33
Total formal votes		84,742	89.39	+1.47
Informal votes		10,057	10.61	−1.47
Turnout		94,799	88.42	−2.56
Two-party-preferred result
Labor	Chris Bowen	50,413	59.49	+2.85
Liberal	Vivek Singha	34,329	40.51	−2.85
Labor hold		Swing	+2.85	

Alluvial diagram for preference flows in the seat of McMahon in the 2022 federal election. indicates at what stage the winning candidate had over 50% of the votes and was declared the winner.

=== Elections in the 2010s ===
==== 2019 ====
2019 Australian federal election: McMahon
Party	Candidate	Votes	%	±%
Labor	Chris Bowen	39,351	46.08	−7.36
Liberal	Vivek Singha	28,441	33.31	+3.26
One Nation	Damian Commane	7,046	8.25	+8.25
Greens	Astrid O'Neill	4,218	4.94	−0.48
United Australia	Meg Wrightson	3,329	3.90	+3.90
Christian Democrats	Zeeshan Francis	3,008	3.52	−3.68
Total formal votes		85,393	87.92	−2.19
Informal votes		11,731	12.08	+2.19
Turnout		97,124	90.98	+1.04
Two-party-preferred result
Labor	Chris Bowen	48,364	56.64	−5.47
Liberal	Vivek Singha	37,029	43.36	+5.47
Labor hold		Swing	−5.47	

==== 2016 ====
2016 Australian federal election: McMahon
Party	Candidate	Votes	%	±%
Labor	Chris Bowen	45,979	53.44	+4.40
Liberal	George Bilic	25,855	30.05	−10.69
Christian Democrats	Milan Maksimovic	6,198	7.20	+4.43
Greens	Astrid O'Neill	4,665	5.42	+2.43
Australia First	Victor Waterson	1,797	2.09	+2.08
Independent	Fadhel Shamasha	1,544	1.79	+1.79
Total formal votes		86,038	90.11	+2.09
Informal votes		9,441	9.89	−2.09
Turnout		95,479	89.94	−3.72
Two-party-preferred result
Labor	Chris Bowen	53,442	62.11	+7.48
Liberal	George Bilic	32,596	37.89	−7.48
Labor hold		Swing	+7.48	

==== 2013 ====
2013 Australian federal election: McMahon
Party	Candidate	Votes	%	±%
Labor	Chris Bowen	41,334	50.19	−1.07
Liberal	Ray King	33,430	40.59	+4.34
Palmer United	Matthew Dobrincic	2,862	3.48	+3.48
Greens	Astrid O'Neill	2,410	2.93	−5.12
Christian Democrats	Manny Poularas	2,323	2.82	−1.62
Total formal votes		82,359	88.65	−0.51
Informal votes		10,542	11.35	+0.51
Turnout		92,901	93.57	+0.33
Two-party-preferred result
Labor	Chris Bowen	45,561	55.32	−2.49
Liberal	Ray King	36,798	44.68	+2.49
Labor hold		Swing	−2.49	

==== 2010 ====
2010 Australian federal election: McMahon
Party	Candidate	Votes	%	±%
Labor	Chris Bowen	40,933	51.26	−7.41
Liberal	Jamal Elishe	28,950	36.25	+5.29
Greens	Astrid O'Neill	6,428	8.05	+3.37
Christian Democrats	Manny Poularas	3,549	4.44	+1.72
Total formal votes		79,860	89.16	−3.24
Informal votes		9,710	10.84	+3.24
Turnout		89,570	93.25	−0.28
Two-party-preferred result
Labor	Chris Bowen	46,170	57.81	−5.96
Liberal	Jamal Elishe	33,690	42.19	+5.96
Labor notional hold		Swing	−5.96	
