= Huntingwood =

- Suburb
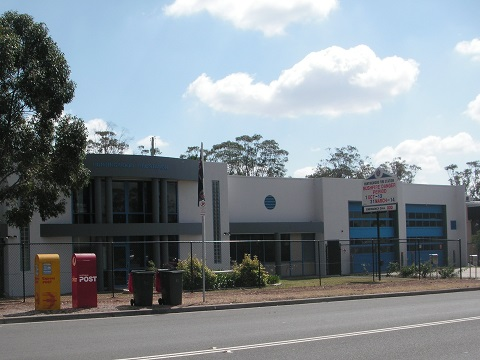
- Huntingwood Fire Station

- Interactive map of Huntingwood
- Country: Australia
- State: New South Wales
- City: Sydney
- LGA: City of Blacktown
- Location: 34 km (21 mi) west of Sydney

Government
  - State electorate: Prospect
  - Federal division: McMahon
- Elevation: 75 m (246 ft)

Population
  - Total: 3 (SAL 2021)
- Postcode: 2148
Suburbs around Huntingwood
Doonside	Arndell Park	Blacktown
Bungarribee	Huntingwood	Prospect
Eastern Creek	Eastern Creek	Prospect

Huntingwood is a predominantly industrial suburb in the City of Blacktown, in Western Sydney, in the state of New South Wales, Australia.

== Name ==
The composite name was chosen because the first English-style hunting is said to have taken place here and the 'Woods Estate', owned by the Woods family for nearly a century, is located within the suburb.

== Transport ==
The M4 and Westlink M7 motorways run through the adjacent suburbs. Given this easy access to main Sydney's main arterial road network, companies such as Coles Myer and Woolworths Group have transport and logistics complexes situated off Great Western Highway between the Wallgrove Road and Reservoir Road exists from the M4.

== Manufacturing ==
In 2014, a decision by Diageo to relocate the bottling operations of Queensland's Bundaberg Rum, to the western Sydney suburb of Huntingwood resulted in local job losses in the city that bears its name.
