= Western Sydney Parklands =

Protected area in New South Wales, Australia

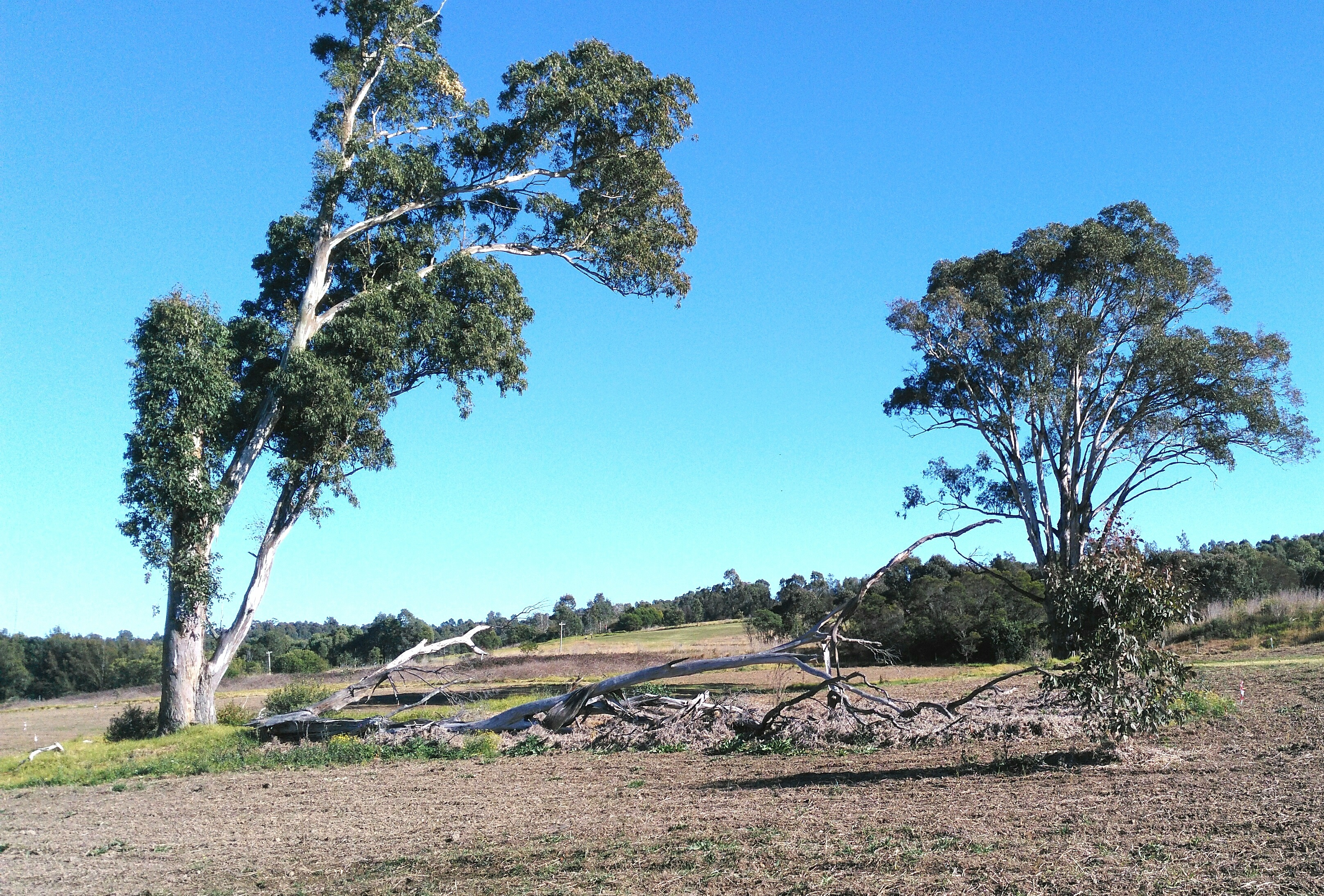
- Near The Dairy, in Abbotsbury
- Interactive map of Western Sydney Parklands
- Type: Urban park system and a nature reserve
- Location: Greater Western Sydney
- Nearest city: Blacktown; Fairfield; Liverpool
- Nearest town: Fairfield City Council, Blacktown City Council, Liverpool City Council
- Coordinates: 33°50′21″S 150°51′34″E
- Area: 5,280 hectares (13,047 acres)
- Elevation: 60–100 metres (197–328 ft)
- Created: 1968
- Opened: 2007
- Owner: Government of New South Wales
- Administrator: NSW National Parks and Wildlife Service
- Manager: Western Sydney Parklands Trust
- Visitors: 430,000–790,000 (in 2009–10)
- Open: All year
- Website: westernsydneyparklands.com.au

The Western Sydney Parklands is an urban park system and a nature reserve located in Sydney, New South Wales, Australia. The NSW government has spent around $400 million for the park. The park is governed by the NSW National Parks and Wildlife Service and is listed under the National Parks and Wildlife Act 1974. The Parklands begin in the north in the City of Blacktown, cross the City of Fairfield, and end in the City of Liverpool.

The parklands, being approximately 5,280-hectare (13,000-acre) in size and 27 kilometres (17 mi) in length, are one of the largest in the world, and they would feature picnic areas, sports grounds and walking tracks. The parklands attract 430,000 to 790,000 visitors annually. In addition, the parkland provided lands for the 2000 Olympic Games.

== History ==
The Parkland was an area of specialty for the Darug people and it is still deemed as important by the Aboriginal Land Council. The Parkland has been visited by some early settlers, such as Edward Abbott and George Johnson. The Parklands were planned in 1968, as Western Sydney needed open space and recreational areas. In the late 1970s, the northern parts of the regional park had areas for rural residential lots (near Horsley Park). In the year 2000, the parklands supplied venues for the Sydney Olympic Games. The boundaries of the park were completed in 2006. A year later, the walking and cycling track, which meander through the park, was finally finished and opened to public.

In November 2019, school students planted over 140,000 trees in the parkland to rejuvenate the critically endangered Cumberland Plain Woodland community that once predominated the Sydney region.

== Geography ==
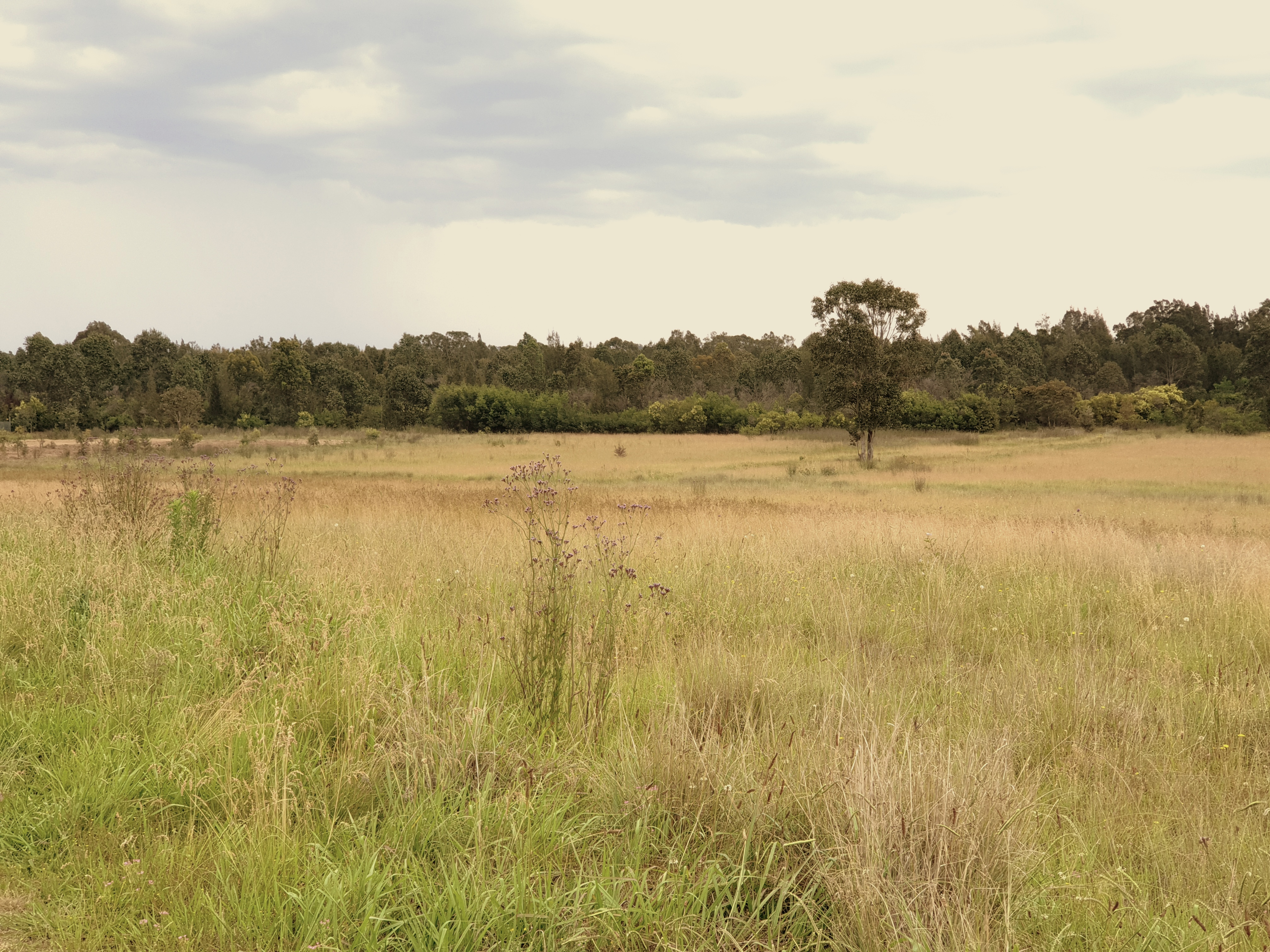
The typical savanna landscape of the parkland in Bungaribee (Blacktown)

The Parklands are formed by a series of connected green spaces, roughly following the western section of the M7 motorway and the M7 cycleway. They form an elongated shape, narrow in the east-west direction. The Parklands are bounded by the M7 motorway in the north, and begin in the suburb of Dean Park in the north, then largely follow the eastern side of the M7 motorway south to reach the M4 Western Motorway. The Parklands continue to follow the M7 motorway south, and near Cecil Hills crosses the M7 motorway to incorporate parkland on the western side of the motorway, from where it continues south, and ends in the suburb of Horningsea Park.

The park is around 27 kilometres (17 mi) long, starting from the suburb of Quakers Hill in the north, to Leppington (Liverpool) in the south. It features a conspicuous ridge that runs through it from north to south, providing panoramic views of Greater Western Sydney. Every entrance to the parkland contains prominent planting accompanied by a large signage to indicate access. The Parklands contain the headwaters of Eastern Creek, as a tributary of the Hawkesbury-Nepean. The north-south ridgeline in the Parklands is the catchment boundary between the Hawkesbury-Nepean, Georges River and Parramatta River catchments.

== Ecology ==
=== Flora ===
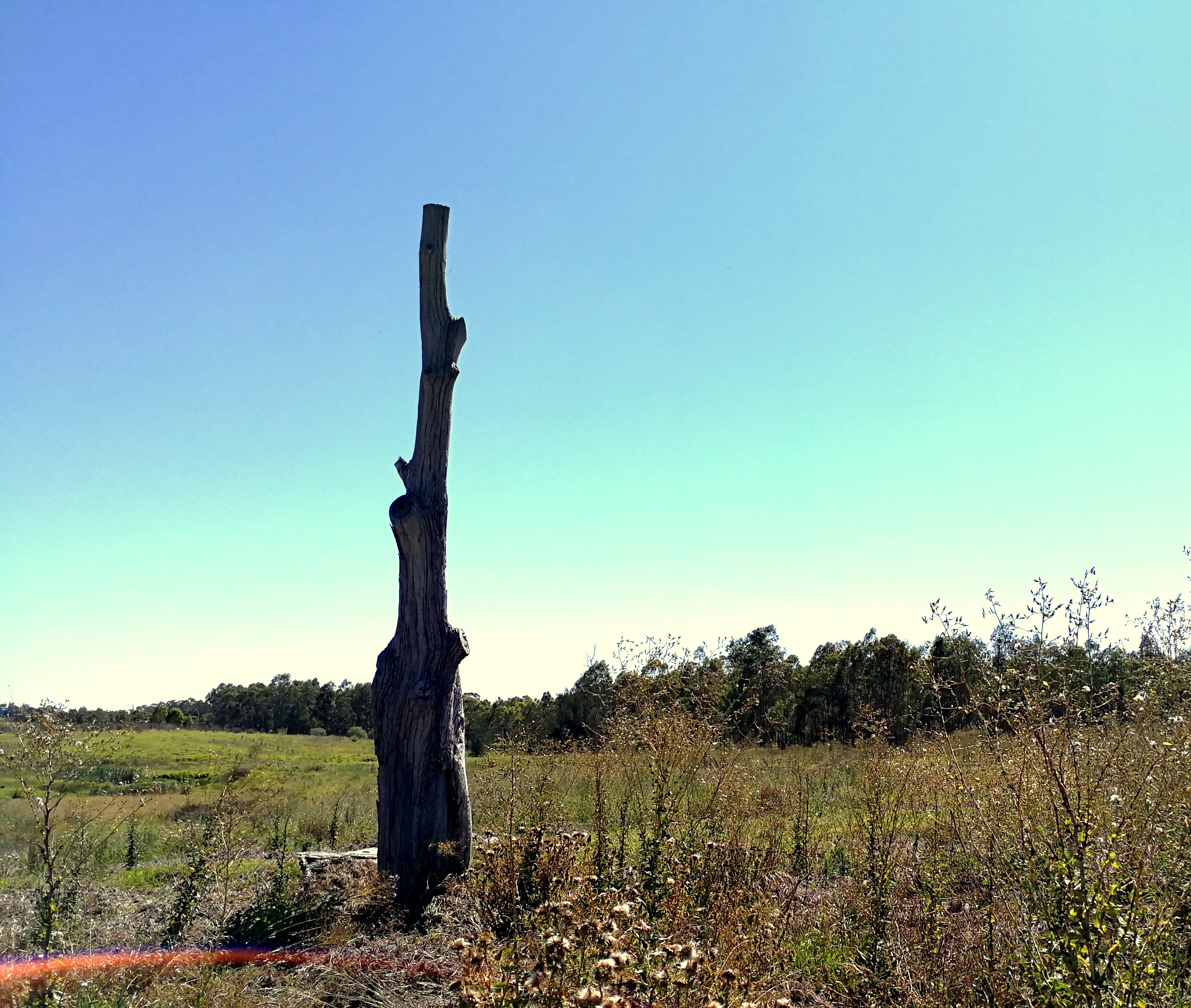
A snag

The park has around 135 hectares of woodland areas, which are remnants of Cumberland Plain Woodland and features 180,000 plants. Most parts of the regional park are made up of 427 hectares of planted re-vegetation and cleared grassland areas. The Parkland's environment has remained very similar to how it was prior European contact. The park consists of 135 hectares of woodland, with the majority comprising 427 hectares of planted vegetation and cleared grassland areas. Until recently, the NSW Government has re-vegetated the area through the Greening Western Sydney Program. The Parkland's revegetation has been going since the early 1990s.

The parkland has three types of soil present, with the primary ones being Luddenham soil, which comes from Wianamatta Shale. Tree in the park include Eucalyptus moluccana, forest red gum, Eucalyptus tereticornis, Eucalyptus crebra, Corymbia, Corymbia maculata, stringybark and Eucalyptus eugenioides. Shrubs include blackthorn, Bursaria spinosa, Themeda triandra, Themeda australis and Microlaena stipoides.

=== Fauna ===
The Park contains threatened and endangered species which are protected under state and Commonwealth legislation. Wildlife in the parks includes many native species of frogs, birds, lizards and bats. Foxes and rabbits are not rare and not unheard of. The parklands from Quakers Hill, Glendenning and all the way to Bungarribee are home to a large population of eastern grey kangaroos. There is also a substantial fallow deer population. Around eighty native vertebrate species exist within the parkland. Migratory birds are also known to visit.

One group of birds that is present all year round are the parrots. Many breeds are found in the Parklands' trees, such as rainbow lorikeets, rosellas, red-rumped parrots, galahs and cockatoos. Threatened species in the park include, Meridolum corneovirens, white-faced heron, grey-headed flying fox, little eagle, eastern false pipistrelle, varied sittella, east-coast free-tailed bat, common bent-wing bat, Rüppell's broad-nosed bat and turquoise parrot. Other species include Pandion haliaetus, Haliastur sphenurus, Haliaeetus leucogaster, Phascogale tapoatafa, Petaurus australis, Petaurus norfolcensis and Petaurus breviceps.

== Recreational features ==
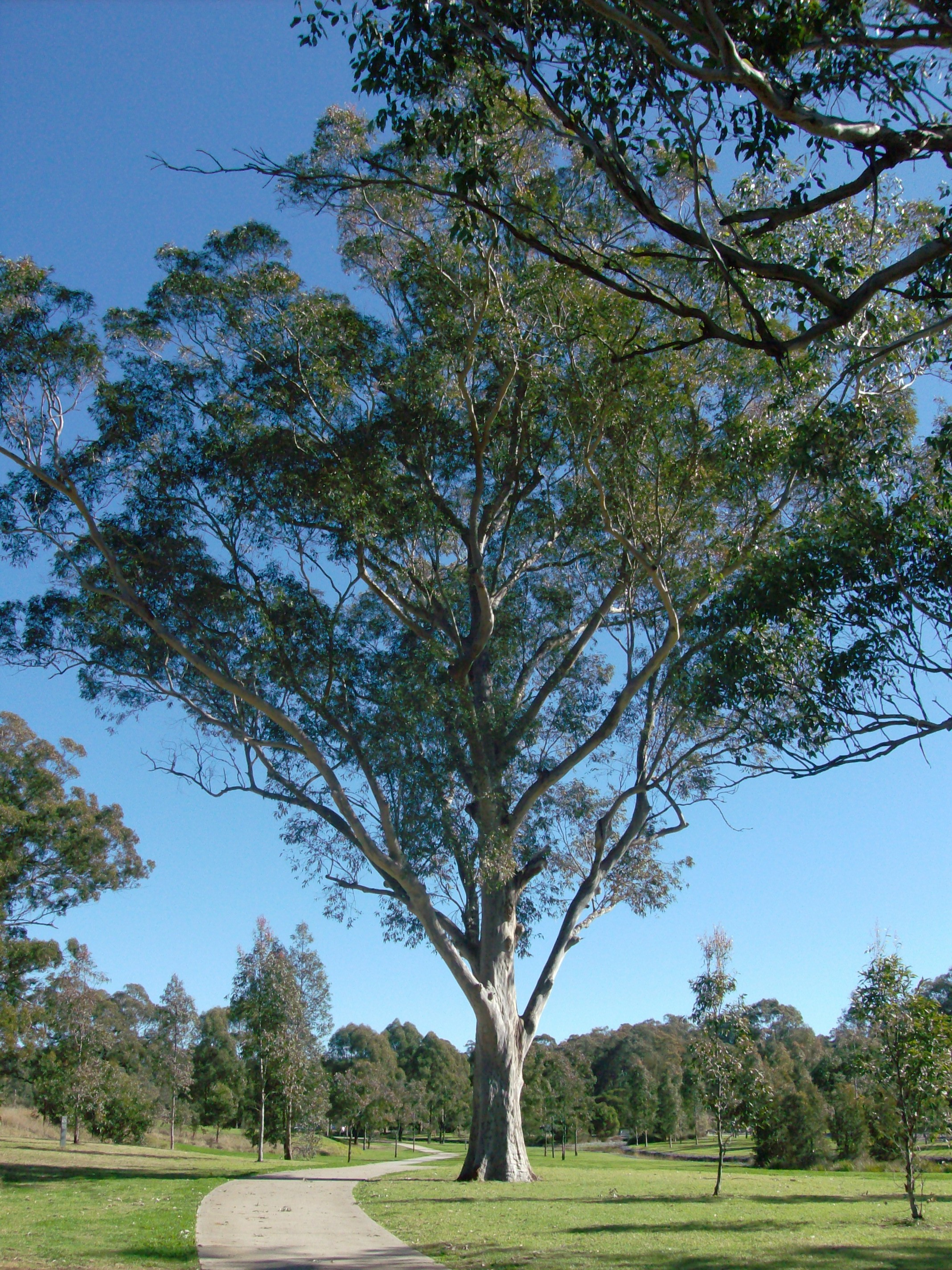
Walking paths are common in the parklands

The parklands have 16 precincts and 50 park areas and has space for 3,000 people/visitors. From north to south, the following parks, reserves, geographical features and sporting facilities are incorporated into the Western Sydney Parklands. Most of the precincts below feature picnic and BBQ areas, pathways (for cycling or walking) and children's playgrounds.

Northern Parklands

- Bungarribee – A 200-hectare park which features an open space and two sealed tracks, in addition to one of Sydney’s largest off-leash dog environments. A large playground with climbing tower also exists, in addition to a large wetland that contains wildflowers. Picnic shelters and barbeques are present. The area incorporates a commercial activity, the Sydney Zoo.
- Nurragingy Reserve – To the northern ends of the park, features a Chinese garden, lake and a picnic spot.
- Blacktown Olympic Park
- The Rooty Hill

Southern Parklands

- Prospect Nature Reserve
- Eastern Creek International Raceway
- Western Sydney Regional Park – A 583 hectare park that features scenic picnic spots, recreational facilities, walking tracks and children's playgrounds
  - Lizard Log
  - The Dairy
  - Plough and Harrow
  - Moonrise Lookout
  - Sugarloaf Ridge
  - TreeTops Adventure Park
  - Calmsley Hill City Farm
  - Sydney International Equestrian Centre
- Shale Hills
- Western Sydney International Dragway
- Sydney International Shooting Centre
- Kemps Creek Nature Reserve

In addition to above, the Parklands contains market gardens, former military places and infrastructural facilities such as water supply canal, pipelines, electricity, gas and water easements, waste services, water storage tanks and telecommunications towers. Heritage sites include the Upper Canal System, The Rooty Hill, Bungarribee Homestead complex archaeological site.

== See also ==
- Protected areas of New South Wales
- List of parks in Sydney
- Blue Mountains National Park
- Cumberland Plain Woodland
- Western Sydney Regional Park
