= Bungarribee =

- Suburb
- Interactive map of Bungarribee
- Coordinates: 33°46′48″S 150°51′19″E
- Country: Australia
- State: New South Wales
- City: Sydney
- LGA: City of Blacktown
- Location: 37 km (23 mi) W of Sydney
- Established: 1882

Government
  - State electorate: Prospect
  - Federal division: McMahon
- Elevation: 47 m (154 ft)

Population
  - Total: 3,177 (2021 census)
- Postcode: 2767
Suburbs around Bungarribee
Rooty Hill	Doonside	Doonside
Rooty Hill	Bungarribee	Arndell Park
Minchinbury	Eastern Creek	Huntingwood

Bungarribee is a suburb of Blacktown, in the state of New South Wales, Australia. Bungarribee is located approximately 37 kilometres west of the Sydney central business district, in the local government area of the City of Blacktown and is part of the Greater Western Sydney region.

== History ==
Bungarribee estate was established in 1822 by Colonel John Campbell (1770–1827) for the purpose of breeding horses for the East India Company. The archeological site around Campbell's Bungarribee Homestead was listed in 2000 on the NSW Heritage Register, though the building was demolished in the 1950s. One of his sons was Charles James Fox Campbell, a pioneer pastoralist in South Australia, after whom the Adelaide suburb of Campbelltown is named.

Following the death of Campbell in 1827 the estate was sold. A subsequent owner, Charles Smith, established Bungarribee stud shortly after 1830, which only had pure-bred English horses. Bungarribee was a major rural employer and breeding area for Australia's horse racing industry. Bungarribee's horses dominated the emerging racing scene in NSW in the 1820s and 1830s , and many of Australia's most prominent race horses trace their bloodlines to Bungarribee. Steeltrap Drive is named after one of the most successful horses of this era and runs through the middle of the site. Many of today's most prominent race horses can trace their history along Steeltrap's blood line. Manto Street is named after Manto, one of the greatest horses that was one of the main breeding mares at Bungarribee. Sir Hercules Parade is named after Sir Hercules, who was the sire of the 1866 Melbourne Cup winner The Barb. Additional names include Velocity Parade, Gipsy Street, Emigrant Parade, Emancipation Street and Bet Hyatt Avenue – all named after successful thoroughbreds bred at Bungarribee.

== Population ==
In the 2021 Census, there were 3,177 people in Bungarribee. 42.0% of people were born in Australia. The next most common countries of birth were India 23.6%, Philippines 7.4%, Fiji 4.3%, Sri Lanka 3.1% and New Zealand 2.0%. 28.9% of people only spoke English at home. Other languages spoken at home included Gujarati 14.1%, Hindi 8.6%, Punjabi 5.9%, Tamil 4.8% and Tagalog 4.1%. The most common responses for religion were Hinduism 34.4%, Catholic 20.6% and Islam 10.2%.

== Transport ==
Approximately 500 metres from the northern end of the suburb is Doonside railway station, which is on the Western Line of the Sydney Trains network. It provides direct links east to Blacktown, Parramatta and Sydney CBD and west to Mount Druitt and Penrith. Due to the new developments there is a new bus stop on Steeltrap Drive. The Great Western Highway is nearby and provides access to the M4 and M7 motorways.

== Recreation ==
Bungarribee contains Bungarribee Nature Reserve, which provides areas for dog-walking and casual recreation. A cage-free zoo, Sydney Zoo, opened in 2019, and is to the northwest of the suburb (adjacent to the Western Sydney Parklands).

== See also ==
- Bungarribee Homestead
