= Arndell Park =

- Suburb
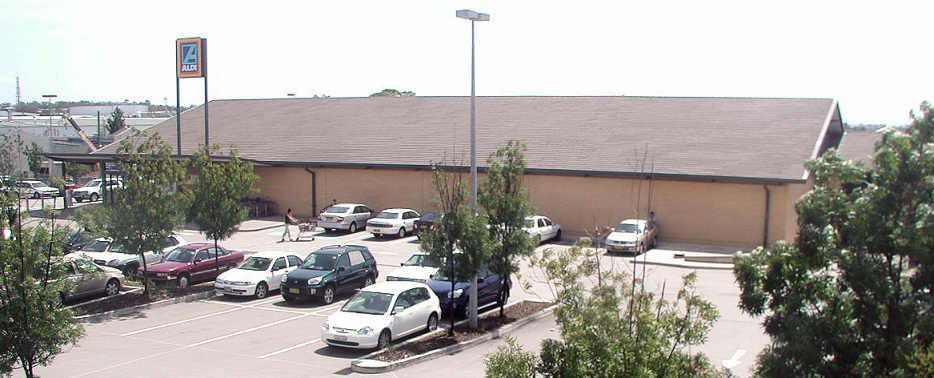
- Arndell Park Shopping Centre

- Interactive map of Arndell Park
- Coordinates: 33°47′24″S 150°52′33.6″E
- Country: Australia
- State: New South Wales
- City: Sydney
- LGA: City of Blacktown
- Location: 35 km (22 mi) W of Sydney

Government
  - State electorate: Prospect
  - Federal division: McMahon
- Elevation: 53 m (174 ft)

Population
  - Total: 6 (2021 census)
- Postcode: 2148
Suburbs around Arndell Park
| Doonside | Blacktown | Blacktown |
| Bungarribee | Arndell Park | Blacktown |
| Eastern Creek | Huntingwood | Prospect |

Arndell Park is a predominantly industrial suburb in the City of Blacktown, in Western Sydney, in the state of New South Wales, Australia. Its postcode is 2148. Arndell Park is located approximately 35 km (22 mi) west of the Sydney central business district.

== History ==
The suburb takes its name from Thomas Arndell who was appointed Assistant Surgeon to the settlement in New South Wales and arrived with the First Fleet. He later joined Captain Tench in 1789 in the journey of exploration from Prospect Hill to the Nepean River.

== Retail and commercial services ==
There is a retail and commercial mall in Arndell Park comprising a discount supermarket, a solicitors office, a medical centre, a bottle shop, and several discount stores and food outlets.
