= Sydney Zoo =

Zoo in Sydney, New South Wales, Australia

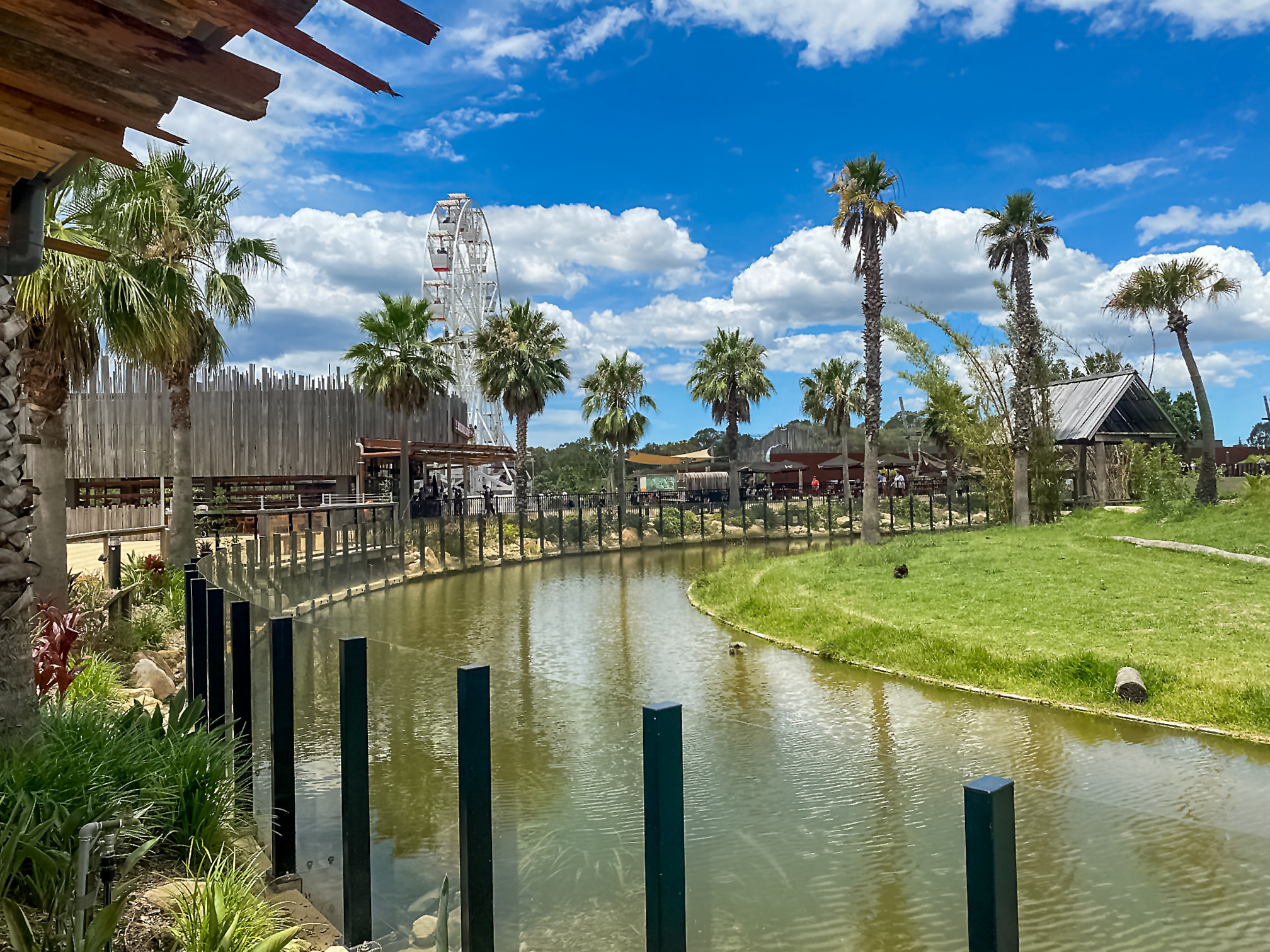
- Internal view of the zoo
- Interactive map of Sydney Zoo
- 33°47′28″S 150°52′1″E
- Slogan: A unique animal encounter and educational experience
- Date opened: 7 December 2019
- Location: Bungarribee, Western Sydney Parklands, Sydney. New South Wales, Australia
- Land area: 16.5 hectares (41 acres)
- No. of species: 100+
- Annual visitors: 800,000 (forecasted estimate)
- Memberships: ZAA
- Owner: Privately-owned
- Management: Jake Burgess (CEO)
- Website: sydneyzoo.com

Sydney Zoo is a zoo in Bungarribee in Greater Western Sydney, New South Wales, Australia. Sydney Zoo is located 38 kilometres (24 mi) west of the Sydney central business district (Sydney City Centre). It occupies a 16.5-hectare (41-acre) site. Sydney Zoo is a member of the Zoos and Aquariums Association of Australia and New Zealand.

== Development ==
Sydney Zoo was founded in 2015 with an aim to introduce local and international visitors to a range of animal species from all over the world, while also educating on animal welfare and conservation. The zoo has formed a partnership with the Western Sydney University and TAFE NSW.

Sydney Zoo's senior curatorial and animal acquisition team includes current and former presidents of the NSW Fauna and Marine Parks Association (NSW FMPA) and the current president of the International Congress of Zoos (ICZ).

The zoo is subject to the oversight of government agencies including the Animal Welfare Unit of the NSW Department of Primary Industries (DPI) and the key zoo industry body in Australasia, the Zoo and Aquarium Association (ZAA). The zoo's social programs include school education programs and aboriginal employment. Specific infrastructure to assist in the delivery of these programs includes veterinary facilities, quarantine facilities, extensive feed preparation and storage areas, an educational amphitheatre and disability access.

Photo gallery
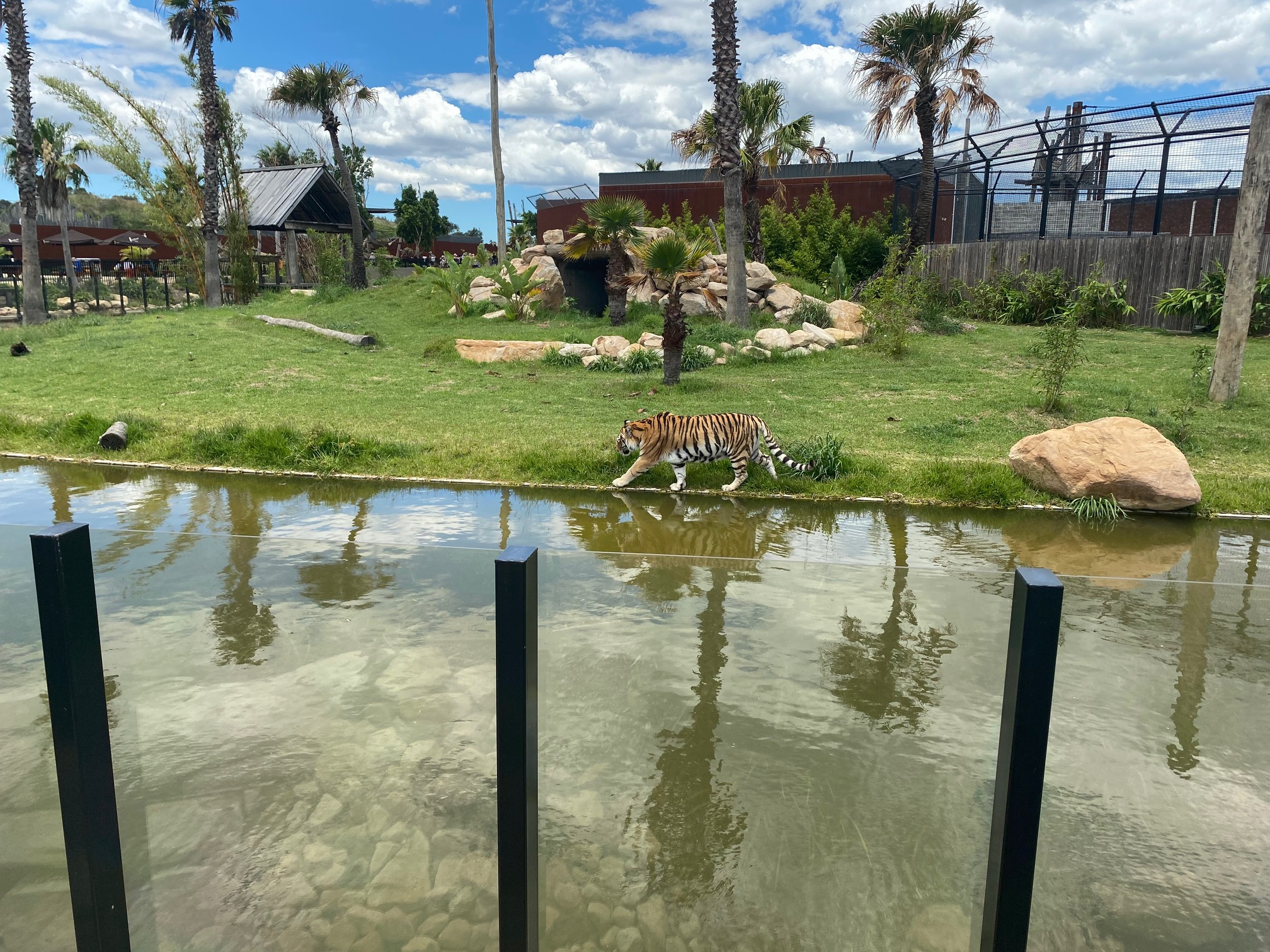
Tiger

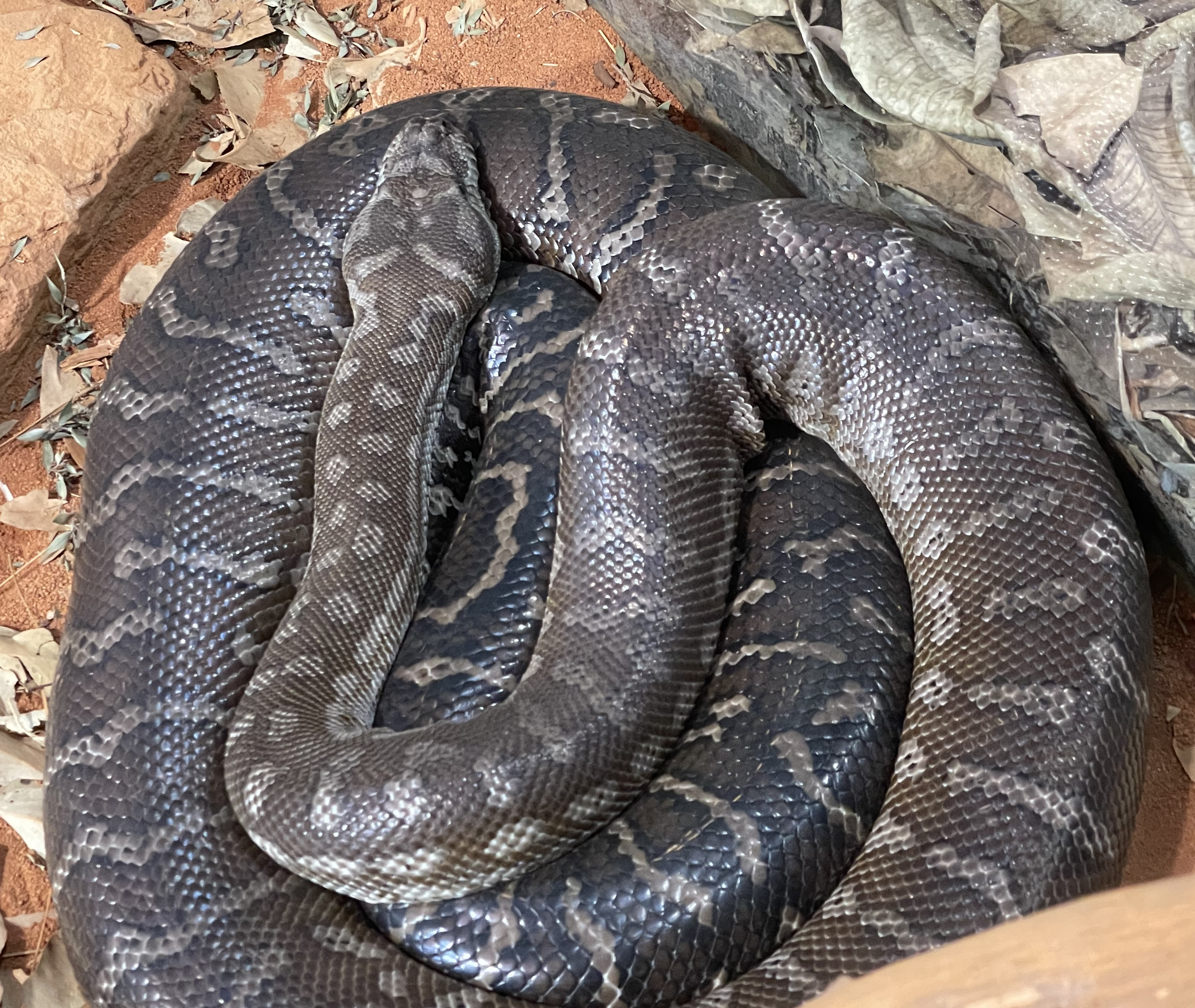
Centralian carpet python

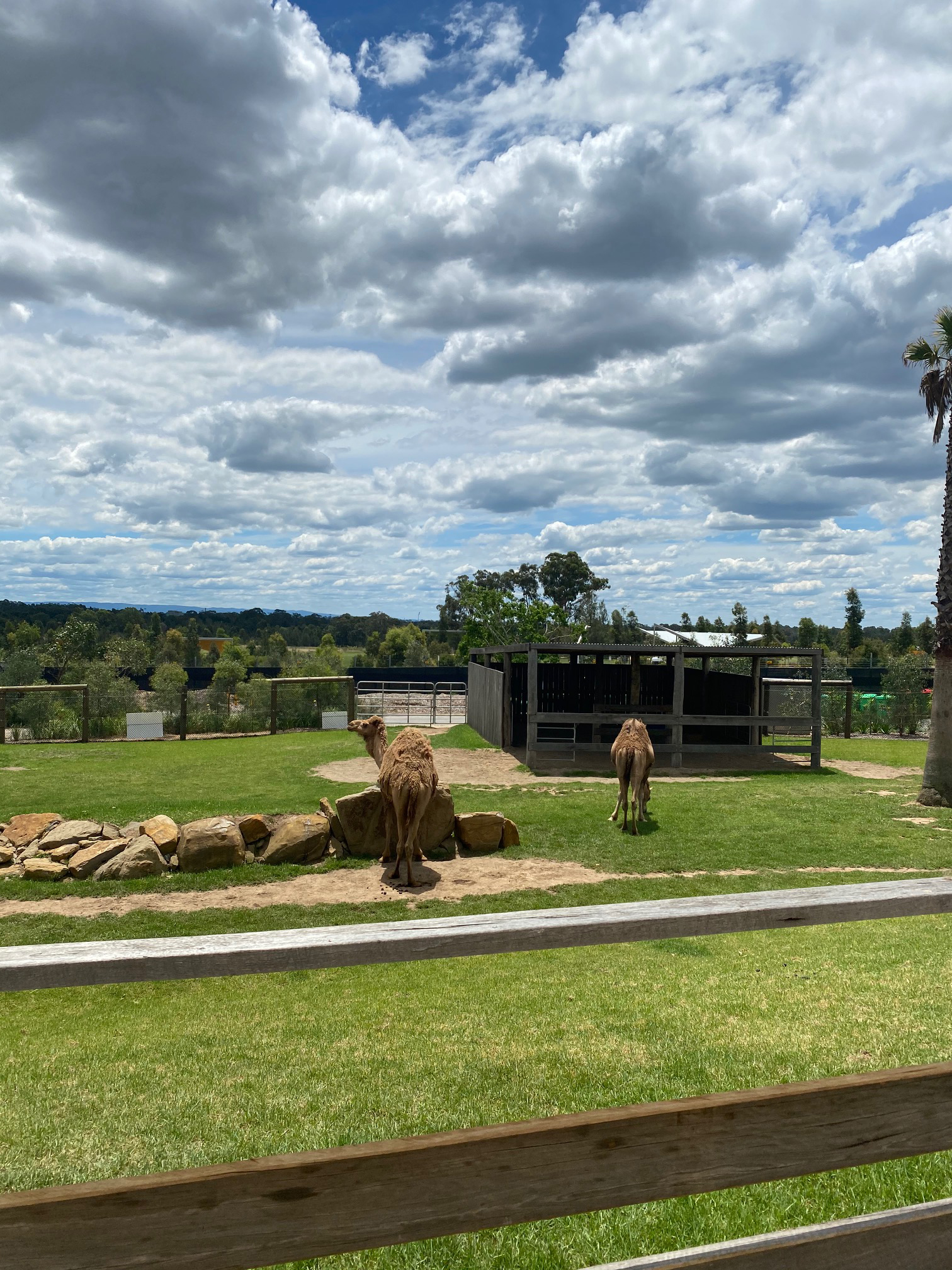
Dromedary camels

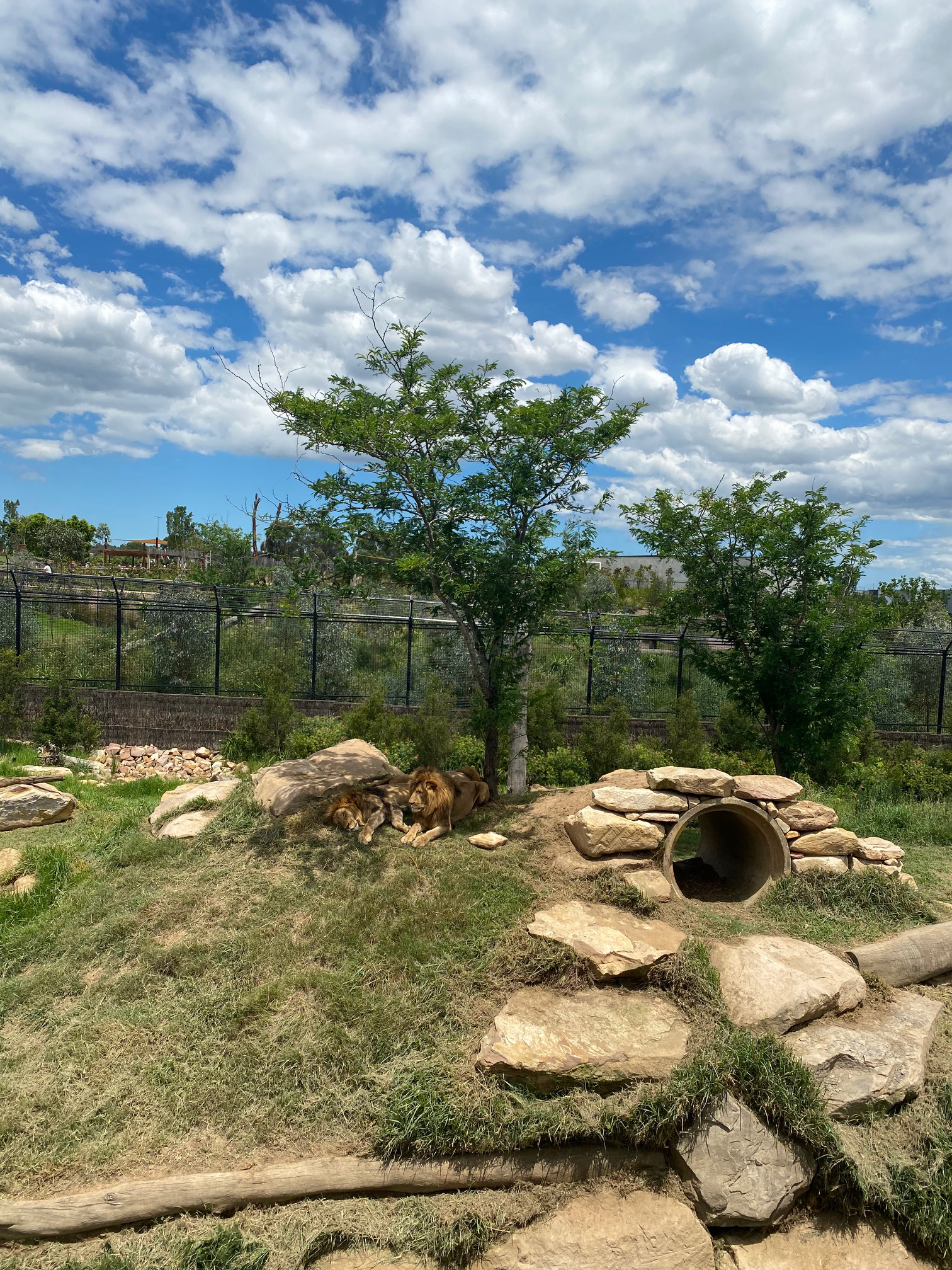
African lions

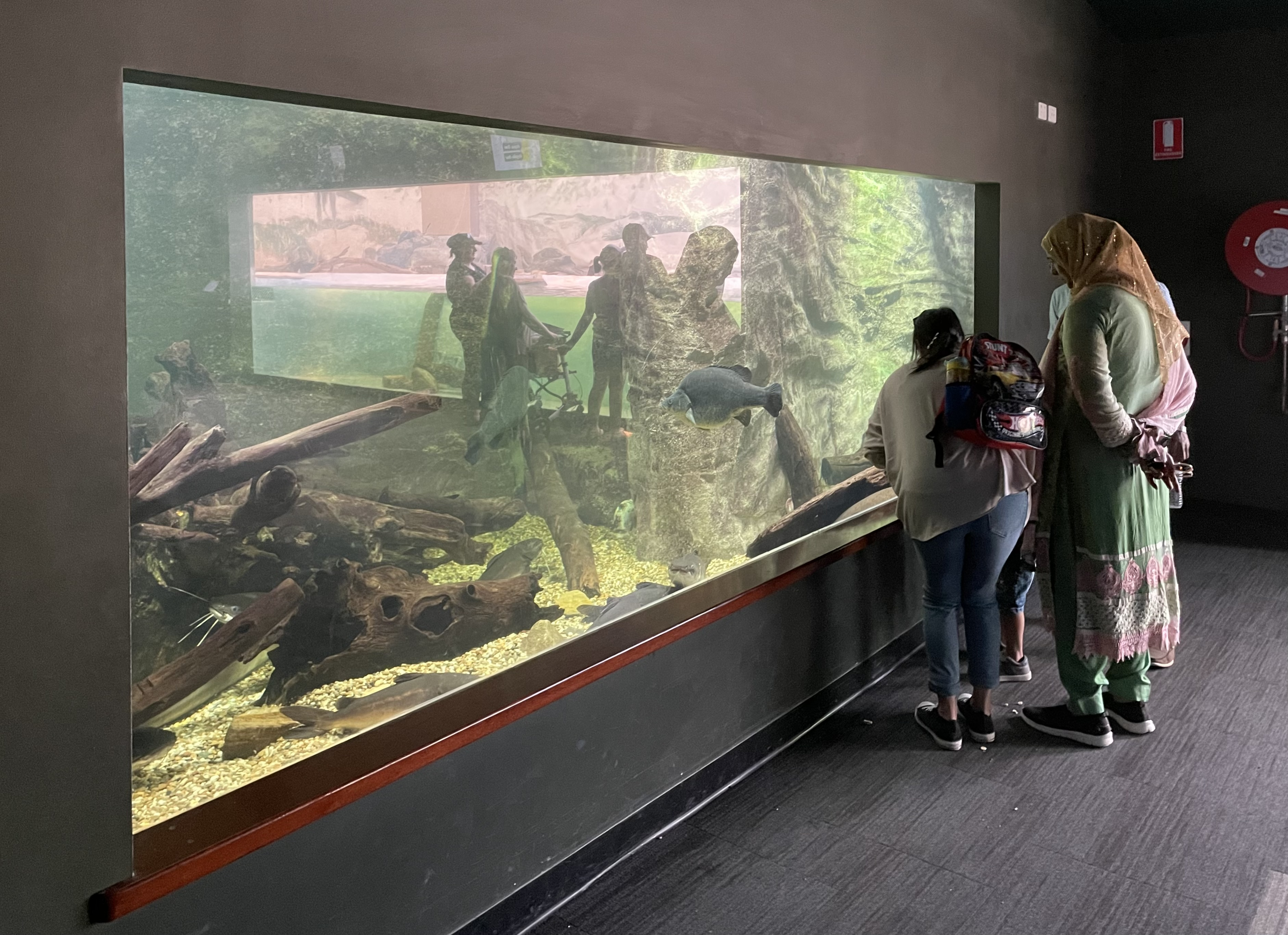
One of the aquarium exhibits at the zoo

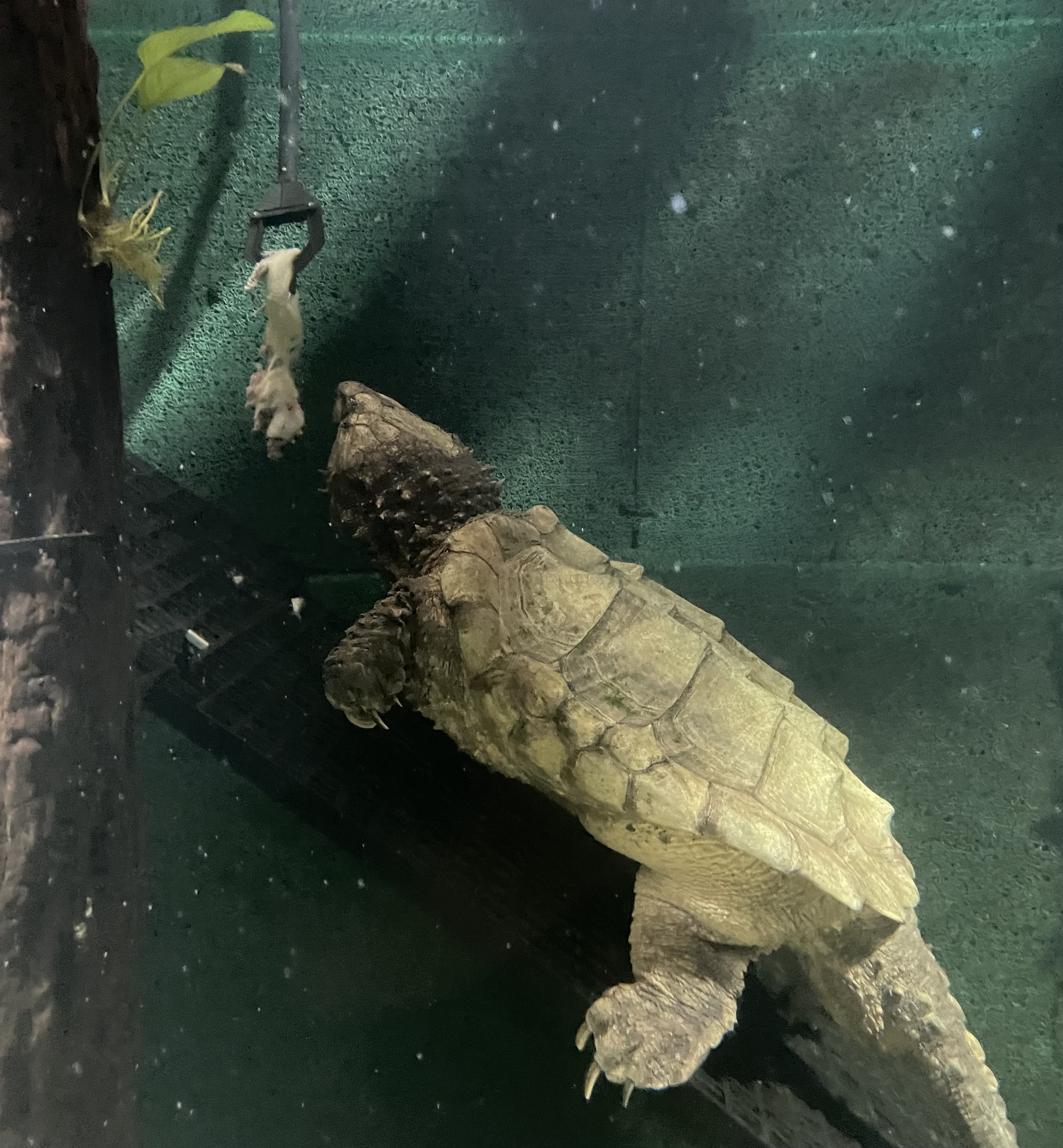
Alligator snapping turtle at feeding time

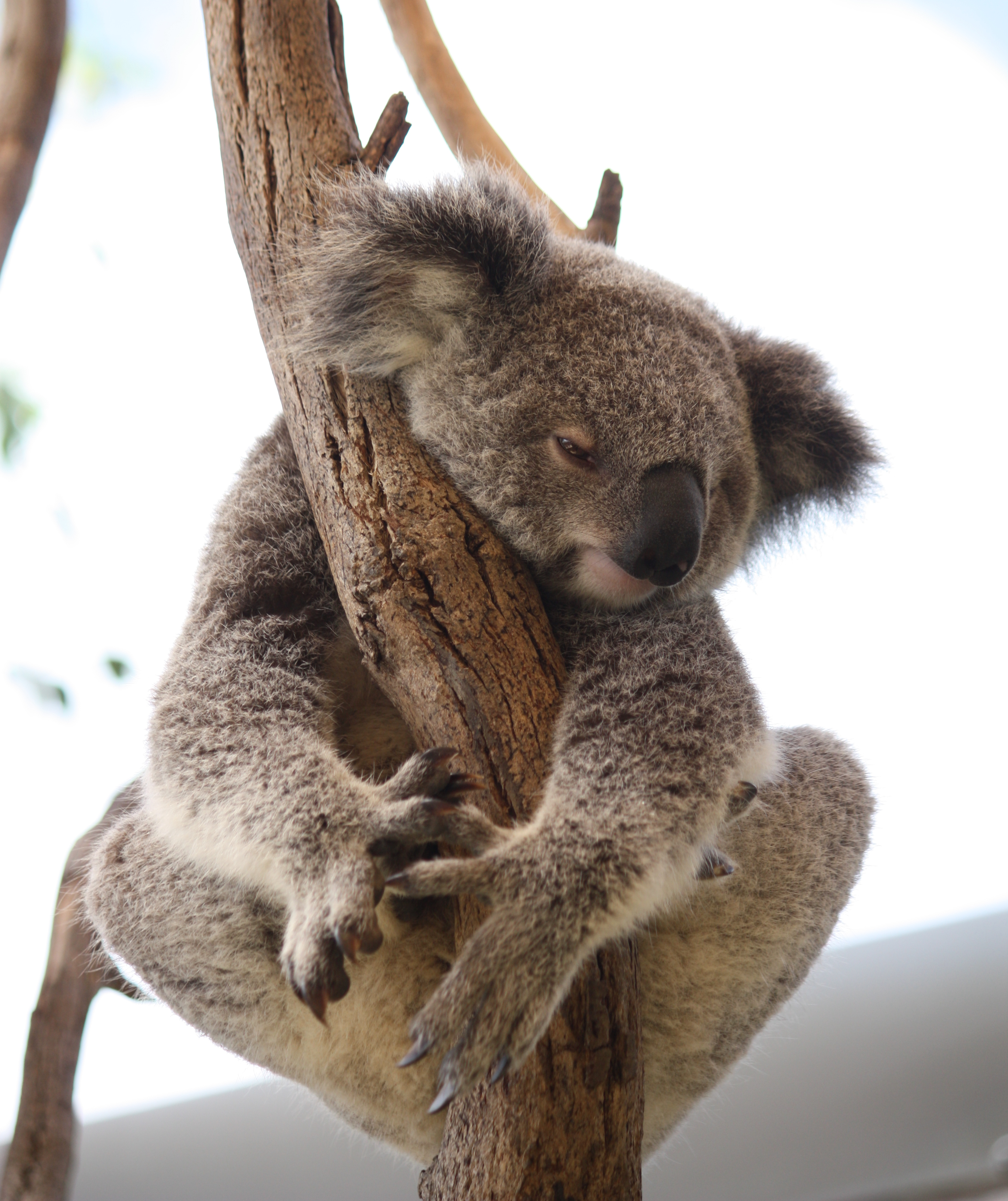
Koala

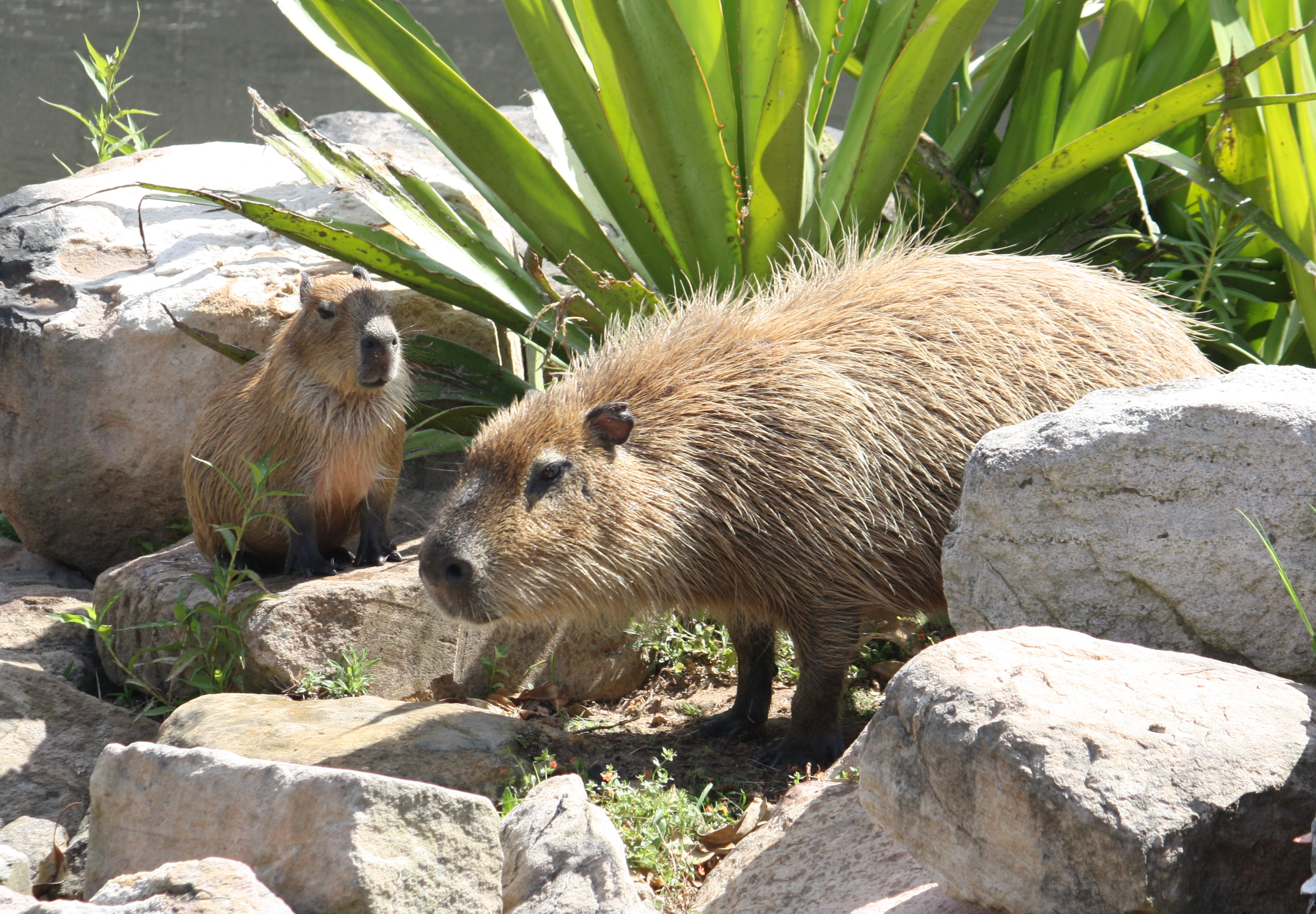
Capybaras (adult and young)

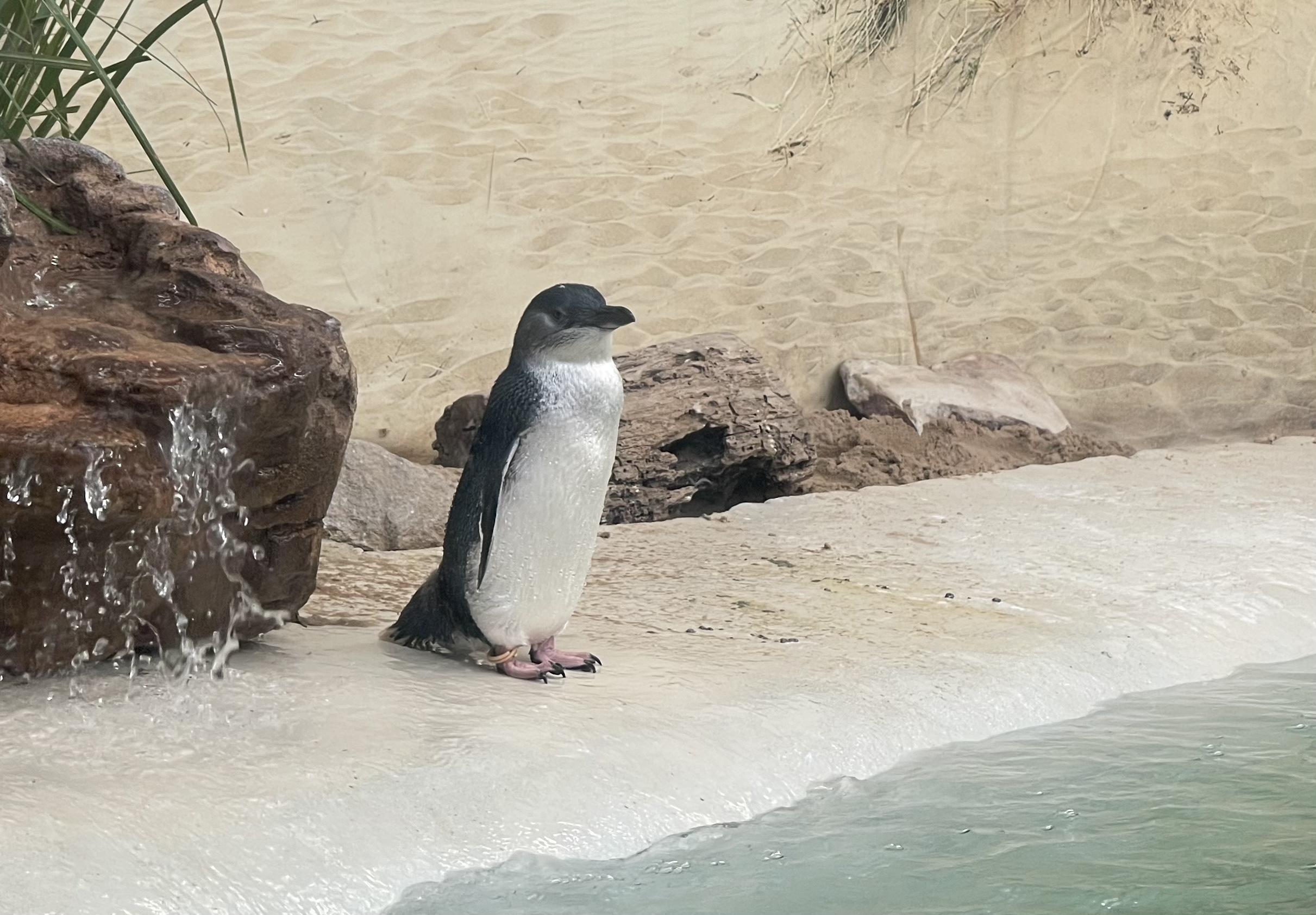
Little penguins

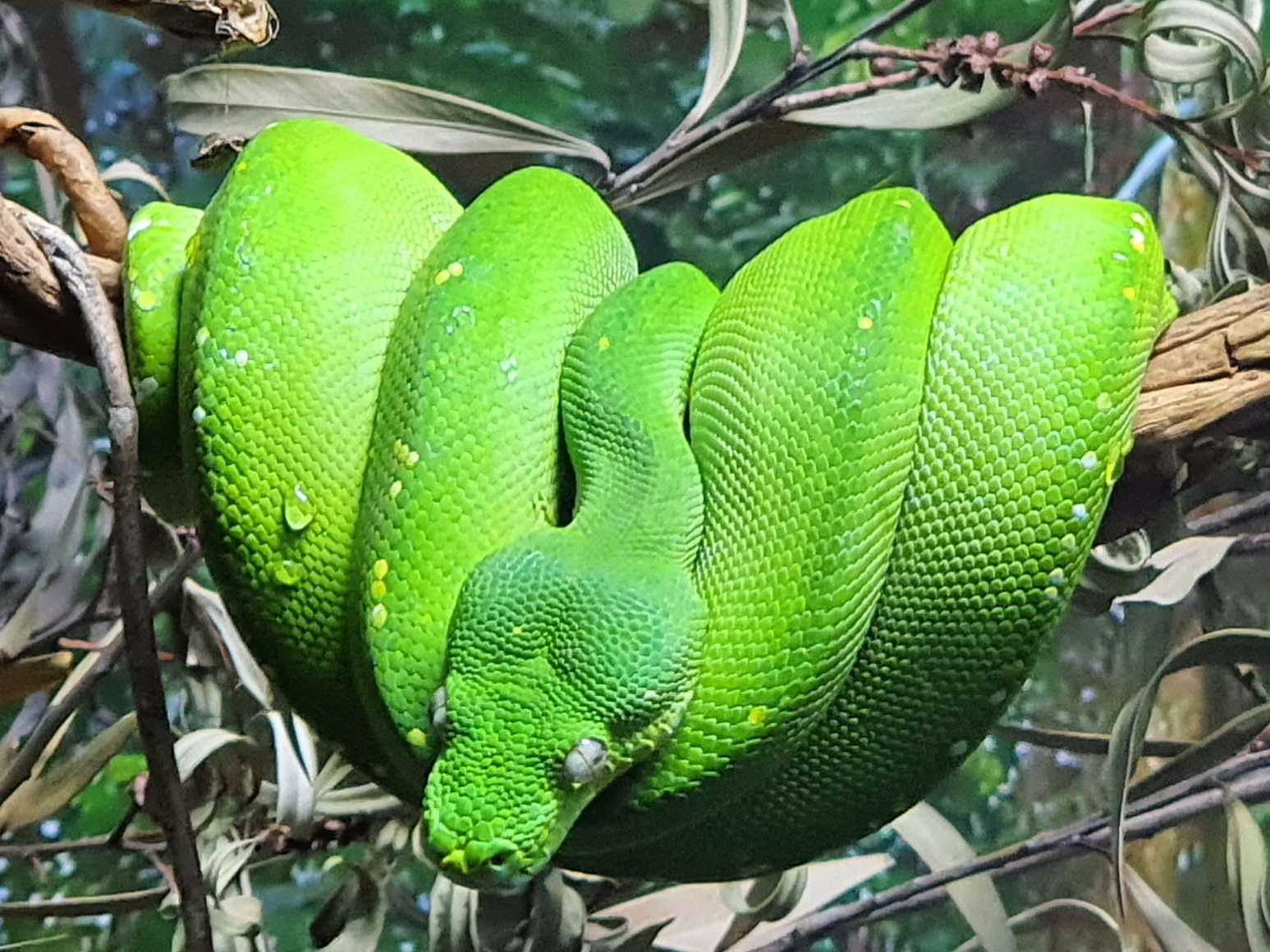
Green tree python

== Exhibits ==
Sydney Zoo's exhibit sizes exceed NSW Department of Primary Industries standards by an average of 2.6 times. Sydney Zoo includes over 30 exhibits and a variety of animal species both exotic and Australian native kept in different focus precinct alphabetically listed below.

Primate Boulevard

- Black-capped capuchin monkey
- Chimpanzee
- Hamadryas baboon
- Ringtailed lemur

Asia

- Asian elephant
- Asian small-clawed otter
- Red panda
- Sumatran orangutan
- Sumatran tiger

Africa

- African lion
- African wild dog
- Cape porcupine
- Cheetah
- Dromedary camel
- Giraffe
- Helmeted guineafowl
- Meerkat
- Nyala
- Ostrich
- Plains zebra
- Southern white rhinoceros
- Spotted hyena
- (Capybara also live in an exhibit in this area of the zoo, albeit actually from South America)

Australia

- Common wombat
- Dingo
- Emu
- Kangaroo Island kangaroo
- Koala
- Parma wallaby
- Quokka
- Red kangaroo
- Southern cassowary
- Swamp wallaby
- Tammar wallaby
- Tasmanian devil
- Yellow-footed rock wallaby

Middle Corridor (Australia Building)

- Australian green tree frog
- Centralian knob-tailed gecko
- Goliath stick insect
- Green and golden bell frog
- Magnificent tree frog
- Northern leaf-tailed gecko
- Spiny katydid insect
- Spiny leaf insect

Nocturnal Australia (Australia Building)

- Bilby
- Black-footed tree-rat
- Common ringtail possum
- Eastern quoll
- Fat-tailed dunnart
- Ghost bat
- Long-nosed potoroo
- Spinifex hopping mouse
- Squirrel glider
- Yellow-bellied glider

Reptile House (Australia Building)

- Australian scrub python
- Black-headed monitor
- Boyd's forest dragon
- Broad-headed snake
- Burn's dragon
- Central netted dragon
- Centralian carpet python
- Common death adder
- Diamond carpet python
- Eastern brown snake
- Frill necked lizard
- Gidgee skink
- Green tree python
- Heath monitor
- Inland taipan
- Lace monitor
- Mertens' water monitor
- Perentie
- Pygmy spiny-tailed skink
- Red-bellied black snake
- Rough-scaled python
- Shingleback skink
- Tiger snake

Aquarium

- Alligator snapping turtle
- Australian bass
- Banded rainbowfish
- Barbour's seahorse
- Barramundi
- Bicolour blenny
- Black phantom tetra
- Black-axil puller
- Blacktail humbug
- Bristlenose catfish
- Cleaner shrimp
- Common clownfish
- Common yabby
- Coral cardinalfish
- Crimson-spotted rainbowfish
- Dusky surgeonfish
- Dwarf hawkish
- Eastern long-necked turtle
- Eastern water dragon
- Eel-tailed catfish
- Emperor tetra
- Fork-tailed catfish
- Freshwater angelfish
- Giant glassfish
- Glowlight tetra
- Golden perch
- Golden-head sleeper goby
- Gulf saratoga
- Indo-Pacific tarpon
- Jade perch
- Leopard wrasse
- Little penguin
- Longfin eel
- Mandarinfish
- Milkfish
- Mono
- Morrison's dragonfish
- Murray cod
- Murray River rainbowfish
- Neon tetra
- Olive perchlet
- Orange-spot surgeonfish
- Pacific blue-eye
- Peppermint shrimp
- Pig-nosed turtle
- Pink anemonefish
- Red rainbowfish
- Red-spotted blenny
- Rummy-nose tetra
- Saltwater crocodile
- Sand-sifting sea star
- Seven-spot archerfish
- Silver perch
- Sixline wrasse
- Snakehead gudgeon
- Spotted gar
- Spotted scat
- Western carp gudgeon
- Yellow boxfish
- Yellow coral goby
- Yellow-eyed mullet
- Zebra dartfish

Additionally the zoo has VIP closeup encounters offered for Bolivian squirrel monkeys.

== See also ==
- Louise Grossfeldt (Sydney Zoo's primates curator)
- Taronga Zoo
- Featherdale Wildlife Park
