= Division of McMahon =

Australian federal electoral division

Coordinates: 33.837°S 150.859°E

McMahon Australian House of Representatives Division
- Interactive map of electorate boundaries from the 2025 federal election
- Created: 2010
- MP: Chris Bowen
- Party: Labor
- Namesake: Sir William McMahon
- Electors: 120,559 (2025)
- Area: 179 km^{2} (69.1 sq mi)
- Demographic: Outer metropolitan
Electorates around McMahon:
Lindsay	Chifley	Greenway
Lindsay	McMahon	Parramatta
Werriwa; Hume	Fowler	Blaxland

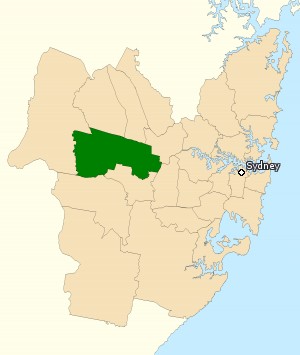
Boundaries of McMahon from 2016 to 2025

The Division of McMahon (/məkmɑːn/ mək-MAHN) is an Australian electoral division in the state of New South Wales.

McMahon is in Sydney's outer western suburbs. McMahon lies south of the Great Western Highway, roughly between Woodville Road and South Creek.

The current MP is Chris Bowen, a member of the Australian Labor Party.

== History ==
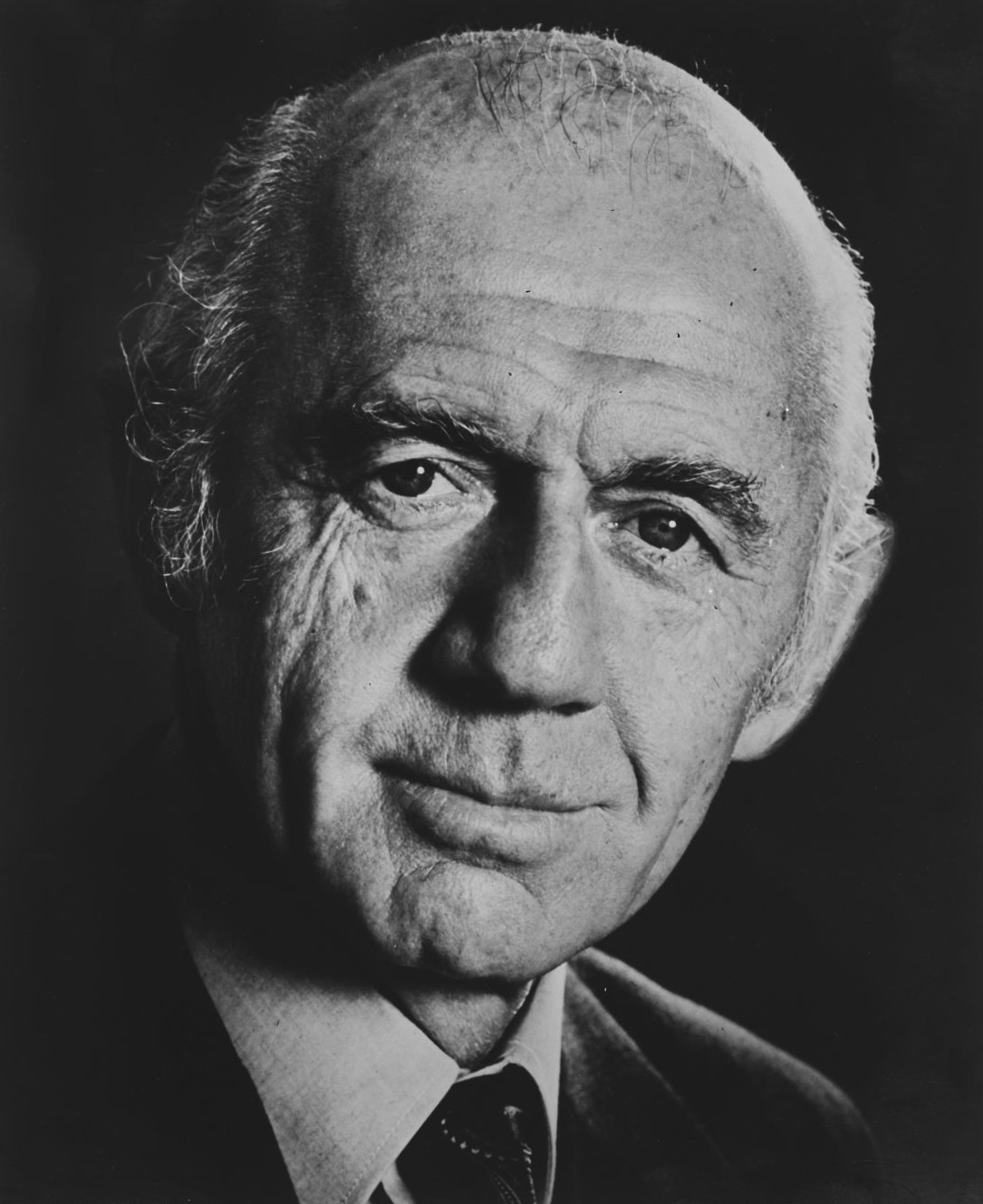
Sir William McMahon, the division's namesake

The division was established in 2010 and is named in honour of former Australian Prime Minister Sir William McMahon. It replaced the abolished division of Prospect.

The current member for McMahon, since the 2010 federal election, is the former member for Prospect, Chris Bowen, former interim leader of the Australian Labor Party.

In 2017, the division had the third-highest percentage of "No" responses in the Australian Marriage Law Postal Survey, with 64.9% of the electorate's respondents to the survey responding "No".

== Geography ==
The division is in the western suburbs of Sydney, and includes the suburbs of Arndell Park, Bungarribee, Erskine Park, Fairfield Heights, Greystanes, Horsley Park, Huntingwood, Minchinbury, Mount Vernon, Pemulwuy, Prospect, Smithfield and St Clair; as well as parts of Arndell Park, Blacktown, Canley Vale, Cecil Park, Eastern Creek, Fairfield, Fairfield West, Kemps Creek, Orchard Hills, Seven Hills, South Wentworthville and Wetherill Park.

Federal electoral division boundaries in Australia are determined at redistributions by a redistribution committee appointed by the Australian Electoral Commission. Redistributions occur for the boundaries of divisions in a particular state, and they occur every seven years, or sooner if a state's representation entitlement changes or when divisions of a state are malapportioned.

== Demographics ==
McMahon is a diverse electorate, with slightly fewer electors of immigrant background than nearby Blaxland, Watson, and Fowler. Common ancestries in McMahon include Assyrian, Iraqi, Chinese, and Italian Australians. It has a mix of adherents to Catholicism at 36.1%, Islam at 11.5%, and other religions.

In the most recent election, Labor performed best in Fairfield, an ethnic enclave of Assyrians, while the Liberal Party did best in the rural precincts of Kemps Creek and Horsley Park in the west.

According to the 2016 census, 42.3% of people spoke only English at home. Other languages spoken at home include Arabic 12.8%, Vietnamese 4.8%, Assyrian Neo-Aramaic 4.1%, Spanish 2.1% and Mandarin 2.1%.

== Members ==
Image	Member	Party	Term	Notes
	Chris Bowen (1973–)	Labor	21 August 2010 – present	Previously held the Division of Prospect. Served as minister under Gillard and Rudd. Served as Opposition Leader in 2013. Incumbent. Currently a minister under Albanese

== Election results ==
2025 Australian federal election: McMahon
Party	Candidate	Votes	%	±%
Labor	Chris Bowen	44,537	45.52	−2.99
Liberal	Carmen Lazar	26,218	26.80	−1.31
Independent	Matthew Camenzuli	9,613	9.83	+9.83
Greens	Ben Hammond	8,923	9.12	+3.02
One Nation	Melissa Janicska	8,544	8.73	+3.69
Total formal votes		97,835	89.42	−0.81
Informal votes		11,581	10.58	+0.81
Turnout		109,416	90.77	+6.13
Two-party-preferred result
Labor	Chris Bowen	57,742	59.02	−1.46
Liberal	Carmen Lazar	40,093	40.98	+1.46
Labor hold		Swing	−1.46	
