= Robert Crawford (Australian poet) =

Australian poet (1868–1930)

- Born: 29 October 1868; Doonside, Colony of New South Wales, Australia
- Died: 13 January 1930 (aged 61); Lindield, Sydney, Australia
- Education: University of Sydney
- Occupation: Poet
- Writing career
- Language: English
- Years active: 1898–1930

Robert Crawford (29 October 1868 – 13 January 1930) was an Australian poet.

== Biography and career ==
Crawford was born in the Sydney suburb of Doonside in what was in then the Colony of New South Wales, the son of Robert Crawford senior, and was educated at The King's School, Parramatta, and the University of Sydney. Crawford is believed to have been the first prize-winning haiku poet published in Australia, in The Bulletin on 12 August 1899.

In 1904, Lyric Moods:Various Verses, was published in Sydney. An enlarged edition was later published in Melbourne retitled simply Lyric Moods (1909).

Crawford died at Lindfield, New South Wales on 13 January 1930.

== Poetry collections ==
- Lyric Moods: Various Verses (1904)
- Lyric Moods (1909)
- The Leafy Bliss (1921)
