= Featherdale Wildlife Park =

Zoo in Doonside, New South Wales, Australia

Featherdale Sydney Wildlife Park

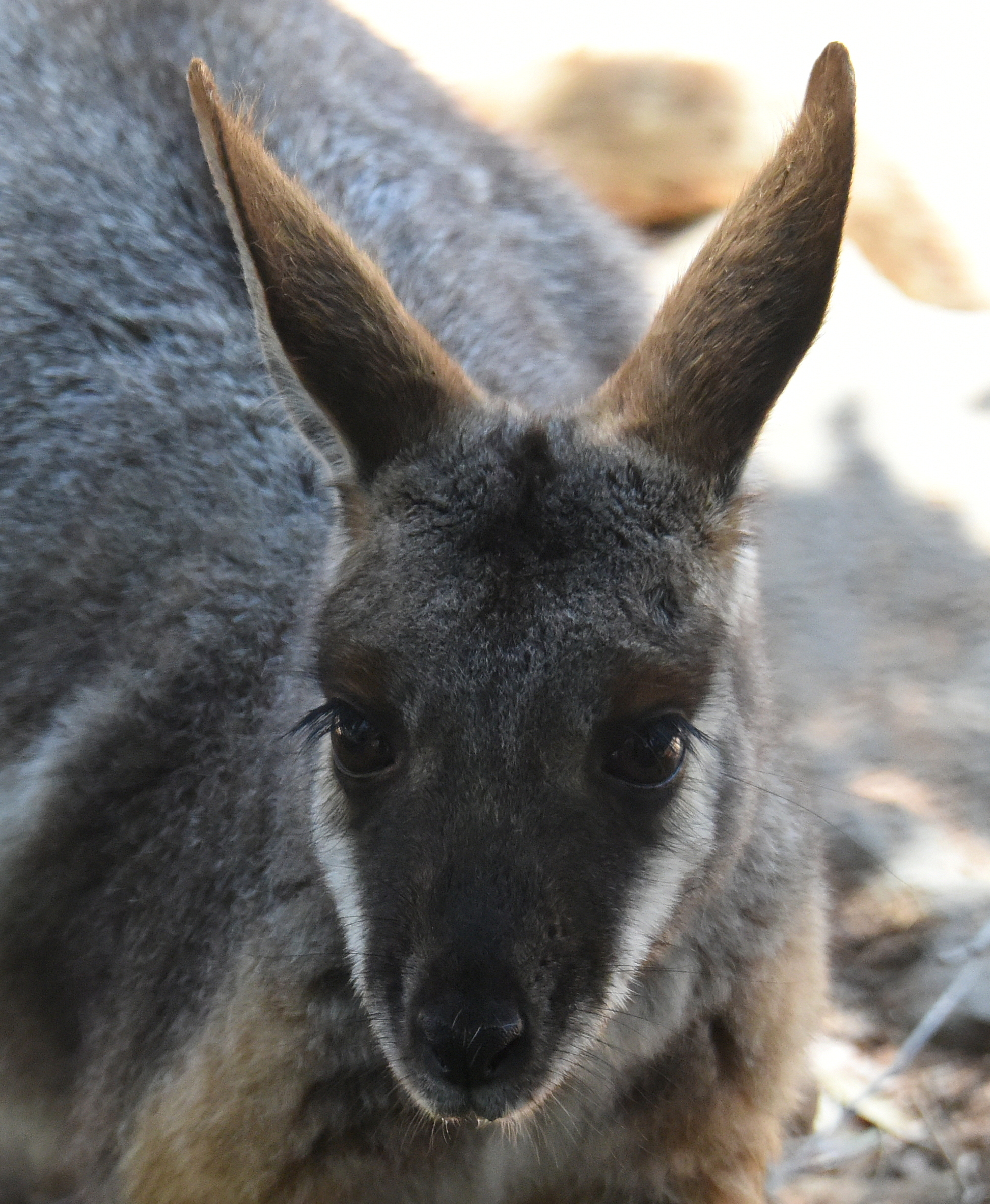
- Yellow-footed rock-wallaby at Featherdale Wildlife Park
- Interactive map of Featherdale Sydney Wildlife Park
- 33°45′58″S 150°53′03″E
- Date opened: 1972; 54 years ago
- Location: Doonside, New South Wales, Australia
- Major exhibits: Mammals; Birds; Wildlife; Reptiles; Marsupials
- Website: www.featherdale.com.au

Featherdale Wildlife Park is a zoo located in Doonside, Sydney, Australia. The park is located in Sydney's west, approximately 40 km (25 mi) from Sydney's CBD. The park contains various species native to Australia, and is known to be one of the world's largest collections of Australian fauna. The facility provides displays, events and interactive experiences. The site covers 3.29 hectares (8.1 acres), ranging from animal enclosures and display areas to visitor facilities, including picnic spaces, shops and basic amenities. It specialises in Australian native wildlife and birds, as well as reptiles and marsupials. The premises is accredited by the Zoo Aquarium Association Australia.

== History ==
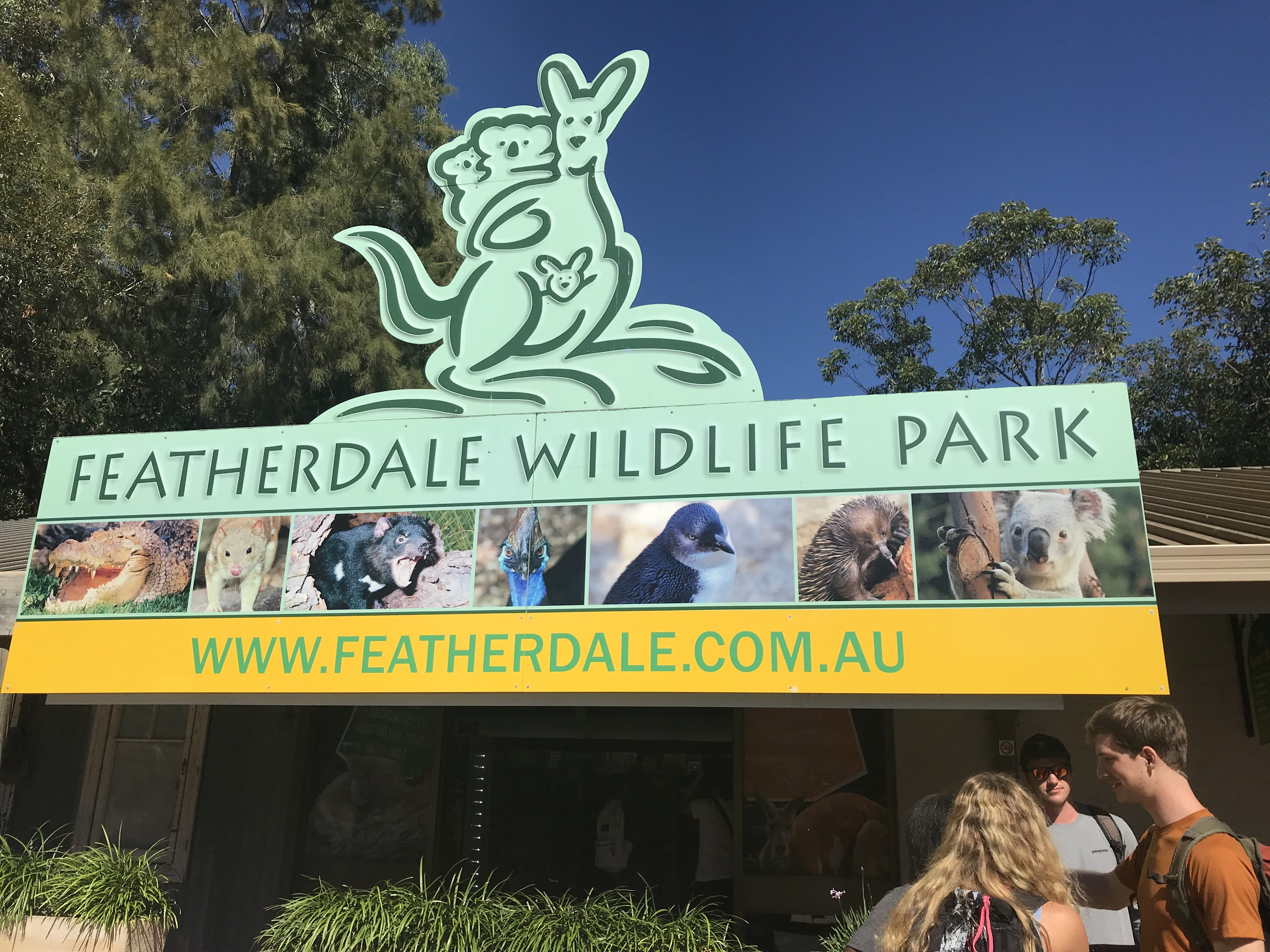
Signage at the entrance of Featherdale Wildlife Park

Featherdale is located on what was originally a 7-acre (2.8 ha) plot of land owned by Charles and Marjorie Wigg, which they purchased in 1953, in what was then a poultry farm. It was opened in 1972, by their son-in-law Bruce Kubbere, who had studied fauna. The park initially opened as a nursery, lined with Australian native trees and plants, in conjunction with a wildlife park. It was threatened with closure in 1975 by rezoning and development for public housing, but the decision was reversed by premier Sir Robert Askin. In 1996 the park won in the category of significant tourist attraction at the Australian Tourism Awards.

In December 2016, the NSW Government's Planning Assessment Commission visited the premises for a tour and meeting. The involved parties gathered to assess the functions of Featherdale Wildlife Park with regards to a proposed development of Sydney Zoo.

Featherdale won the best NSW Major Tourist Attraction award in 2005 and 2009. Many celebrities have visited Featherdale, including Leonardo DiCaprio, Will Smith, Gwen Stefani, Kristen Stewart, Taylor Lautner, Robert De Niro, Matt Damon, Dave Grohl and Smokey Robinson.

In November 2019, Featherdale Wildlife Park management bought Mogo Zoo from Sally Padey (Mogo's owner for over 30 years), and commenced management from the end of the month. Since the new ownership, the park closed on two occasions. Closures occurred due to the COVID-19 pandemic and fires that occurred on the south east coast of NSW. Featherdale Wildlife Park stated that the closures had significant impacts on the animals that were conditioned to constant attention from visitors.

== Visitation ==
In 2016 the park estimated that it had served 11.5 million visitors since its opening.

Number of visitors
Year	Number of visitors
2013	350,000+
2016	400,000+
2019	600,000+
Total	11,500,000+ (2016)

=== Sources of visitors ===
The rates of domestic and international visitors vary on the global environment. Upon the onset of the COVID-19 pandemic, around half of visitors were thought to be international. The tight restrictions on international travel into Australia thus led to a significant reduction in visitation numbers. However, the Mogo Wildlife Park, which was not a significant international tourism destination, was not as affected. Around 2014, domestic and International visitors were relatively similar, with 47 per cent international visitors. In 2016, of its 400,000 annual visitors, 180,000 were from Australia, including 65,000 from Western Sydney.

== Facilities and amenities ==
Featherdale is located in Doonside, part of Western Sydney, approximately 40 kilometres from the CBD. Its 3.29 hectares (8.1 acres) include animal enclosures and display areas, as well as visitor facilities such as picnic spaces, shops, and basic amenities.

Featherdale Wildlife Park provides various facilities that cater to the convenience of visitors, the assistance of those with impairments and basic essential amenities.

The premises is a ZAA-accredited (Zoo Aquarium Association Australasia) facility, ensuring that the wildlife park cooperates with state and federal government standards and legislation.

=== Basic facilities ===
Featherdale Wildlife Park includes a variety of facilities and amenities aside from the animal attractions. These are for the use of visitors, extending to tourists, businesses events and school trips. The facilities include:

- Car park near premises entrance with 100–120 spaces
- Two picnic area
- Three bathrooms
- A two-story café
- An information centre
- Gift shop
- Function centre
- First aid
- And a school assembly point.

=== Disability amenities ===
- Wheelchair access
- Companion Card – allows for the carers of disabled people to gain free entry into the premises and related events
- And supports programs for disabled and disadvantaged people.

== Exhibits and wildlife collection ==
=== Animals ===
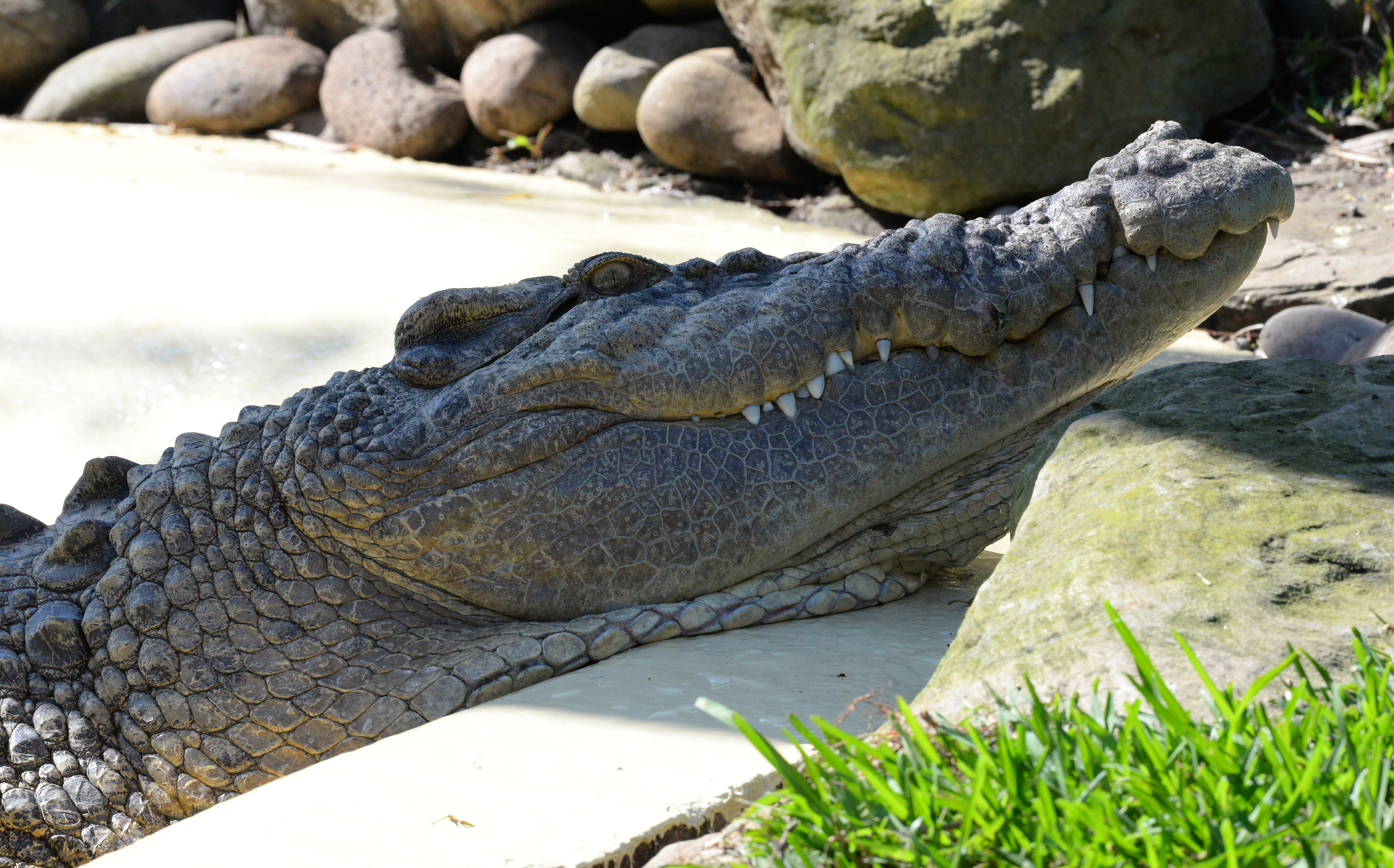
Saltwater crocodile at the park

The park contains various species native to Australia, and is known to be one of the world's largest collections of Australian fauna. Some of these are endangered in the wild like the Tasmanian devil and plains-wanderer. The park's collection includes kangaroos, wallabies, koalas, wombats, short-beaked echidnas, quokkas, quolls, greater bilbies, dingos, emus, southern cassowaries, little penguins, saltwater crocodiles, and several other mammals, reptiles and birds. The facility contains around 2000 individual animals within 260 species.

=== Interactive animal encounters ===
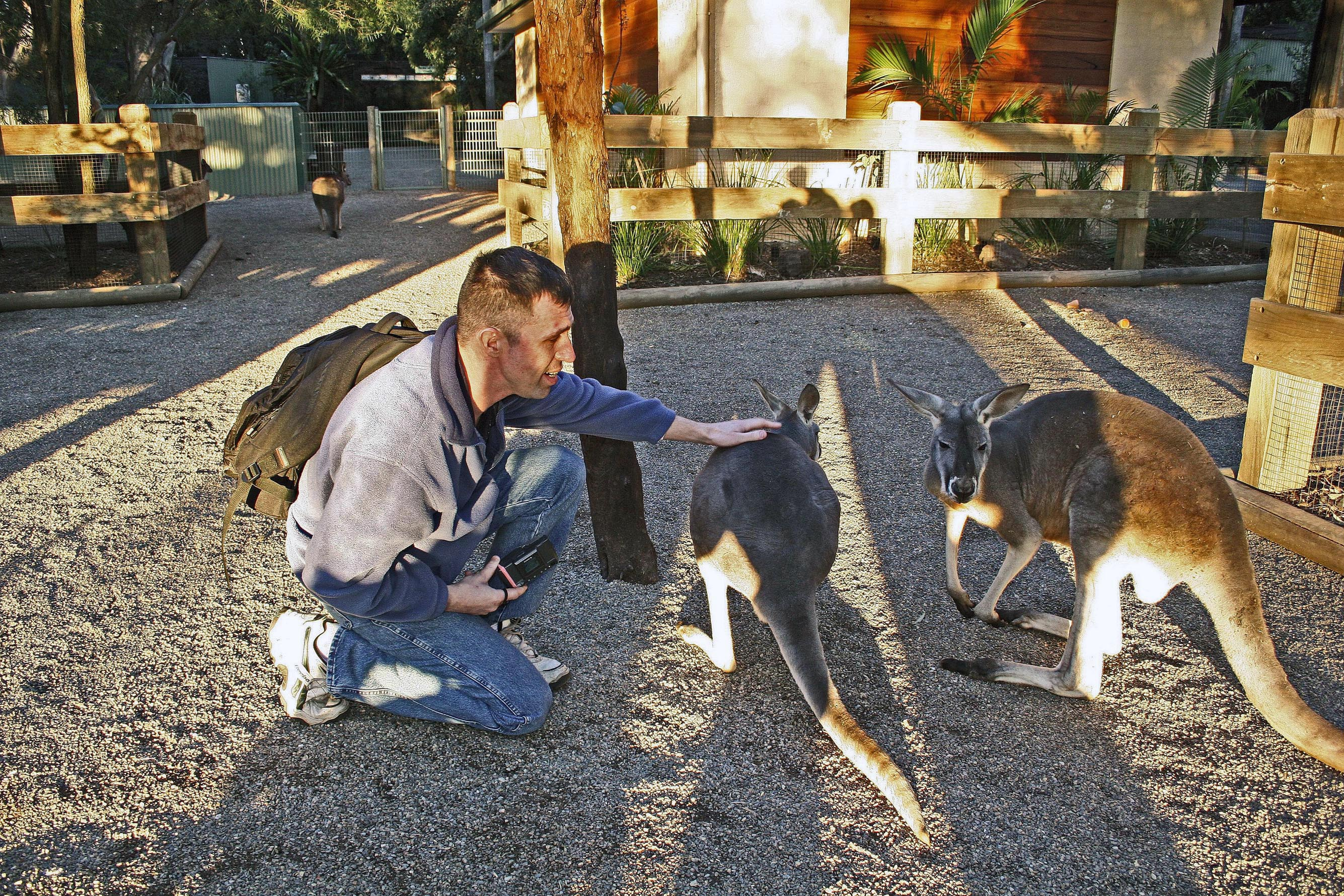
US visitor interacting with red kangaroos at the park

The wildlife park allows for up-close encounters with many different species. Interactive species encounters include kangaroo feeding and koala, penguin and quokka encounters.

Featherdale describes itself as such:

Featherdale is the largest exhibitor of native Australian fauna in the world, caring for over 1700 birds and animals on site, with more than 300 species of birds and animals being on display, including some of Australia's most iconic animal. Featherdale cares for the largest collection of koalas in the state and is an industry leader in the medical care of the species.

== Breeding, conservation and study contributions ==
Featherdale Wildlife Park has assisted in several breeding and conservation programs. These programs allow for a controlled understanding of species as the facility keeps captive species within strict diets and conditions. Featherdale Wildlife Park provided access, samples and related materials to these studies and reports.

=== Spotted-tailed quolls ===
Featherdale Wildlife Park contributed to a spotted-tailed quoll (also known as the tiger quoll) study conducted at the University of Wollongong. They provided the university with access to the breeding patterns of the captive specimens. The park also allowed for observations of the "growth and development of their young". The study resulted in a comparison of species that were in captivity in the park compared to wild populations in Sydney and around the NSW coastline. The park supplied quoll faeces samples to the University of New South Wales in 2005 to study odours and predators in various Critical Weight Range (CWR) marsupials. Quoll urine was provided to the "Ultraviolet properties of Australian mammal urine" study c. 2003.

=== Koalas ===
C. Staples from Featherdale Wildlife Park provided samples for a study on koalas, their genomes and the relationship with decreasing population numbers. A study of the genetic make-up of koalas and differences between captive and wild population was conducted with specialists from several major universities including the Queensland University of Technology and the University of New South Wales. Featherdale Wildlife Park allowed access to 11 animals containing seven individuals and four offspring.

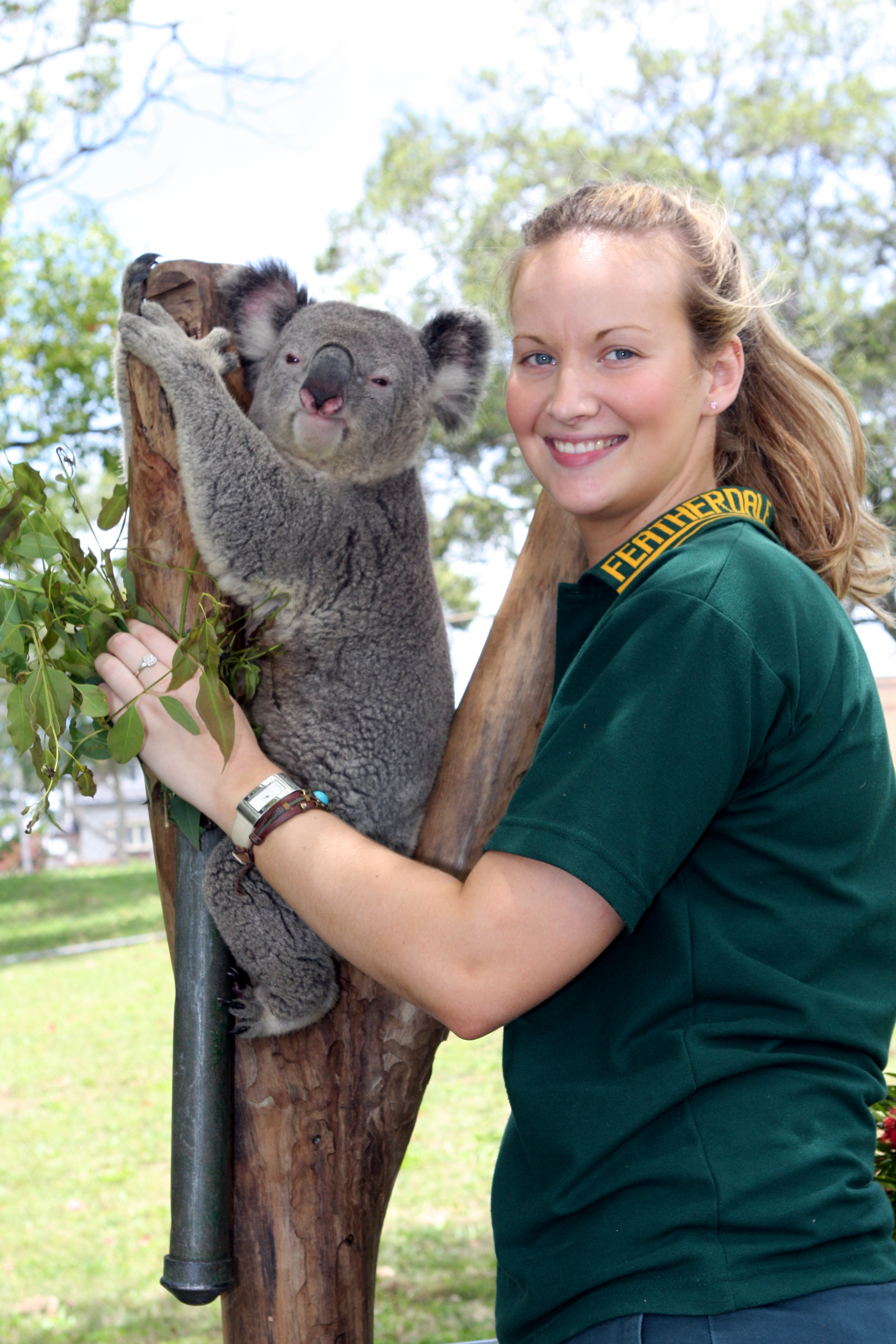
Koala at Featherdale Wildlife Park with park staff member

=== Short-beaked echidnas ===
In 2011, Featherdale Wildlife Park allowed researchers from the University of New South Wales to observe their echidnas, which were specified to be wild before captivity and were judged to be viewed in good health when observed. The park provided several faecal samples of their echidnas to assist in the analysis of long-term captive short-beaked echidnas.

=== Yellow-footed rock-wallabies ===
In 1997, Featherdale Wildlife Park contributed to a genetic study conducted by Macquarie University. The park provided samples for an analysis of the yellow-footed rock wallaby's DNA. The study provided links between issues the wallaby's DNA predisposed them to and their management in captivity.

=== Common wombats ===
Scat samples of common wombats were provided to the Western Sydney University to understand the impacts of stress and parasites. The samples provided insight into the basic biology of the wombats and the decline of their population.

=== Common brushtail possums and related predators ===
Featherdale Wildlife Park provided "fresh-frozen" owl pellets to study common brushtail possum behaviour.

== Thefts ==
=== Collett's snakes ===
On 18 October 2006, intruders broke into Featherdale Wildlife Park's reptile enclosure and stole four Collett's snakes.

=== Emu ===
In 2013, a five-year-old female emu was stolen around 13 February 2013. The emu was taken over the enclosure that was surrounded by an electric fence, over 1.8 metres (6 ft) in height.

=== Exotic birds ===
Over the Christmas period in 2012, a robbery resulted in the theft of ten exotic birds. The birds were of various species and included two blue-and-yellow macaws. The value of the theft was well in excess of $12,000. Police believed the birds, which are often kept as pets, were stolen to be sold on the black market or were given as Christmas gifts. All the birds were microchipped. Two of the ten stolen birds were recovered from a police raid on a house in Sydney's west where the birds were being kept as pets. The two birds were returned to the park and seemed to be in decent health, other than some signs of stress.

== Ownership and management ==
=== Ownership ===
Featherdale Wildlife Park is a privately owned enterprise that has declared that they receive no government funding or financial support. The ownership of Featherdale Wildlife Park has been transferred several times. In December 1996 it was purchased by Amalgamated Holding Limited (now Event Hospitality and Entertainment) owned Featherdale Wildlife Park as part of their investment in leisure and attractions for $5.5 million. In July 2013, it was purchased by Moss Capital for around AUD $15 million. It was reported that the management style and team, and cash flow attracted the current owners to its acquisition. Moss Capital later became the Elanor fund, which continues to hold the property. The Elanor Wildlife Park Fund was launched after the acquisition of Mogo Zoo, to potentially acquire further wildlife attractions.

=== Management ===
In 2014, Previous owners, Moss Capital, have stated that the style of management and team at the premises are a reason the park is an attractive asset and functioning business. The staff caring for the animals on the premises were in excess of 100 in 2013. There are approximately 73 staff at Featherdale Wildlife Park.

=== Profit ===
In 2013, Featherdale Wildlife Park produced an income of around $9.2 million. Elanor Investor Group claimed a profit of $2 million in the fourth quarter of 2020 when disclosing their earnings. They elaborated that Featherdale Wildlife Park had decreased the most in profit, relative to their other assets and went on to state that profit had begun to decline as a result of the border restrictions, impacts of the COVID-19 pandemic. Profits took a hit due to the park's high reliance on international and inter-state tourism.

=== Costs ===
In 2013, the total cost for the running of the premises was estimated at approximately $6.5 million, including the feeding and care of the animals. The costs of running Featherdale Wildlife Park are expensive, with the animal feeding costs estimating about $187,000 annually in 2013. In addition to feeding costs, the security of the park and the enclosures cost Featherdale Wildlife Park approximately $200,000 annually. General manager, Tim Sinclair-Smith, has stated that the profitability of the park as a business is required to run operations and to support breeding and conservation projects.

Due to the challenges of closures due to the COVID-19 pandemic and the lowering of profit levels, the park received part of the governments $95 million relief package for zoos and wildlife facilities. The relief package provided relief for costs due to the pressure of the breeding period combined with job losses.

=== Competition ===
Featherdale Wildlife Park operates under competition with other zoo and wildlife parks in Sydney. Featherdale Wildlife Park voiced objection to the construction of Sydney Zoo, stating that the zoo's location and facilities would create "social and economic issues". The NSW Planning Association looked into the impacts in a formal investigation, comparing the proposed development, Featherdale Wildlife Park and Taronga Zoo, another large zoo in Sydney. The report found that Sydney Zoo was very likely to impact the "high level of social engagement with the local community" and could possibly result in park closure, job loss and changes to the local community.

== Species ==
Birds
- Apostlebird
- Australasian figbird
- Australian barn owl
- Australian bustard
- Australian grass owl
- Australian king parrot
- Australian magpie
- Australian pelican
- Australian pied oystercatcher
- Australian raven
- Australian shelduck
- Australian white ibis
- Banded lapwing
- Banded rail
- Bar-shouldered dove
- Barking owl
- Black-breasted buzzard
- Black-breasted buttonquail
- Black-capped lory
- Black-faced woodswallow
- Black-necked stork
- Black-throated finch
- Blue-billed duck
- Blue-faced honeyeater
- Blue-faced parrot-finch
- Blue-winged kookaburra
- Blue-winged parrot
- Boobook owl
- Bourke’s parrot
- Brown cuckoo-dove
- Brown quail
- Budgerigar
- Bush bronzewing
- Bush stone-curlew
- Cape Barren goose
- Channel-billed cuckoo
- Chestnut rail
- Chestnut-breasted munia
- Chiming wedgebill
- Cloncurry parrot
- Cockatiel
- Common bronzewing
- Crested bellbird
- Crimson chat
- Crimson finch
- Diamond dove
- Diamond firetail
- Domestic chicken
- Domestic goose
- Double-barred finch
- Eastern cattle egret
- Eastern spinebill
- Eastern whipbird
- Elegant parrot
- Emerald dove
- Emu
- Eurasian skylark
- Flock bronzewing
- Galah
- Gang-gang cockatoo
- Glossy black-cockatoo
- Glossy ibis
- Golden pheasant
- Golden-shouldered parrot
- Gouldian finch
- Great egret
- Greater bluebonnet
- Greater sulphur-crested cockatoo
- Green catbird
- Grey-crowned babbler
- Grey shrike-thrush
- Hooded parrot
- Kelp gull
- King quail
- Laughing kookaburra
- Leadbeater's cockatoo
- Lesser sooty owl
- Little black cormorant
- Little blue penguin
- Little lorikeet
- Little pied cormorant
- Long-tailed finch
- Luzon bleeding-heart pigeon
- Magpie goose
- Malleefowl
- Masked lapwing
- Metallic starling
- Mulga parrot
- Musk lorikeet
- Nankeen kestrel
- Nankeen night heron
- Nicobar pigeon
- Noisy friarbird
- Noisy pitta
- Northern rosella
- Olive-backed oriole
- Osprey
- Pacific black duck
- Painted button-quail
- Paradise shelduck
- Peaceful dove
- Pheasant coucal
- Pied cormorant
- Pied stilt
- Plumed whistling-duck
- Powerful owl
- Princess parrot
- Purple-crowned fairywren
- Purple-crowned lorikeet
- Radjah shelduck
- Rainbow lorikeet
- Red lory
- Red-backed button-quail
- Red-browed finch
- Red-collared lorikeet
- Red-rumped parrot
- Red-tailed black-cockatoo
- Red-whiskered bulbul
- Regent bowerbird
- Regent honeyeater
- Rose-crowned fruit dove
- Royal spoonbill
- Rufous owl
- Sacred kingfisher
- Satin bowerbird
- Scaly-breasted lorikeet
- Scarlet myzomela
- Silvereye
- Southern cassowary
- Spinifex pigeon
- Spotted bowerbird
- Squatter pigeon
- Star finch
- Straw-necked ibis
- Stubble quail
- Superb blue wren
- Superb fruit-dove
- Superb lyrebird
- Swift parrot
- Tawny frogmouth
- Topknot pigeon
- Torresian imperial-pigeon
- Tricoloured munia
- Turquoisine
- Varied lorikeet
- Variegated fairywren
- White-bibbed ground dove
- White-breasted woodswallow
- White-browed woodswallow
- White-cheeked honeyeater
- White-faced heron
- White-headed munia
- White-headed pigeon
- White-naped honeyeater
- Wonga pigeon
- Yellow-tailed black cockatoo
- Yellow-tufted honeyeater
- Zebra finch
- the four species listed below are housed in off-display areas:
- Inland dotterel
- Little buttonquail
- Orange chat
- Plains wanderer
Herptiles (amphibians and reptiles)
- Alpine blue-tongued skink
- Australian red-eyed tree frog
- Black-headed python
- Blotched blue-tongued skink
- Boyd’s forest dragon
- Broad-headed snake
- Broad-shelled river turtle
- Brown tree snake
- Central netted dragon
- Centralian blue-tongued skink
- Centralian carpet python
- Collett’s snake
- Common death adder
- Crucifix frog
- Cunningham's skink
- Desert skink
- Diamond python
- Eastern Pilbara spiny-tailed skink
- Eastern snake-necked turtle
- Eastern water dragon
- Eastern water skink
- Frilled dragon
- Gidgee skink
- Inland taipan
- King's skink
- Lace monitor
- Major skink
- Northern Pilbara rock monitor
- Olive python
- Perentie
- Saltwater crocodile
- Sand goanna
- Stumptail skink
- Tiger snake
- Tree skink
Mammals
- Brush-tailed rock-wallaby
- Common brushtail possum
- Common wombat
- Dingo
- Domestic goat
- Domestic sheep
- Eastern grey kangaroo
- Eastern quoll
- Ghost bat
- Goodfellow's tree-kangaroo
- Greater bilby
- Kangaroo Island kangaroo
- Koala
- Long-nosed potoroo
- Parma wallaby
- Quokka
- Red-necked pademelon
- Red-necked wallaby
- Short-beaked echidna
- Southern hairy-nosed wombat
- Spotted-tailed quoll
- Tammar wallaby
- Tasmanian devil
- Yellow-bellied glider
- Yellow-footed rock wallaby
