= Central Gardens Nature Reserve =

Nature reserve in Sydney, Australia

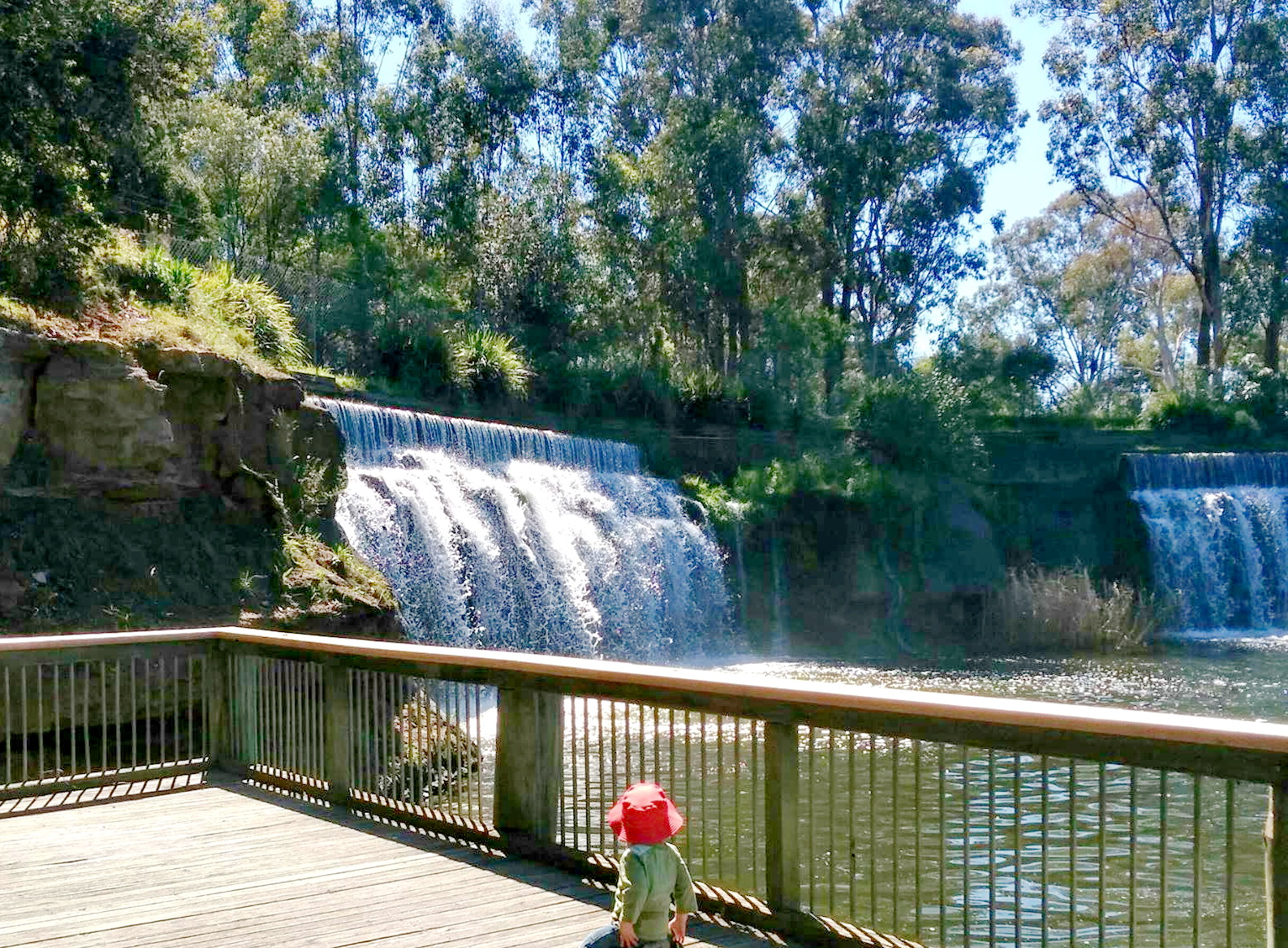
- The artificial waterfall at the boardwalk area
- Interactive map of Central Gardens Nature Reserve
- Type: Urban park; Fauna and wildlife park; Nature reserve
- Location: Cumberland Highway and Merrylands Road, Merrylands, Cumberland Council, Sydney, New South Wales, Australia
- Coordinates: 33°49′52″S 150°57′45″E
- Area: 12 hectares (30 acres)
- Opened: 12 April 1976
- Operator: Cumberland Council
- Open: 7:30am to 5pm
- Status: Open all year
- Facilities: Adventure playgrounds; Animal enclosures; Educational bush trails; Ponds and water features; Amphitheatre; Tennis court; Large open space grass areas; BBQ and picnic areas
- Website: www.cumberland.nsw.gov.au/central-gardens-nature-reserve

The Central Gardens Nature Reserve, also called Central Gardens, is a protected nature reserve and urban park located in the western suburbs of Sydney, New South Wales, Australia. Established in 1976, the 12-hectare (30-acre) reserve, garden and fauna and wildlife park is situated in the suburb of Merrylands and is managed by Cumberland Council. The park is regionally important and it attracts visitors outside the Cumberland local government area. The bushland contains remnants of Cumberland Plain Woodland and is approximately 3.5 hectares (8.6 acres).

== History ==
Before opening, the area was first used for clay extraction pits and kilns for brick making in the 1970s. The design of the park began at that time, with the tennis courts and grass area developed. The reserve was officially opened on 12 April 1976 by The Hon Tom Uren, the Deputy Leader of the Opposition at that time. Many trees were lost in the park as a result of a severe storm in February 2002. The boardwalk and deck structure was built in 1993, which was designed to allow disabled persons to access the edge of the main lake.

== Geography ==
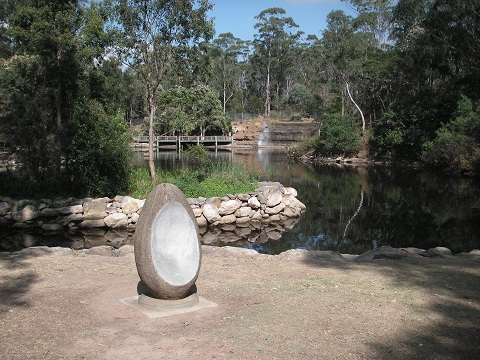
The main lake within the garden

The reserve is located between Merrylands Road, Paton Street and the Cumberland Highway in Merrylands. The park's landform is made up of two main topographic regions — The northern half slopes gently from Merrylands Road towards the system of lakes in the centre of the park, whilst the section of park's south of the lakes is largely flat, with a small localised rise in elevation opposite of Paton St.

Water is pumped from the main lake to an outlet near the Cumberland Highway. The quality of the lake is rather poor. Factors include silt laden runoff entering from adjacent areas, shallow waters, presence of marine animals and lack of reliable water supply to fill the lakes up during dry periods.

=== Flora ===
The vegetation of the gardens generally consist of a mixture of remnant indigenous vegetation and planted trees. The most significant area of remnant vegetation, known as Central Gardens Woodland, is located in the northwest corner of the park adjacent to the Cumberland Highway. The Woodland of the park is isolated from other significant areas of vegetation in the region.

A total of 78 native plant species have been observed in the reserve. The Reserve has vegetation species such as Bursaria spinosa, Eucalyptus moluccana, Melaleuca decora, Exocarpos cupressiformis, Lomandra filiformis, grey box, Eucalyptus crebra (narrow-leafed ironbark), Eucalyptus tereticornis (forest red gum), Bursaria spinosa (blackthorn), Dillwynia juniperina (prickly parrot-pea), Casuarina glauca (swamp oak) and Themeda australis. Exotic species include Ulmus parvifolia (Chinese elm) and Liquidambar styraciflua (sweet gum).

=== Fauna ===
Some of the animals in the park include kangaroos and wallabies, Australian white ibis, emus, waterfowl, wombats, and native birds, including cockatoos and cockatiels. Carps are found in the ponds, and also duck species such as the Pacific black duck, black swan, Emden goose, dusky moorhen and the Australian wood duck. The main habitat area within the gardens is the tree canopy, which is used by a range of bird species.

== Features ==
The natural bushland features walking tracks, boardwalk, kiosk, amphitheatre, fountains, ornamental lake system, bird and animal enclosures (fauna and aviary), also sports ground such as tennis courts and open fields. The reserve is a popular venue for wedding photos and company picnics. Yarrabee and Pinaroo areas may be hired for those large family or company picnics. Other features include hot water tank, sink, toilets, BBQs, picnic tables and dozens of shady trees. Concrete paths meander throughout the park.

The lake's water jets help with water aeration, whilst also providing a visual and auditory perspective. A major attribute of the reserve is the exposed sandstone rock face, formed during quarrying operations, when the site was used for brick making. Part of this cliff is used for a large (artificial) waterfall and is a conspicuous attraction in the park.

== Demographics ==
The 1989 survey indicated that the most popular form of recreation in the park was picnicking and barbequing (62%), with relaxing also a favoured activity (55%). 83% of visitors to the park arrive by car and 15% of visitors by foot. Peak times for visitation occurred between 12 noon and 2pm. The survey found that 56.7% of park users were not residents of the Cumberland local government area.

== Access ==
Bookings, which go through Cumberland Council, are required to access the tennis courts. Entry is free. Wheelchair access is available. Restricted access areas include the fenced woodland area, the animal enclosures and the works depot. The park is closed on Christmas Day and Good Friday.

== Gallery ==
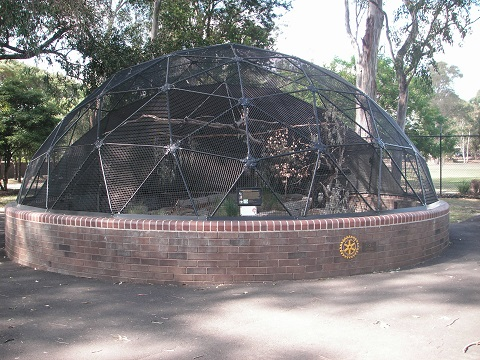
The aviary cage

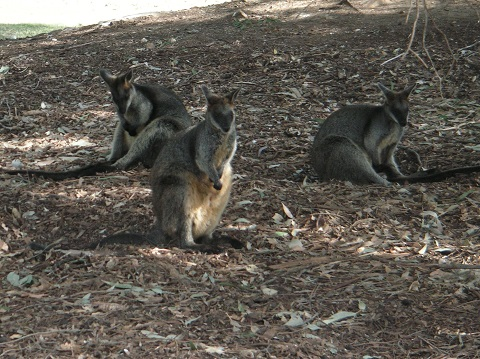
The fauna reserve with wallabies

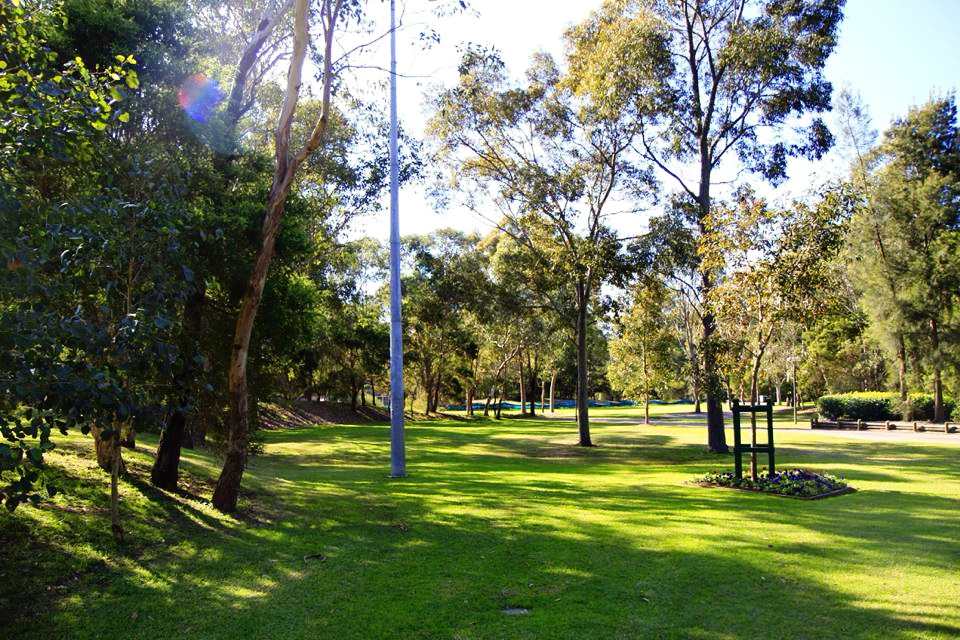
Grass and wood area

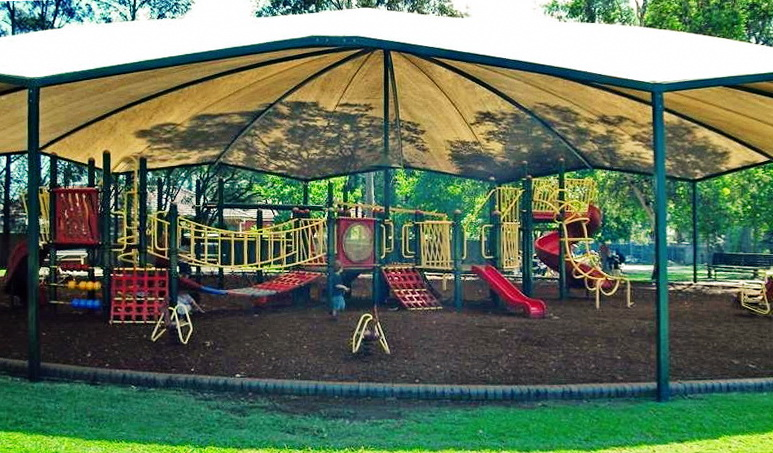
The park's playground

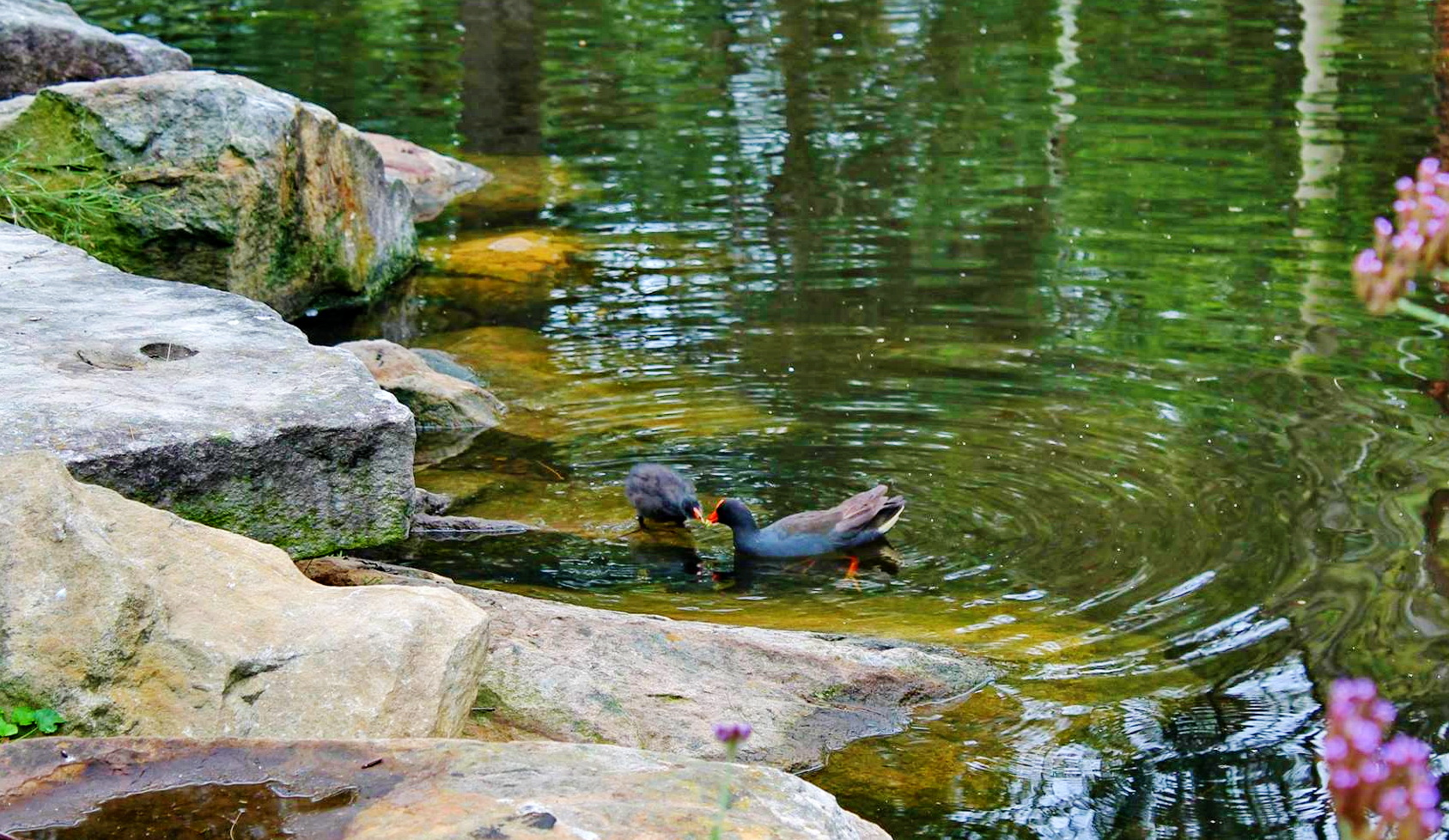
Dusky moorhens in a lake

== See also ==
- Auburn Botanical Gardens
- List of parks in Sydney
- Nurragingy Reserve
- Prospect Nature Reserve
- Protected areas of New South Wales
- Western Sydney Parklands
- Wetherill Park Nature Reserve
