= Mountain View Adventist College =

Location
- Doonside, Sydney, New South Wales; Australia; 33°46′08″S 150°52′20″E

Information
- Type: Independent co-educational primary and secondary day school
- Religious affiliation: Australian Union Conference of Seventh-day Adventists
- Denomination: Seventh-day Adventist
- Established: 1968; 58 years ago
- Principal: Jennifer M. Gibbons
- Slogan: Nurture for today. Learning for tomorrow. Character for eternity.
- Website: mvac.adventist.edu.au

Mountain View Adventist College is an independent Seventh-day Adventist co-educational primary and secondary day school, located in the western Sydney suburb of Doonside, New South Wales, Australia. It is a part of the Seventh-day Adventist education system, the world's second largest Christian school system.

== History ==
Mountain View Adventist College began in 1968 as a two-room primary school. It began to cater for Year 7–8 in 1983 and Year 10 by 1985. A Year 12 class was added in 1999. In 2004, the college began a pre-kindy class to cater for the needs of 4-year-olds.

== Curriculum ==
The schools' curriculum consists primarily of the standard courses taught at college preparatory schools across the world. All students are required to take classes in the core areas of English, Basic Sciences, Mathematics, a Foreign Language, and Social Sciences.

== Sports ==
The College offers basketball, soccer, volleyball, rugby, netball, swimming, Austag, touch football, tennis, and table tennis.

== See also ==
- List of non-government schools in New South Wales
- Seventh-day Adventist education
- List of Seventh-day Adventist secondary schools
