= Nurragingy Reserve =

Nature reserve in New South Wales, Australia

Nurragingy Nature Reserve
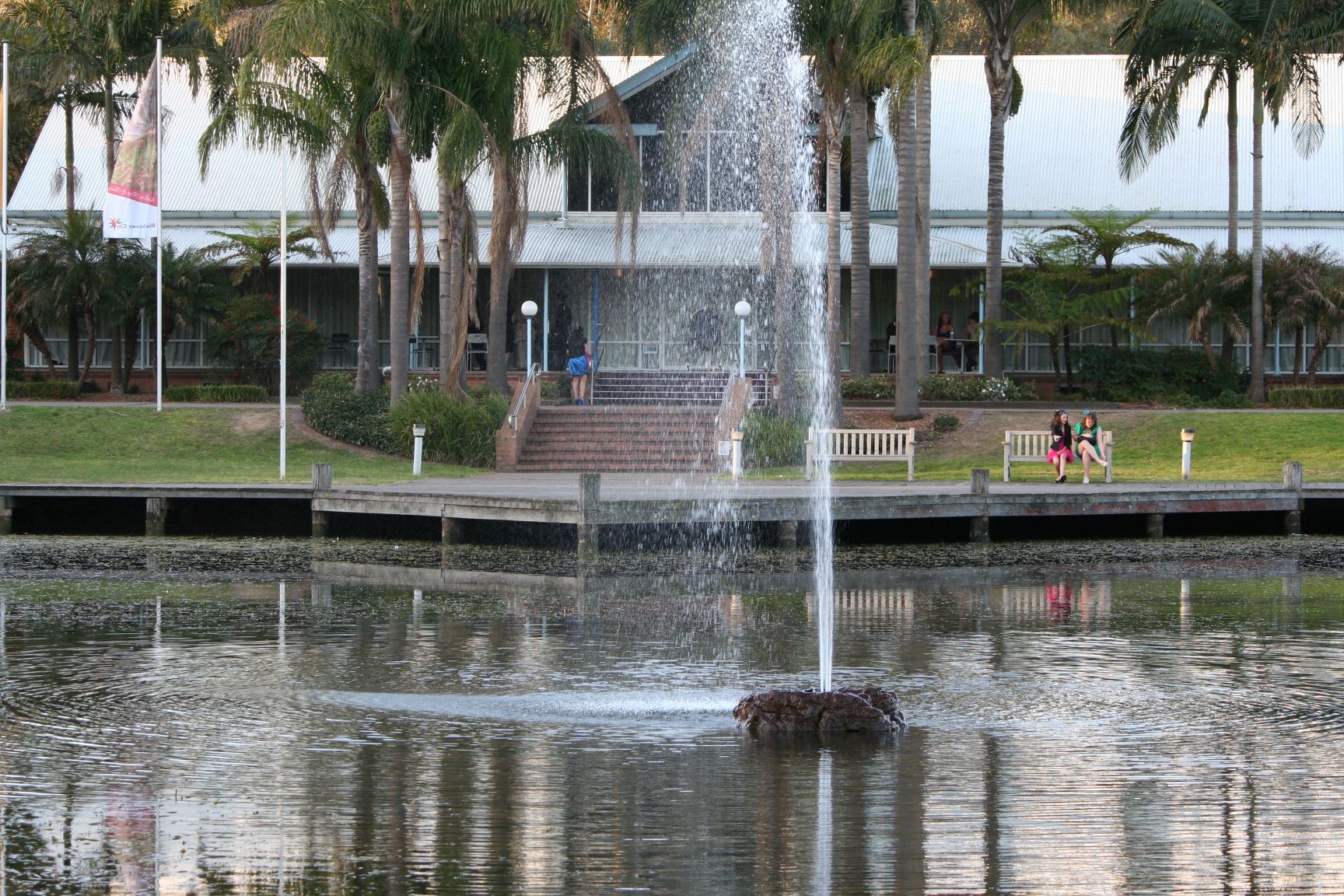
- The Colbee Centre at Nurragingy with outdoor landscaped area and fountain

- Location within New South Wales
- Type: Urban par and nature reserve
- Location: Doonside, New South Wales, Sydney
- Coordinates: 33°44′55″S 150°51′44″E
- Area: 90 hectares (222 acres)
- Opened: 1981
- Owner: Western Sydney Parklands Trust
- Operator: Blacktown City Council
- Status: Open all year
- Entrance: Knox Road, Doonside NSW 2767
- Website: Blacktown Council

The Nurragingy Nature Reserve is an Australian open urban park and nature reserve, it is a protected area owned by Western Sydney Parklands Trust and operated by Blacktown City Council that opened in 1981. The Nature Reserve is a site of state heritage significance because of its combination of historical, social and cultural values. The site was the first land grant ever given to Aboriginal people in Australia.

The landscaped park is complete with unique features including bridges, pavilions and waterfalls, a native wildlife park, Chinese garden, New Zealand Garden, BBQ and picnic area and large conference centre for business meetings, weddings and other varying functions, it is a popular tourist attraction located in Knox Rd, Doonside and Rooty Hill, New South Wales.

== History ==
Nurragingy Nature Reserve's namesake commemorates one of two early colonial Indigenous Australians of the Dhaarak tribe who were given a land grant by Governor Lachlan Macquarie, the other "Colebee", was given to the convention centre within the reserve. This grant is associated with two significant Aboriginal figures from the early colonial period – Nurragingy and Colebee – to whom the land was jointly granted in 1816. The location of the land grant is significant because it was an Aboriginal choice, being on land belonging to Nurragingy's clan. The land grant is valued by the contemporary Aboriginal community and the wider Australian community as a landmark in the history of cross-cultural engagement in Australia. For Aboriginal people, in particular, it represents a key historical site symbolising Aboriginal resilience and enduring links to the land (Godden, Mackay, Logan, 2010).

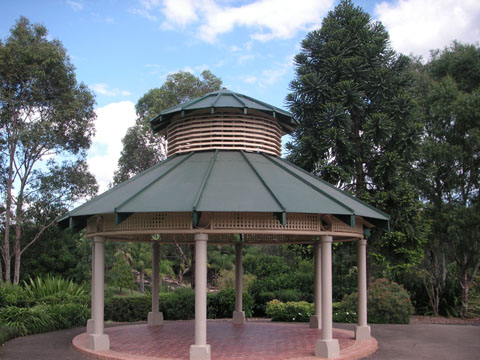
Bungarribee Pavilion in the Nurragingy Nature Reserve

A painting by local Aboriginal artist Danny Eastwood, depicting this land grant hangs inside the Colebee Centre.

Prior to the 1970s the land was part of the Cumberland Timber Forest which was a supplier of commercial timber. In the 1970s the land was purchased by the New South Wales State Government with the intention of turning it into a green belt for Western Sydney which was facing rapid expansion. In 1981 the state government allowed a portion of the land to be used as a recreational area.

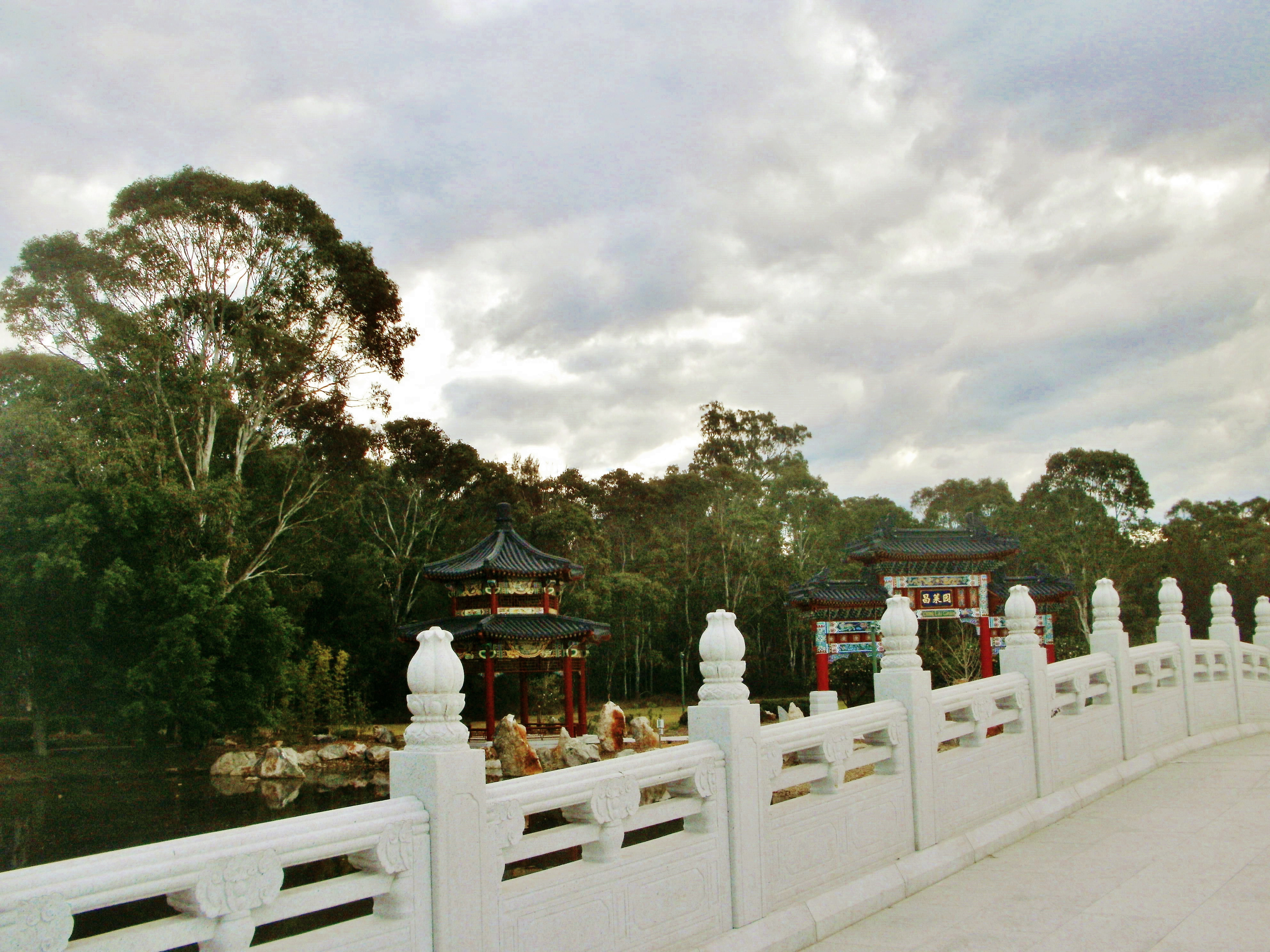
Nurragingy Chinese Garden

== Flora ==
The surrounding vegetation contains a number a vulnerable and regionally specific species such as Shale-Gravel Transition Forest, Alluvial Woodland and Shale Plain Woodland as a part of a Grey Box and Forest Red Gum woodland. Cabbage Gum's, Casuarina glauca and Melaeuca spp. are present in the creeks and ponds. The shrub layer includes Bursaria spinosa, Acacia decurrens and Dillwynia juniperina. The reserve is home to many herbs and grasses as well as wetland species around the creek and streambanks.

== Chang Lai Yuan Chinese Gardens ==
On 14 October 2003, Liaocheng municipality (Located in China) and Blacktown City council signed a sister city agreement. In May 2011, to foster ties of friendship and economic partnership the two municipalities signed a memorandum of understanding relating to the construction of an authentic Chinese garden at Nurragingy Reserve. It was officially opened in August 2012. The name of the park is derived from a portmanteau of Dongchang (The former name of the Chinese municipality) and the Chinese translation of Blacktown (Bu Lai Ke Cheng).

The garden is styled with elements from both the Ming Dynasty and Qing Dynasty and includes a Gateway, Seven Arch Stone Bridge, Light Mountain Pavilion and a Waterfall Gazebo.

== Gallery ==
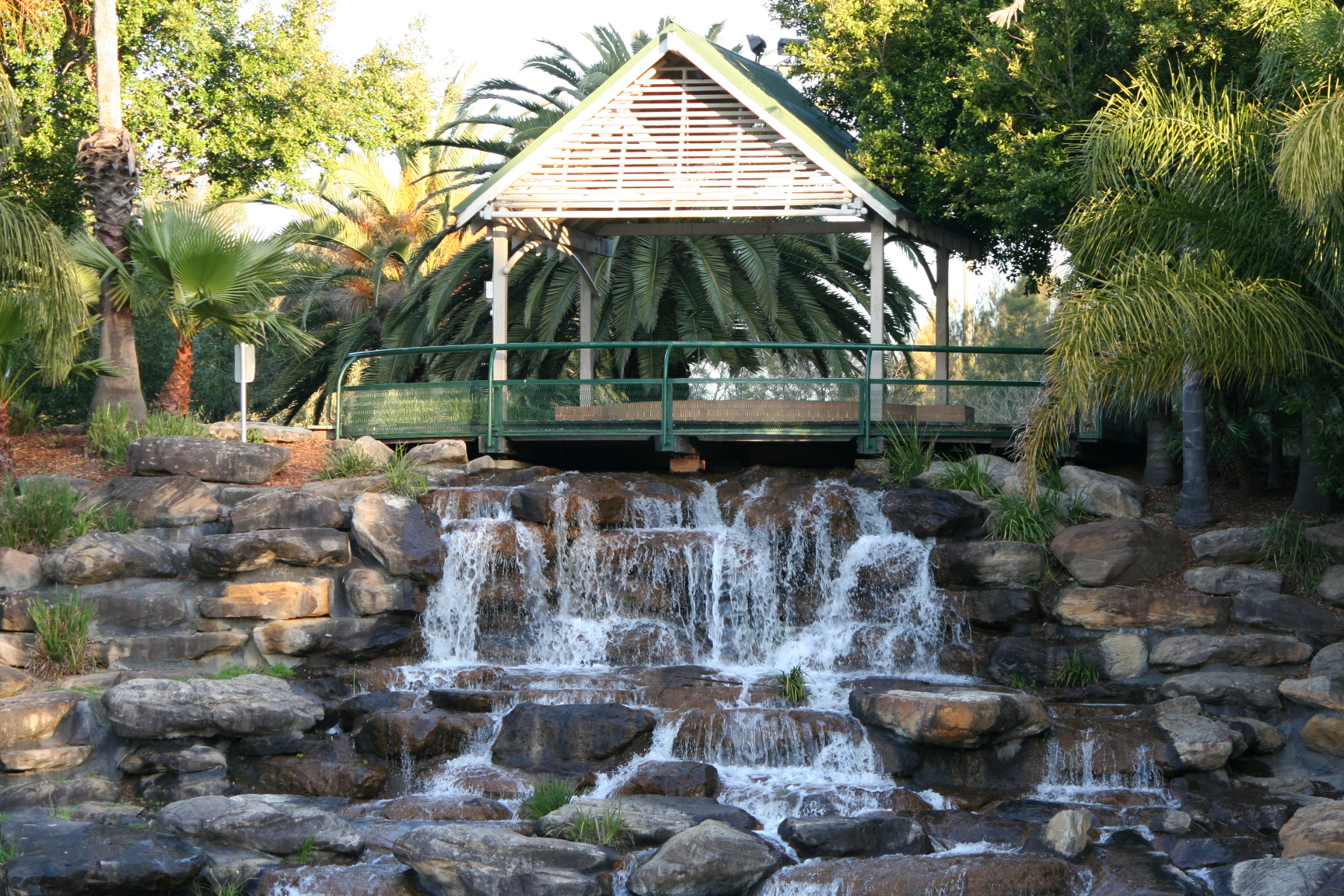
Nurragingy Waterfall

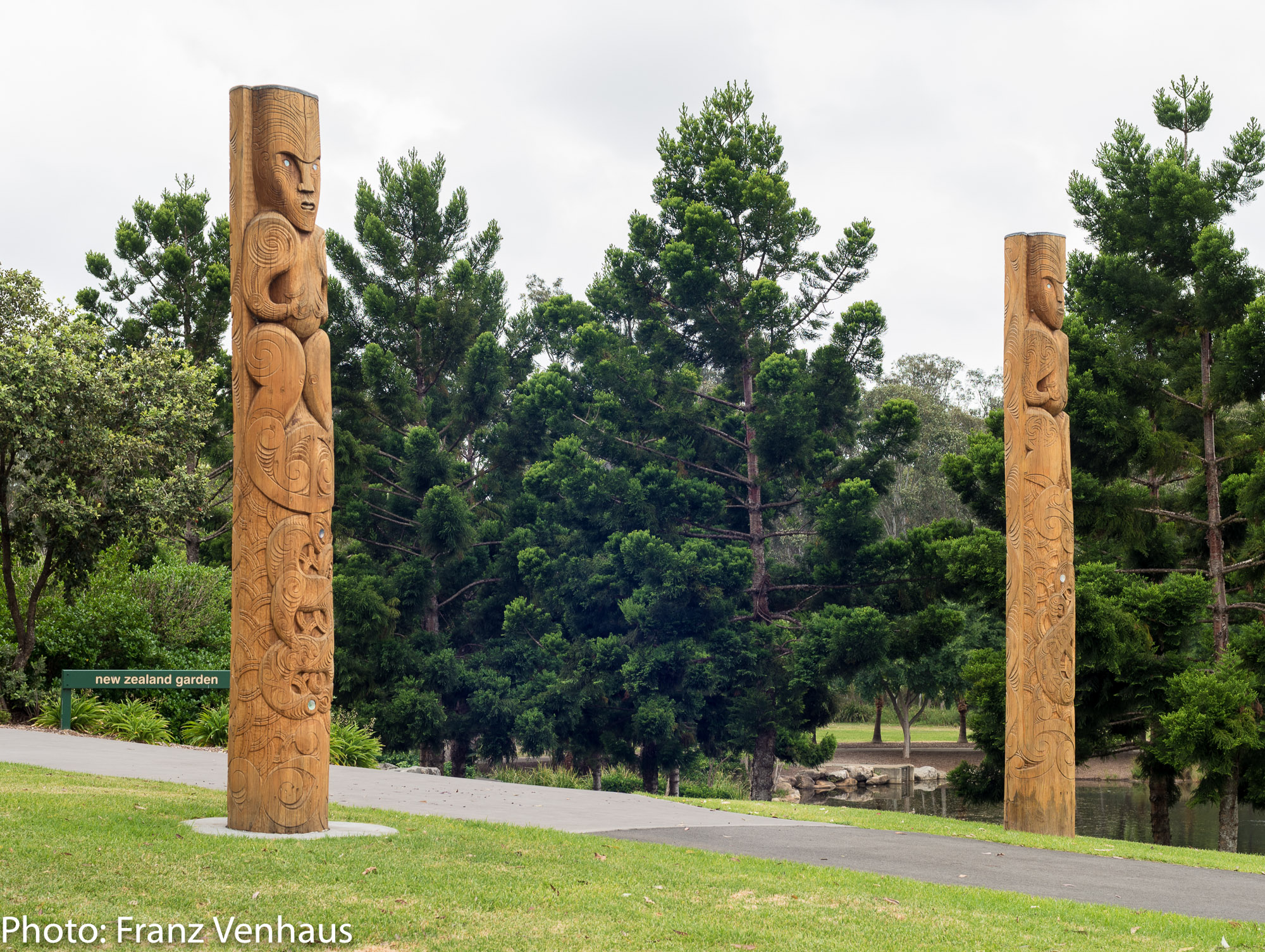
Nurragingy New Zealand Garden

== See also ==
- Auburn Botanical Gardens
- Central Gardens Nature Reserve
- Brenan Park
- Rosford Street Reserve
