= Doonside, New South Wales =

Doonside
- Suburb
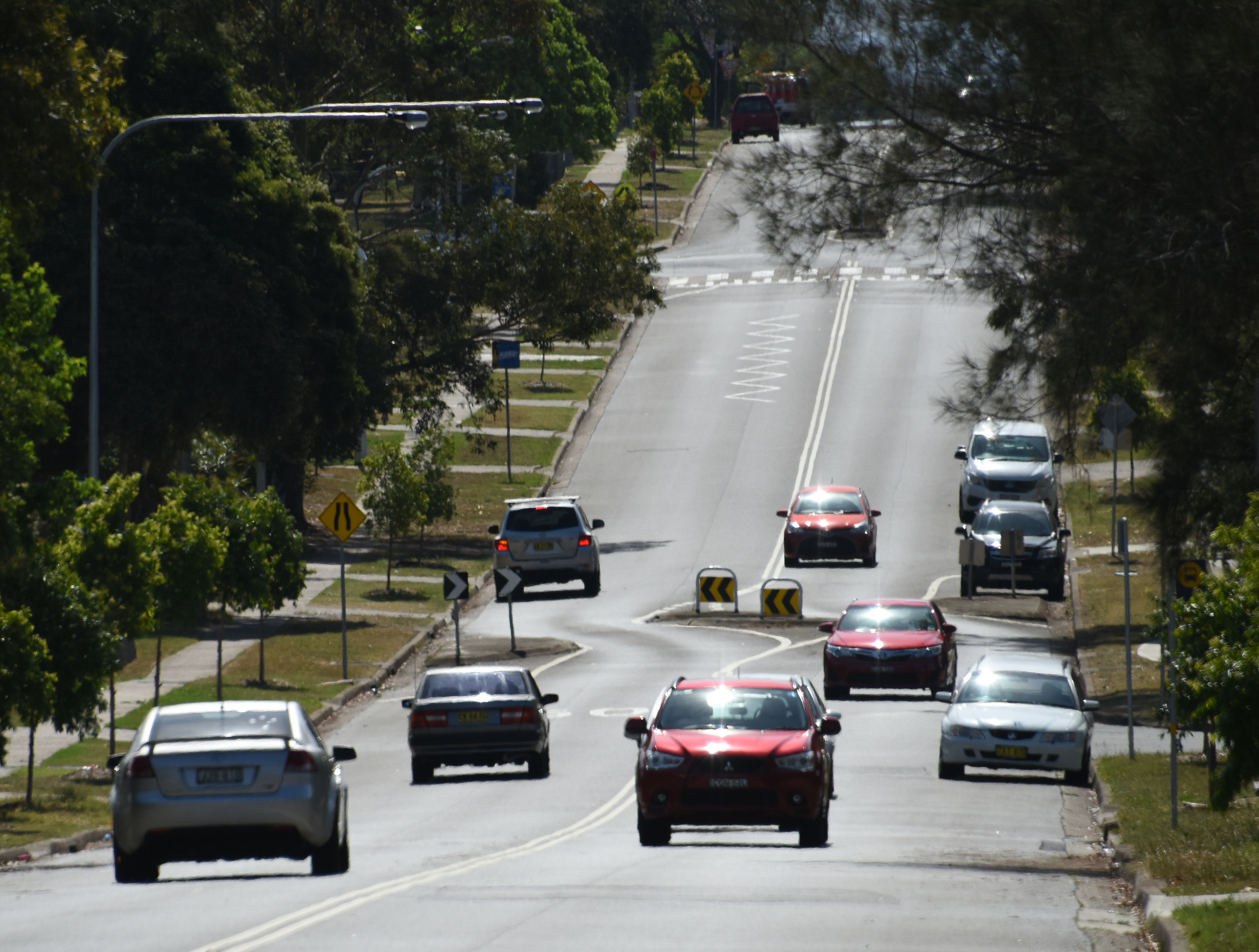
- Kildare Road, Doonside

- Interactive map of Doonside
- Coordinates: 33°46′10″S 150°52′00″E
- Country: Australia
- State: New South Wales
- City: Sydney
- LGA: City of Blacktown
- Location: 40 km (25 mi) west of Sydney CBD
- Established: 1929

Government
  - State electorate: Blacktown
  - Federal divisions: Chifley; McMahon
- Elevation: 43 m (141 ft)

Population
  - Total: 13,614 (2021 census)
- Postcode: 2767
Suburbs around Doonside
Glendenning	Quakers Hill	Woodcroft
Rooty Hill	Doonside	Blacktown
Eastern Creek	Huntingwood	Arndell Park

Doonside is a suburb in the metropolis of Sydney, in the state of New South Wales, Australia. Doonside is located 40 kilometres (25 mi) west of the Sydney central business district, in the local government area of the City of Blacktown and is part of the Greater Western Sydney region. Featherdale Wildlife Park and the Nurragingy Nature Reserve are popular local tourist attractions.

== History ==
The traditional owners and early settlement

The Dhurug people are the traditional owners of the local land. The area now known as Doonside was named 'Bungarribee' (Bung meaning the 'creek' and garribee meaning 'cockatoo').

In 1802, Governor Philip Gidley King reserved a large proportion of land for a Government Stock Reserve. For the next twenty years the land was used as grazing land for cattle and sheep by convict herdsmen. In 1822 part of the Government stock run was granted by Governor Thomas Brisbane to Scottish immigrant, Robert Crawford. Robert first named his 1,000 acres (4.0 km^{2}) Milton before renaming it "Hill End". In 1826, John Crawford purchased land adjacent Hill End fronting Richmond Road which he named Doonside. The region had various names, before officially becoming Doonside.

Robert James Crawford (1799–1848) had four children with Mary Campbell (d. 1832): Mary Crawford (b. 1826), Robert Crawford (1827–1906), George Canning Crawford (b. 1828), and Agnes C. Crawford (b. 1831). (Robert Crawford's four children's names are used today at Crawford Public School as sporting house teams). The elder Robert Crawford married Miss Jones of Bligh Street, Sydney, in 1832.

Robert Crawford (1827–1906) married Victoria Margaret Smyth in 1868. Their son, Robert (1868–1930), born in the same year became a published poet.

Bungarribee House

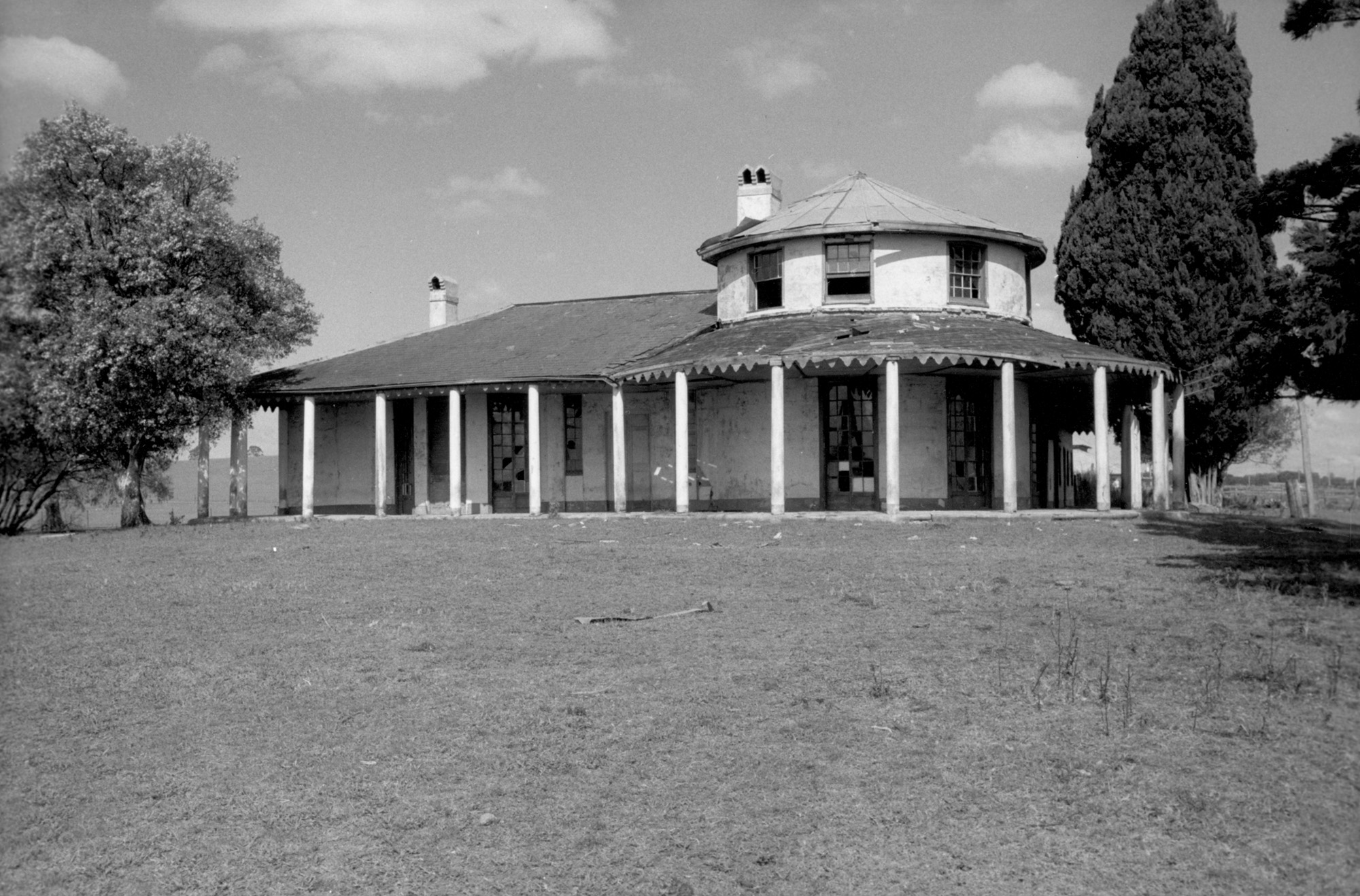
Bungarribee Homestead, 1954 Doonside

In 1822, the area south of Hill End (Doonside) was granted to a Scottish-born settler named John Campbell (1771–1827).

The property and house had a series of owners and tenants in the 19th and 20th centuries until acquired by the Commonwealth Overseas Telecommunications Commission (O.T.C.) in 1949.

The newly formed National Trust had been trying to secure a lease from O.T.C. but could not agree, citing unworkable lease conditions. A Local Historian, John Lawson, offered to restore the house but was rejected by O.T.C. The house was demolished in 1958.

Doonside Railway and Station

The Main Western railway line arrived with a single line to Rooty Hill opening on 23 December 1861, there was no station official but the rail siding was known as Crawford siding. Doonside railway station was officially opened on 27 September 1880. Electric trains arrived at Doonside station in 1955. Edith Crawford, from the founding family and the oldest inhabitant, was privileged to 'cut the ribbon.' Her death was in 1956.

In 1913, Doonside's dark platforms were illuminated only by the train guard's lamp. Intending passengers had to signal the driver if they wanted the train to stop so they could board. Toilets were erected on the platform in 1922.

The present station was upgraded in 1955, replacing the original buildings. The design of the station buildings applied the railway Stripped Functionalist style, as was done at other stations between Lidcombe and St. Mary's. During World War II, the station was one part of a much larger scheme to increase the tracks to four main lines between Lidcombe and St. Mary's to provide maximum track capacity to the American ammunition and general store built at Ropes Creek. Quadruplication was completed in 1981.

A signal box was incorporated into the 1955 building but closed in 1963 when automatic boom gates were provided at an adjacent level crossing, which was removed in 1980. The signal box equipment has been removed.

The pedestrian bridge that provides access to the platforms was built in 1958. Its twin beam construction is typical of 1940s footbridges on the Western line quadruplication. Since 1990, every bridge component, except the steel structure, has been replaced.

Wolkara

The Doonside name was changed briefly in 1921 to an Aboriginal name Wolkara, when the new railway station was being constructed, at Crawford rail siding. Wolkara was also the name of the post office that opened here in 1921, but in April 1929 it was changed back to Doonside, after local residents protested at the name change.

At the time of World War I

Prior to 1916, the only development at Doonside was confined to the Crawford family. The Crawford homestead and acreage block was on the south side of the railway line facing Doonside Road. Kelburn Crawford's daughter's house was between the homestead and Bungarribee. North of the line on the corner of Hillend Road and Doonside Crescent, was a brick cottage owned by the Italian family, Luparno. Opposite was a small gatekeeper's cottage.

A brick home, owned by another Crawford daughter, was in Doonside Crescent. Properties fronted Hillend Road and were owned by Crawford children. Another cottage in Hillend Road was owned by the family named Harrison, in-laws to the Crawford children. A workman's timber cottage was on the hill towards the tileworks' site.

The only road into Doonside was Doonside Road, running from Western Highway. Hillend Road only went as far as Power Street after which there was a track to Richmond Road ending in a gate. Power Street went to Plumpton with the crossing over Eastern Creek being rough and dangerous in wet weather.

After the war (1914–1918), the company of Porter and Galbraith bought property from Crawford and erected a tileworks (PGH) in an area which is now the suburb of Woodcroft. A soldier's settlement of about twenty poultry farms was established between the railway line and Bungarribee Road. Part of this land, during the 1930s depression, became a woman's settlement.

Early Doonside

There was no electricity until 1929 and water was drawn from wells. Horse-drawn carts would deliver bread and meat. Blacktown was accessed by train as there were not any buses or schools. Parramatta and Penrith, were the nearest high schools.

A store and post office were opened unofficially in 1926 by Bill Francis on the corner of Hillend Road and Cross Street. For some years his nephew Jack Francis operated the post office on the other side of the railway line but once it was made official it returned to its original site until 1987.

Suburb development

In 1912, twelve hundred acres of the Bungarribee estate were carved into eight to twenty-acre lots. In 1919 Directly south of the station was set aside for returning soldiers. 1923 was the first of many major subdivisions, the Doonside Station Estate subdivision [Hill End Estate] was advertised for those who wished to secure a home or business site. The Subdivision extended from the Station north to Power street. 1931 the Crawford Estate was subdivided from Power Street up to Richmond Road, and again in the 1970s. After the PGH was closed the Suburb of Woodcroft was built on the site in the early 1990s. The suburb of Bungarribee was developed in the 2000s.

== Heritage listings ==
Doonside has a number of heritage-listed sites, including:

- Doonside Road: Bungarribee Homestead Site

== Demographics ==
Doonside's population was 13,614 in the 2021 Australian census. Aboriginal and Torres Strait Islander people made up 4.7% of the population.

There was a mix of housing tenures in the suburb with 21.6% of properties owned outright, 30.6% being purchased and 43.6% being rented. The median household income of $1,340 per week was slightly lower than average and while the median rent ($310 per week) was also lower than average, the median mortgage repayment of $1,950 per month was higher. The most common industry of employment was hospitals (4.3%).

48.1% of people were born in Australia. The next most common countries of birth were Philippines 10.5%, India 6.5%, Fiji 3.3%, New Zealand 2.3% and Nepal 1.4%. The most common ancestries were Australian 18.8%, English 16.8%, Filipino 13.1%, Indian 6.2% and Australian Aboriginal 4.2%. 47.2% of people spoke only English at home. Other languages spoken at home included Tagalog 6.6%, Arabic 4.0%, Hindi 3.7%, Punjabi 3.2% and Filipino 3.0%. The most common responses for religion were Catholic 28.5%, No Religion 16.8% and Hinduism 9.4%.

== Notable people ==
Notable residents include:

- Stephen Bali, politician
- Si Yi Chen, convicted drug trafficker, member of Bali Nine
- Robert Crawford (1868–1930), poet
- Hooligan Hefs, rapper
- Craig Moore, soccer player
- Mark Winterbottom, race car driver

== Transport ==
Doonside railway station is on the Main Western railway line. The Great Western Highway runs along the southern border and the M4 (Sydney) is just to the south. Busways offers a number of bus services in the suburb including:

- route 753 from Doonside station to Blacktown station through the north of the suburb;
- routes 725/726 from Doonside to Blacktown station through the south of the suburb.
- route 756 from Blacktown to Mount Druitt, passing through the north of Doonside and providing connections with suburbs such as Woodcroft, Glendenning, Plumpton and Rooty Hill.

== Schools ==
Doonside is home to two government run primary schools, Doonside Public School, near the station, and Crawford Public School, on Power Street in the north of the suburb. Not far from Crawford is Doonside Technology High School, a government run high school. There are two non-government schools in Doonside. Mountain View Adventist College, on Doonside Road south of the railway line, is run by the Seventh-day Adventist Church and caters for students from Kindergarten to Year 12. St John Vianneys Primary School is a diocesan Catholic school associated with the neighbouring church, also called St John Vianney's

Doonside Public School

A 'Provisional' school was opened in 1903 but closed due to lack of support. It was reopened again in 1911 for two years. In 1937 Doonside Primary School was opened.

The first application for the school was made to Blacktown Shire Council on 28 May 1934. It was unsuccessful because Council felt that Blacktown School was big enough to accommodate students and that there was a train service from Doonside to Blacktown. In March and November 1935 it was again applied for but declined for the same reasons. But after much consideration, approval was finally given on 14 July 1936 for a public school. An area of 4 acres 3 perches had been resumed for this purpose.

The government Architect prepared plans and invited tenders (quote) for building the school. Mr S W Brown was accepted with the quote of 1,850 pounds. The building was completed and opened on 22 November 1937 with Mr Oscar Swanson as teacher.

The first weeks enrolment was 53 by the end of term there were 58.

1939 saw the number of pupils increase to 94. By 1956 there were 202 and in 1962 the number had reached 600. The numbers continued to grow due to the development of the area as new estates and housing were established.

Doonside Technology High School

The High School was opened in 1964 as Doonside High School. The School became a Technology High School in 1989.

Crawford Public School Opened 1977

St John Vianneys Primary School Opened 1986

== Crime ==
Crime is a major problem in Doonside. Safety is a large concern for residents of Doonside; statistics from the Blacktown City Council show that only 28% of residents in Doonside feel safe walking down their own street, with crime and community safety being ranked as the biggest challenges faced by locals.

Doonside is a hub for many street gangs.

== Recreation ==
On the western edge of Doonside lies the Nurragingy Reserve, which is situated in the Western Sydney Regional Parklands. The Reserve is a 90ha park featuring picnic grounds and original bushland. It was established a nature reserve in 1981 and named after Nurragingy, a Darug man given a land grant in the Blacktown area in 1819. Just south of the railway line is the Featherdale Wildlife Park, a private zoo established in 1953 and specialising in Australian native animals and birds.

Across the railway line from Nurragingy is Kareela Reserve, a sporting complex, home to a number of local sporting teams including the Doonside Roos rugby league team, Doonside Cricket Club and Doonside Little Athletics. The Doonside Hawks soccer club, the junior club of former Socceroos Captain Craig Moore, plays out of Glendenning Reserve in neighbouring Glendenning while the Doonside Diamonds Netball Club play all their games (home and away) at the Blacktown City Netball Association complex in Blacktown. All these clubs use maroon and white as their colours.

=== Doonside Junior Rugby League Club ===
The Rugby League Club Doonside Roos was founded in 1967 and its first committee meeting was held at the Doonside Hotel. The Colours of maroon and white and an embolem of a leaping Kangaroo were choosing to represent the club. The first games were played in the season of 1968 at Doonside High School's oval until a permanent home ground of Kareela Reserve (Kareela East Reserve) was completed. Games were played on Bert Sanders Reserve near Feathedale Wildlife Park one year due to the amenities at Kareela being destroyed in a fire.

1971 the club won its first premiership.

=== Doonside Cricket Club ===
Doonside Cricket Club was established in 1975. Games are played on Kareela Reserve (Kareela East Reserve).

=== Doonside Hawks Soccer Club ===
The soccer club was founded in 1981. The club's first home ground was to be Kareela West Reserve Doonside (today Charlie Bali Reserve) but was not completed in time for the inaugural season, so game were played at Mt Druitt Sports Centre until it was finished. Today the club's home ground is Glendenning Reserve of Richmond Road Glendenning.

=== Featherdale Wildlife Park ===
Featherdale Wildlife Park is a wildlife and zoo facility located in Doonside. It covers 3.29 hectares and has over 260 species on display and for interactive experiences.
