= Auburn Botanic Gardens =

Botanical gardens in Sydney, Australia

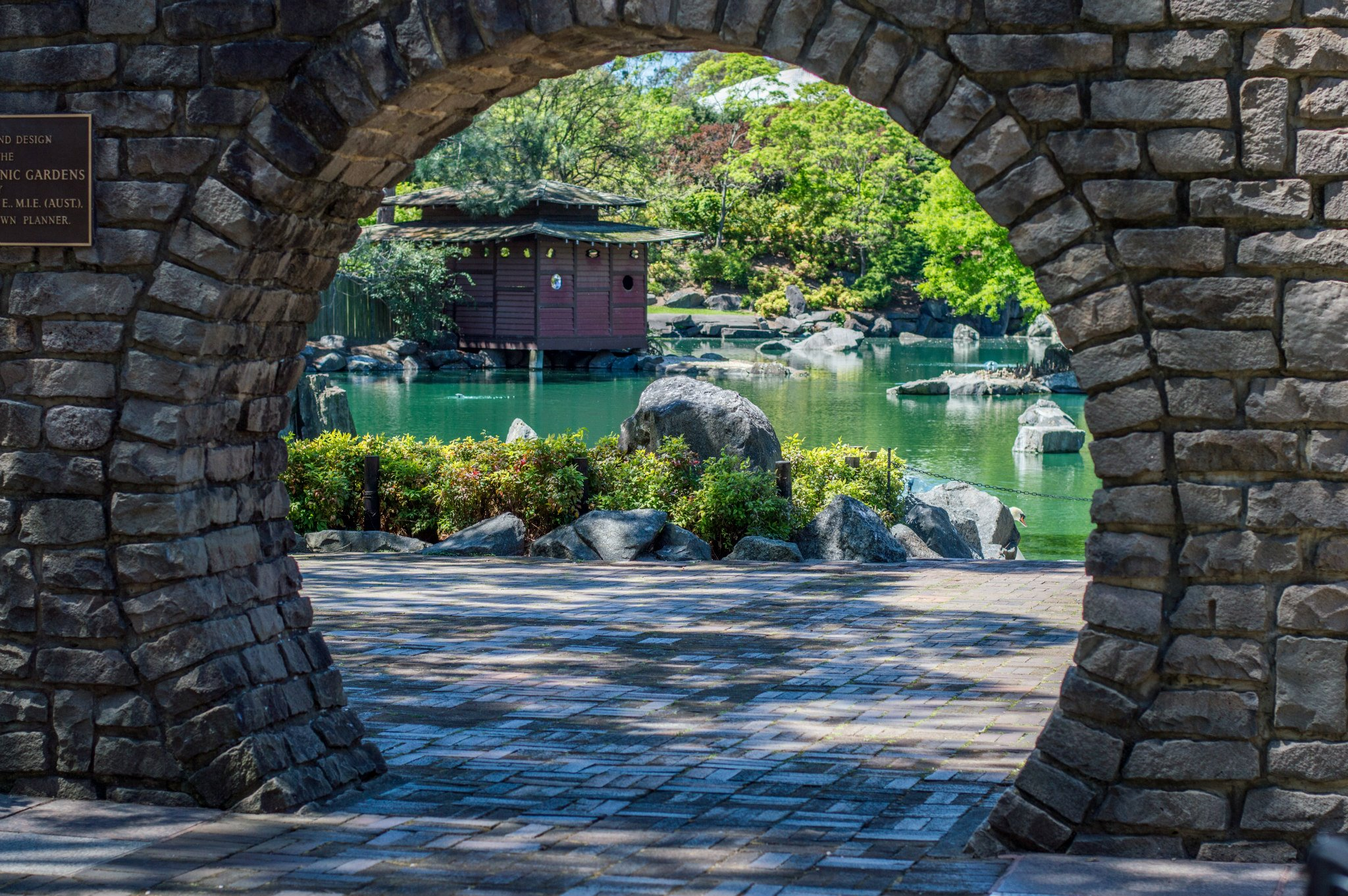
- The park's main lake from the entrance
- Interactive map of Auburn Botanic Gardens
- Type: Botanical, fauna, forest, wildlife park, nature reserve
- Location: Auburn, New South Wales, Australia
- Coordinates: 33°51′31.54″S 151°1′2.38″E
- Area: 13.1 hectares (32 acres)
- Opened: 1977
- Owner: Cumberland Council
- Visitors: 200,000 to 250,000
- Status: Open all year
- Website: www.cumberland.nsw.gov.au/auburn-botanic-gardens

The Auburn Botanic Gardens are a botanical garden located in Auburn (a suburb of Sydney), New South Wales, Australia. It was established in 1977 and covers an area of 9.7 hectares (24 acres). There are two lakes, a waterfall and bridges. Duck River winds through the garden. The garden is maintained by Cumberland Council. It is open daily, and there is a small entry fee on weekends. The Japanese gardens, which have hosted couples from overseas, are one of the main attractions.

The Auburn Botanic Gardens attract thousands of visitors each year, including a significant number from outside Australia, who come to enjoy the surrounds of the gardens, which provide a variety of flora and fauna. The topography of the site, which slopes gently towards the Duck River, has been altered to create different perspectives and microclimates. Three habitats are intended to provide an experience of Australia in the city – the woodlands theatre, the native garden and billabong, and the Australian rainforest. The gardens were opened by New South Wales governor Sir Roden Cutler on 11 September 1977.

== History ==
Prior to construction, the area was mined for clay tile production early in the 1900s. The area was then used as a waste landfill site. These soils were eventually excavated to create the hills and lakes that now lie in the gardens. The gardens were designed by Eric Black, chief engineer of Auburn Municipal Council from 1949 to 1979. Community groups have added a bonsai garden and an aviary to the basic plan. The native fauna reserve, set up in consultation with Taronga Zoo, is a later addition by the council's parks and gardens department.

The gardens owe their origin to the County of Cumberland planning scheme (1946–1951) which set aside the area along the banks of the Duck River for recreation. Both before and after the scheme, the council dumped rubbish and sewage along the banks and in brick and tile clay-pits for many years. In July 1968, Black presented a detailed report to the council on proposing a mixture of sporting grounds and intensive cultivation of the Duck River parklands. Black envisaged a series of gardens representing national styles from around the world. This vision was later reduced, though some elements survived, including the Japanese gardens and lake, the formal gardens and reflection pool, and the different Australian habitats.

Construction work on the Botanic Gardens site began in 1969 and involved the excavation of the Japanese Gardens Lake. In 1973, hundreds of trees were planted in the Avenue of Remembrance, Garden of Trees and Woodland area. The next crucial step was when the Whitlam government (1972–1975) pioneered federal government recognition of local government through direct funding. Through the regional development program, Auburn Council received funding in 1974 and 1975–76 to develop the gardens.

== Environment ==
=== Flora ===
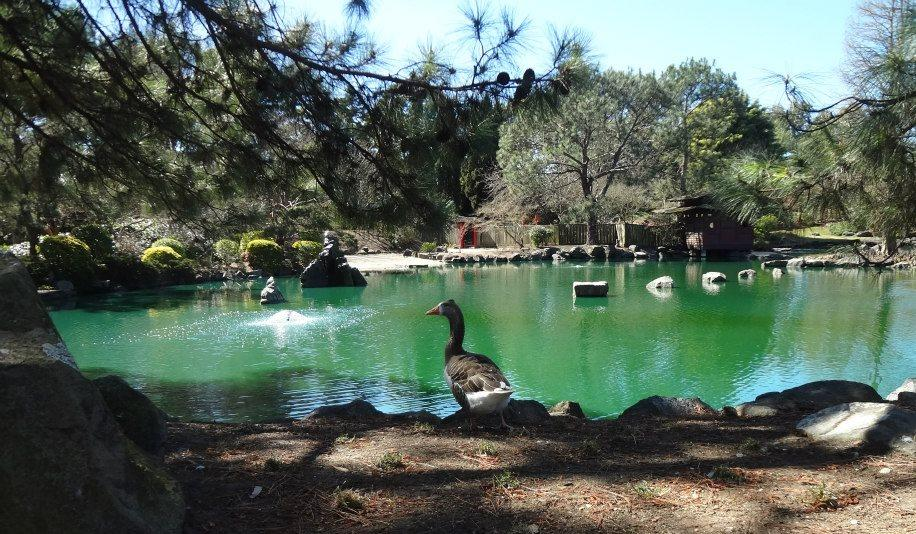
The environmental make up of the gardens

The gardens have matured since their opening, to the extent that some areas have had to be replanted after maturing trees and plants came to the end of their life cycles. The New South Wales National Parks and Wildlife Branch of the Department of Environment and Climate Change has identified the gardens as part of the recovery plan for certain environments and species, including Cooks River clay plain scrub forest, Acacia pubescens (downy wattle) and Wahlenbergia multicaulis (Tadgell's bluebell).

Other plant species in the garden include pine, cherry blossom and azalea, which are present in the Japanese Garden. Species such as frangipani, lavender and sage are found in the Scented Garden. Floribunda, grandiflora, petunias, garden roses and David Austin Roses are present in the Rose Gardens. The Garden's woodland area has a thick canopy of foliage with tremendous amount of vegetation that would produce damp littered leaves and a moldy floor. A remnant of Cumberland Plain Woodland, the woodland's structural form is an open-forest to low woodland with a shrub by understory.

=== Fauna ===
Opened in 1994, the Fauna Reserve contains wallabies, kangaroos, emus, rufous bettong, red-bellied black snakes and the common wombat. The Reserve is a built structure which allows the public to walk through and view native animals within their own environment. The aviary was officially opened on 5 December 1988 and it contains Australian and Asian bird species. Migrating birds also frequently visit the Botanic Gardens. Outside of the fauna reserve, animals such as peacocks, swans and other native birds wander around the garden freely.

== Attractions ==
- Japanese garden and Japanese rock garden
- Fauna reserve
- Rose garden
- Scented garden
- Australian native and rainforest gardens

== Gallery ==
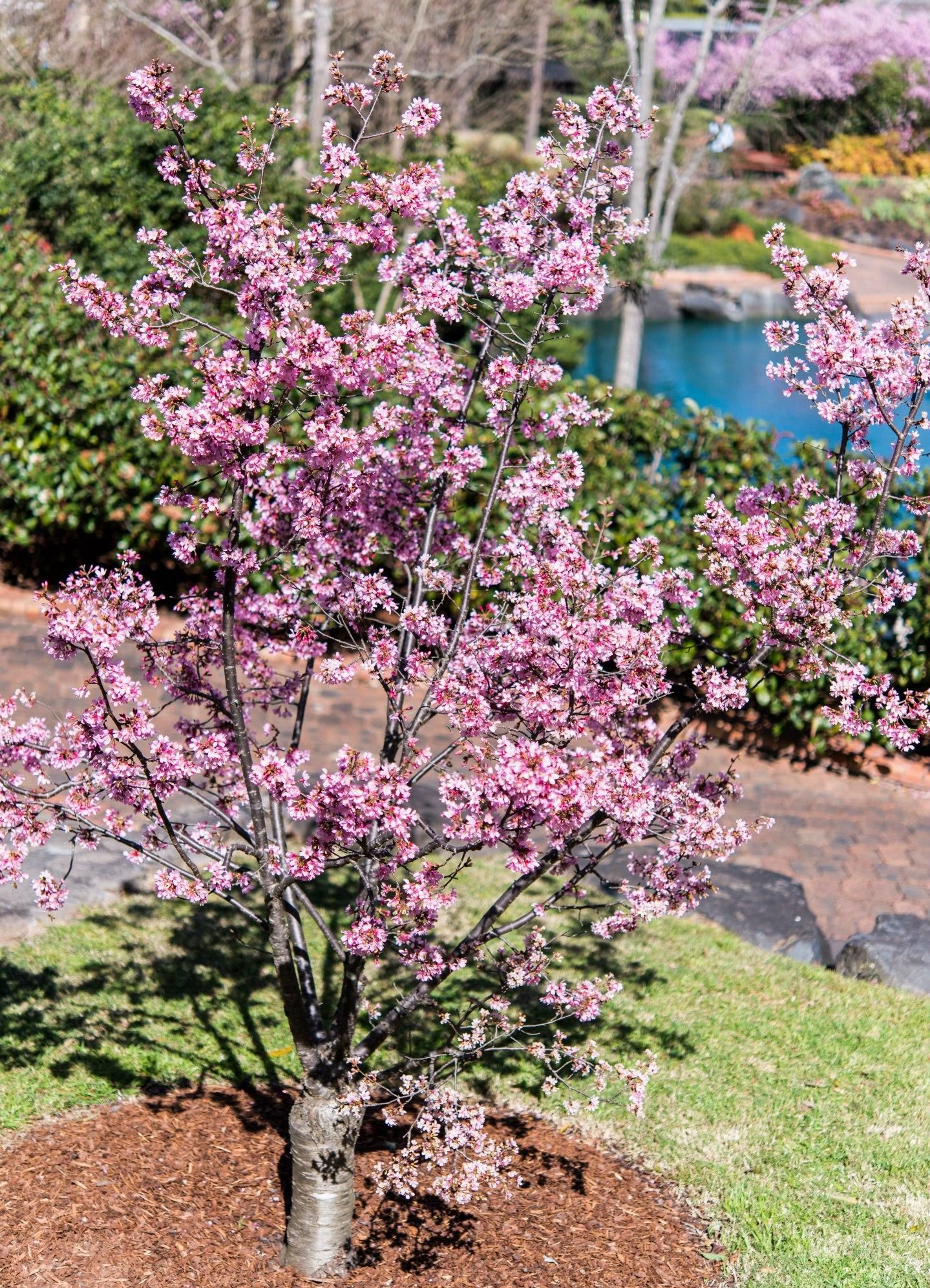
An ornamental cherry blossom tree

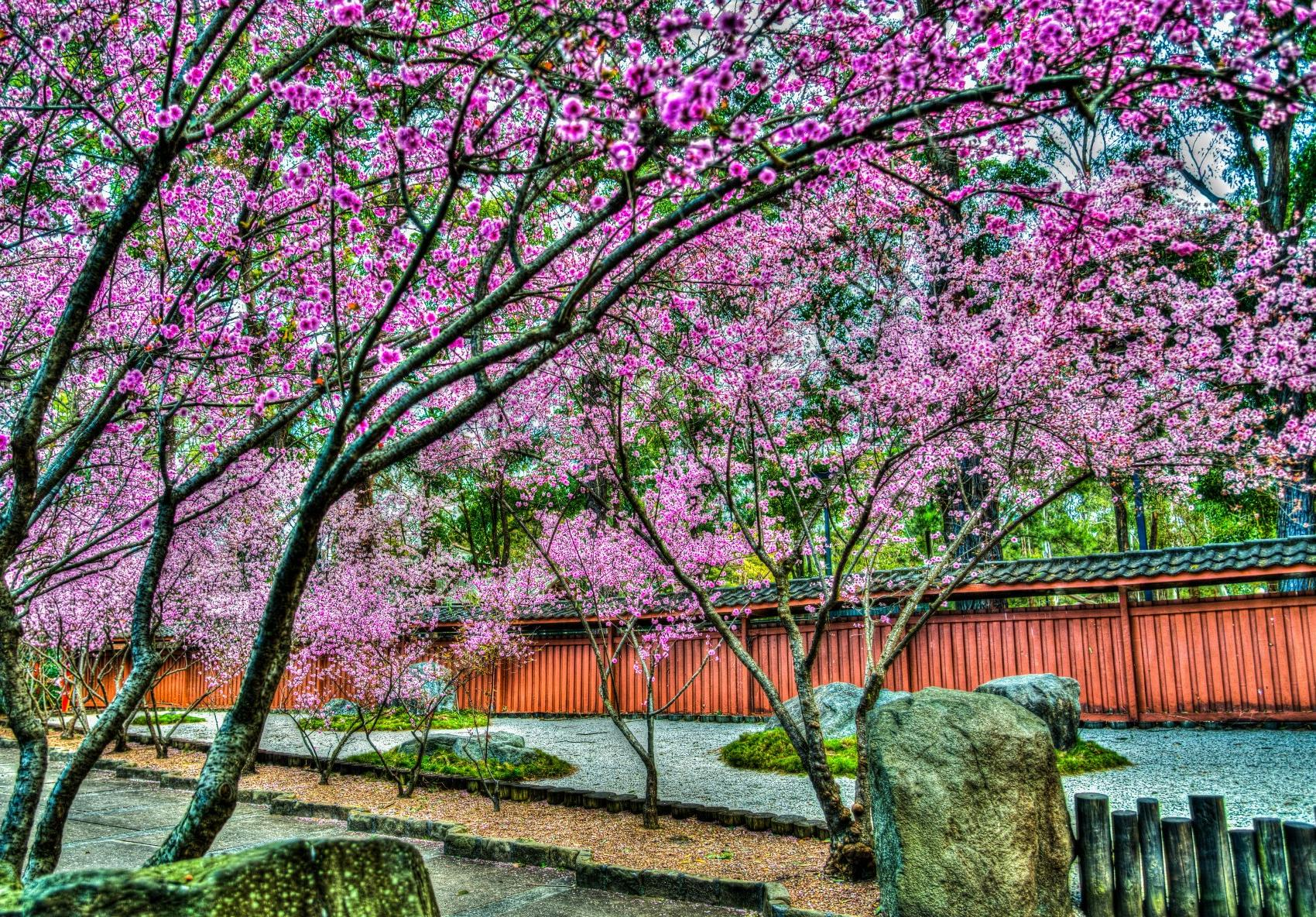
Blossoming cherry blossom trees in the Japanese Garden

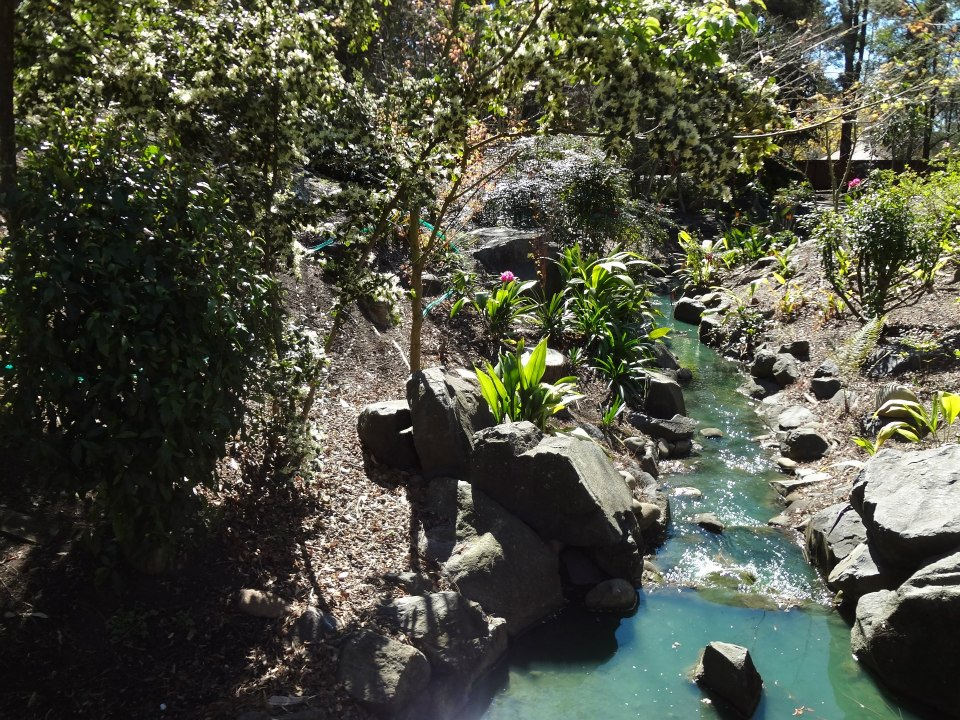
A small stream

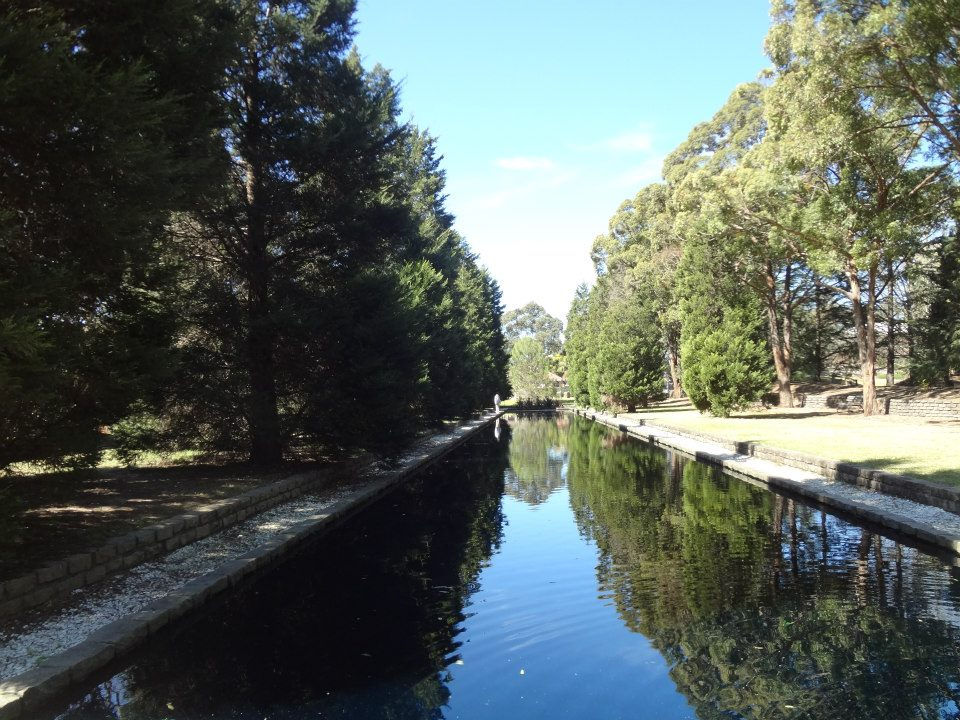
Reflection Pool

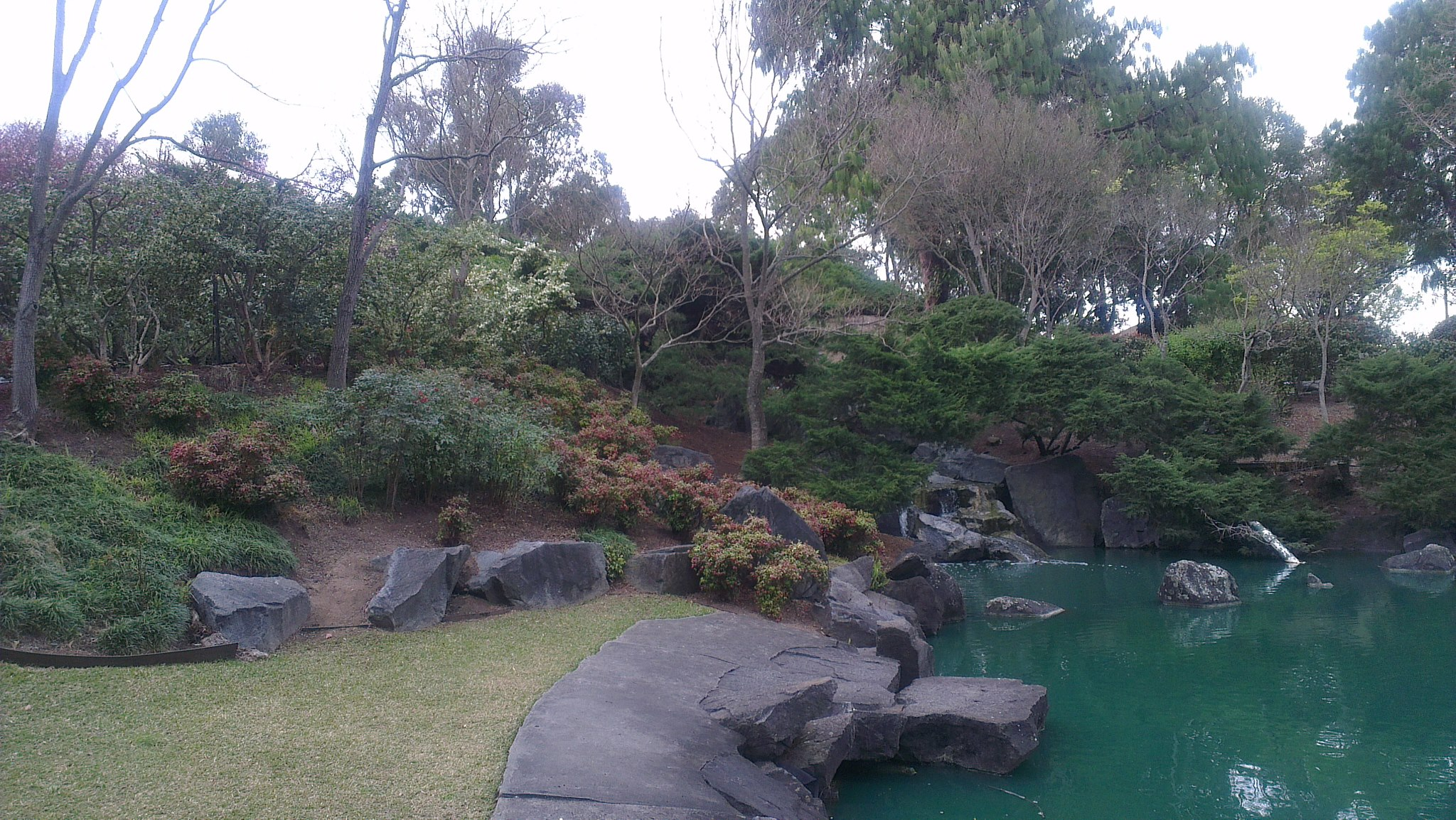
The Garden Lake

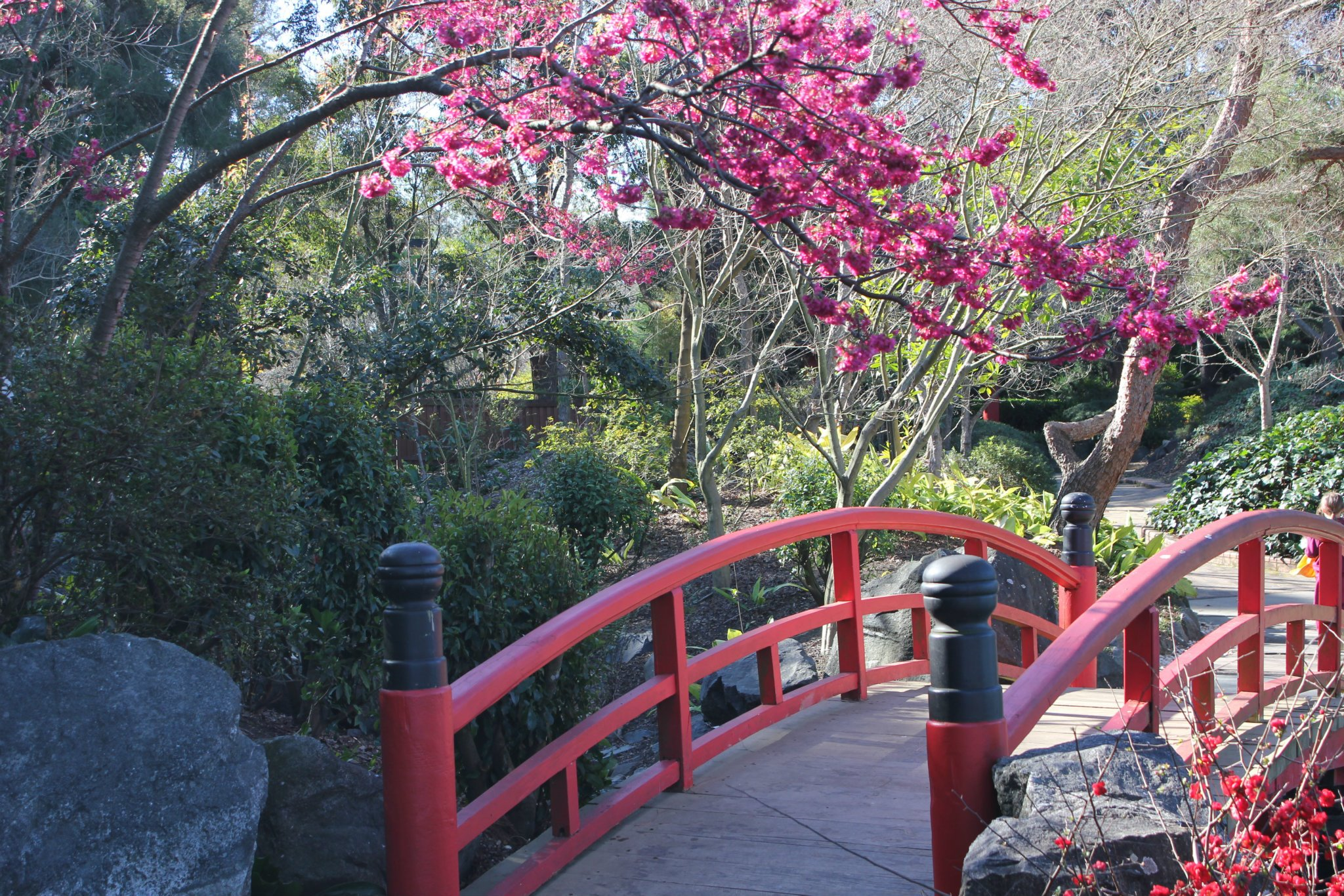
Torri bridge

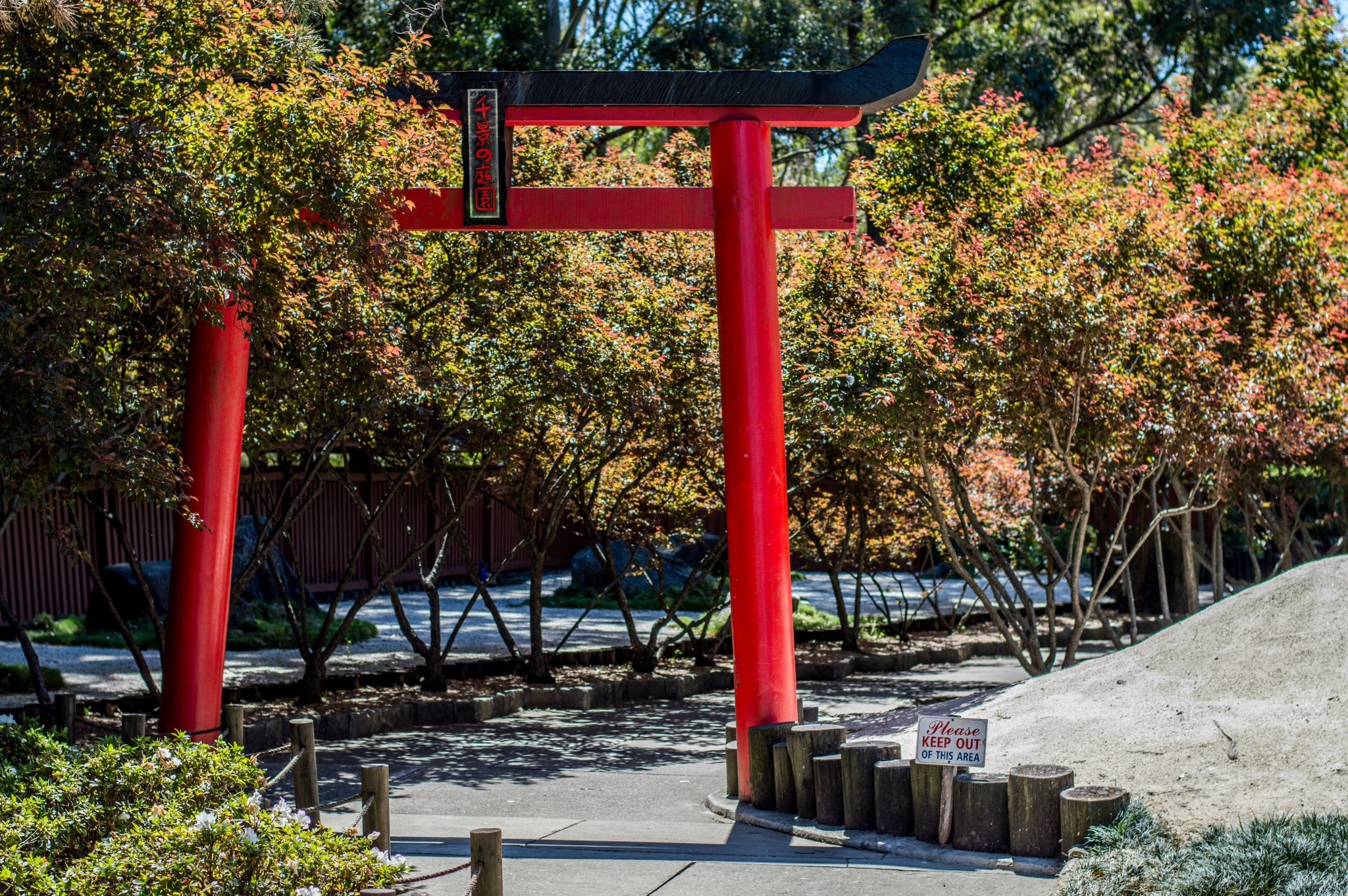
Zen Gardens, which features a Ryoan-ji style garden

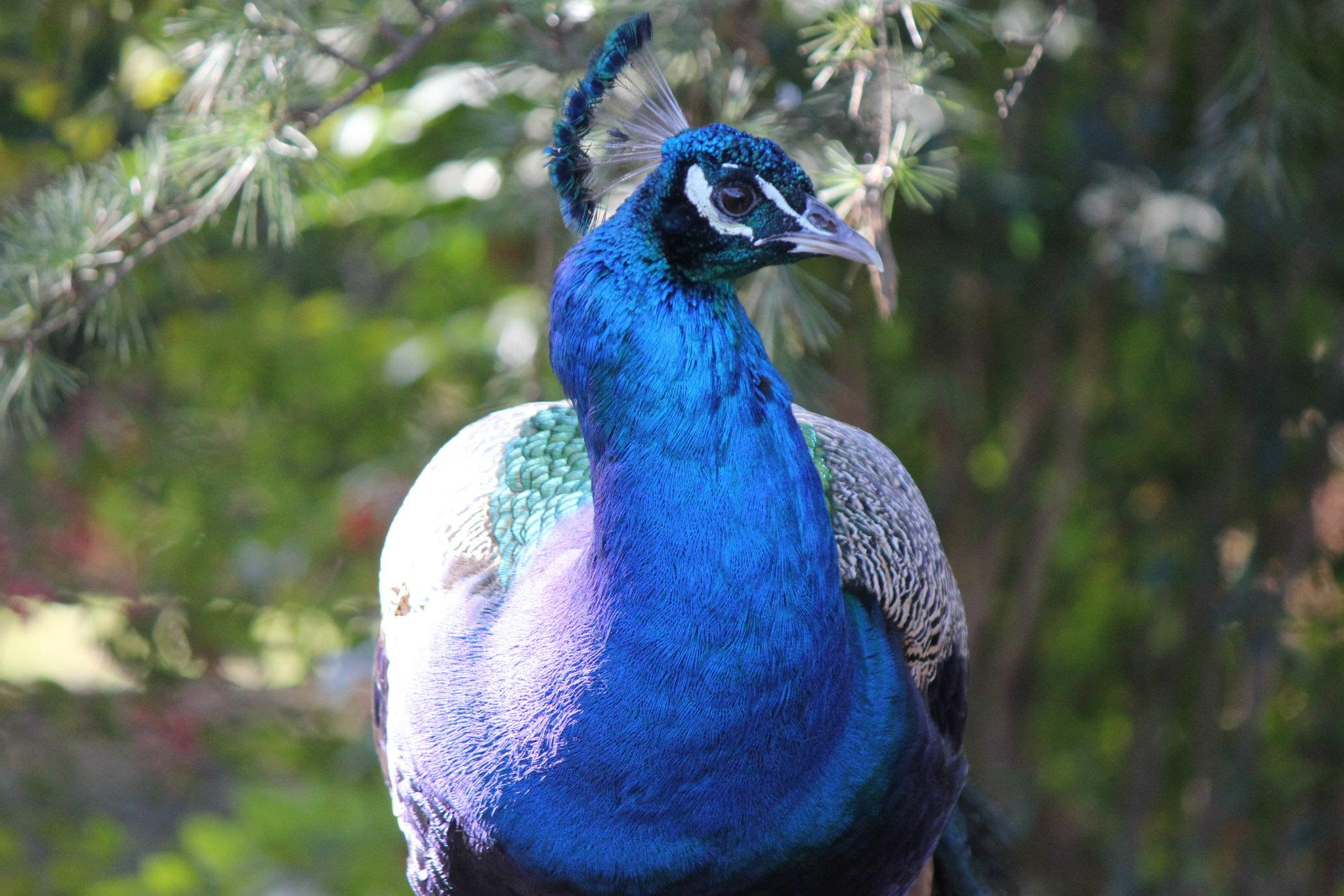
Peacock

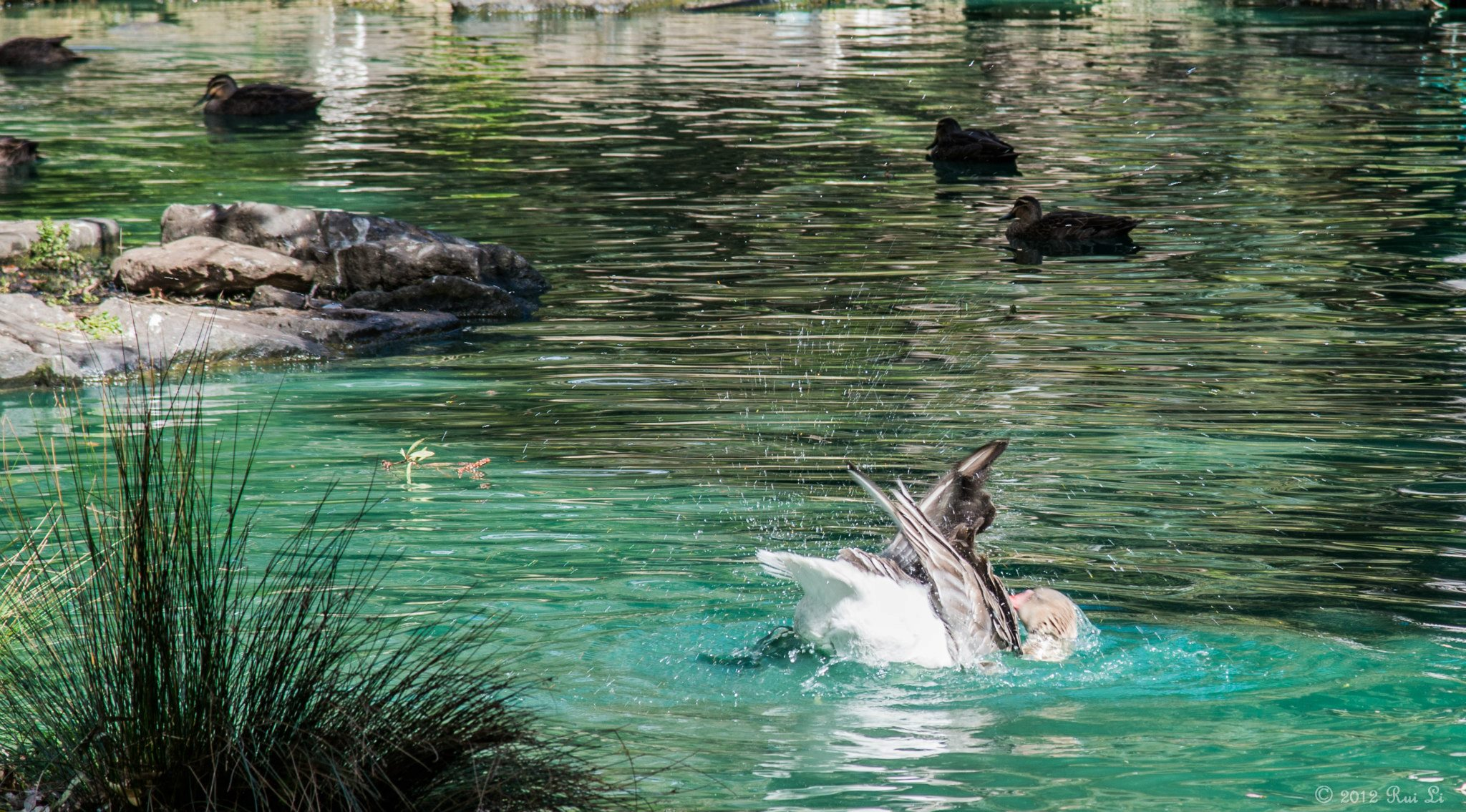
A goose on the lake

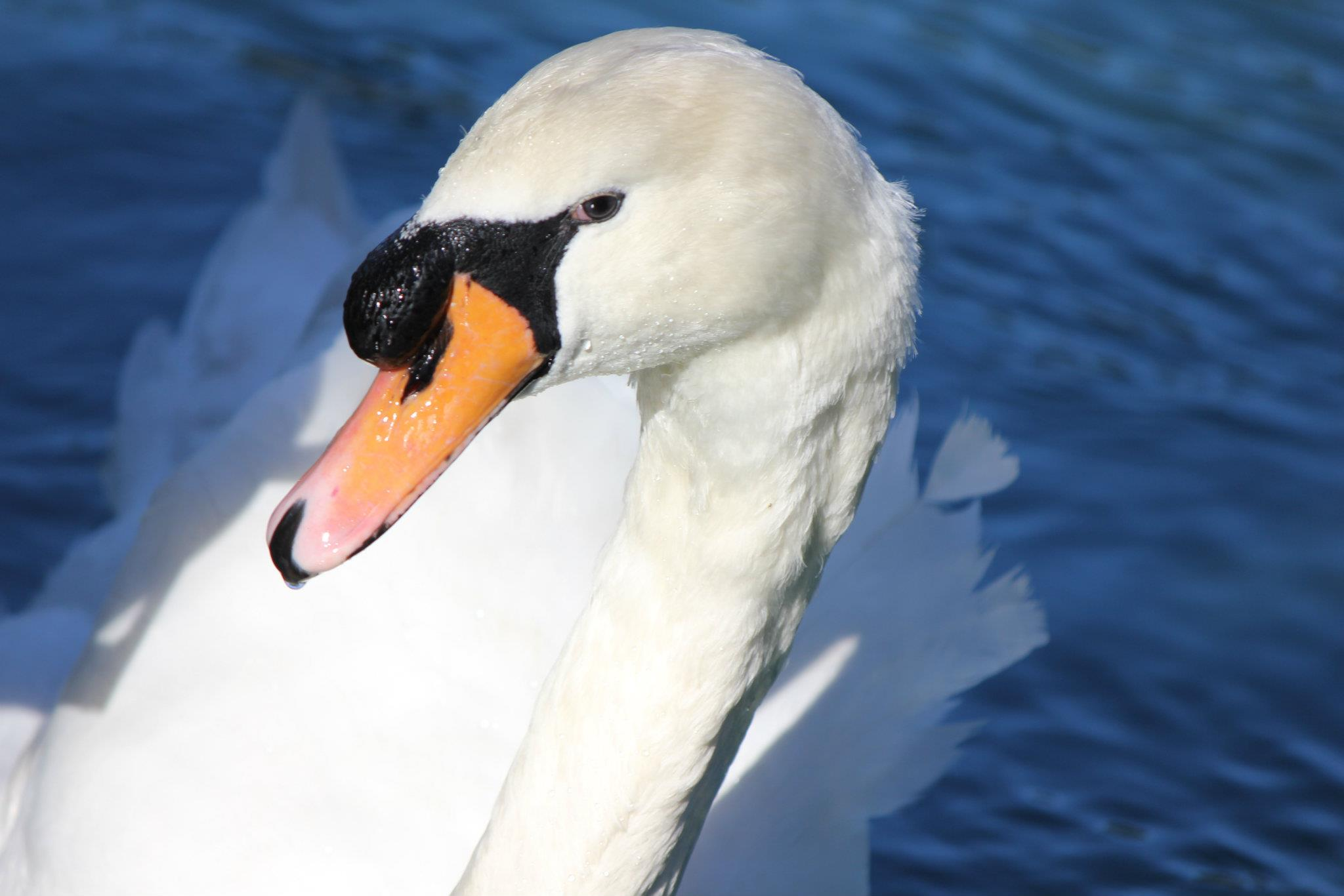
Mute swan

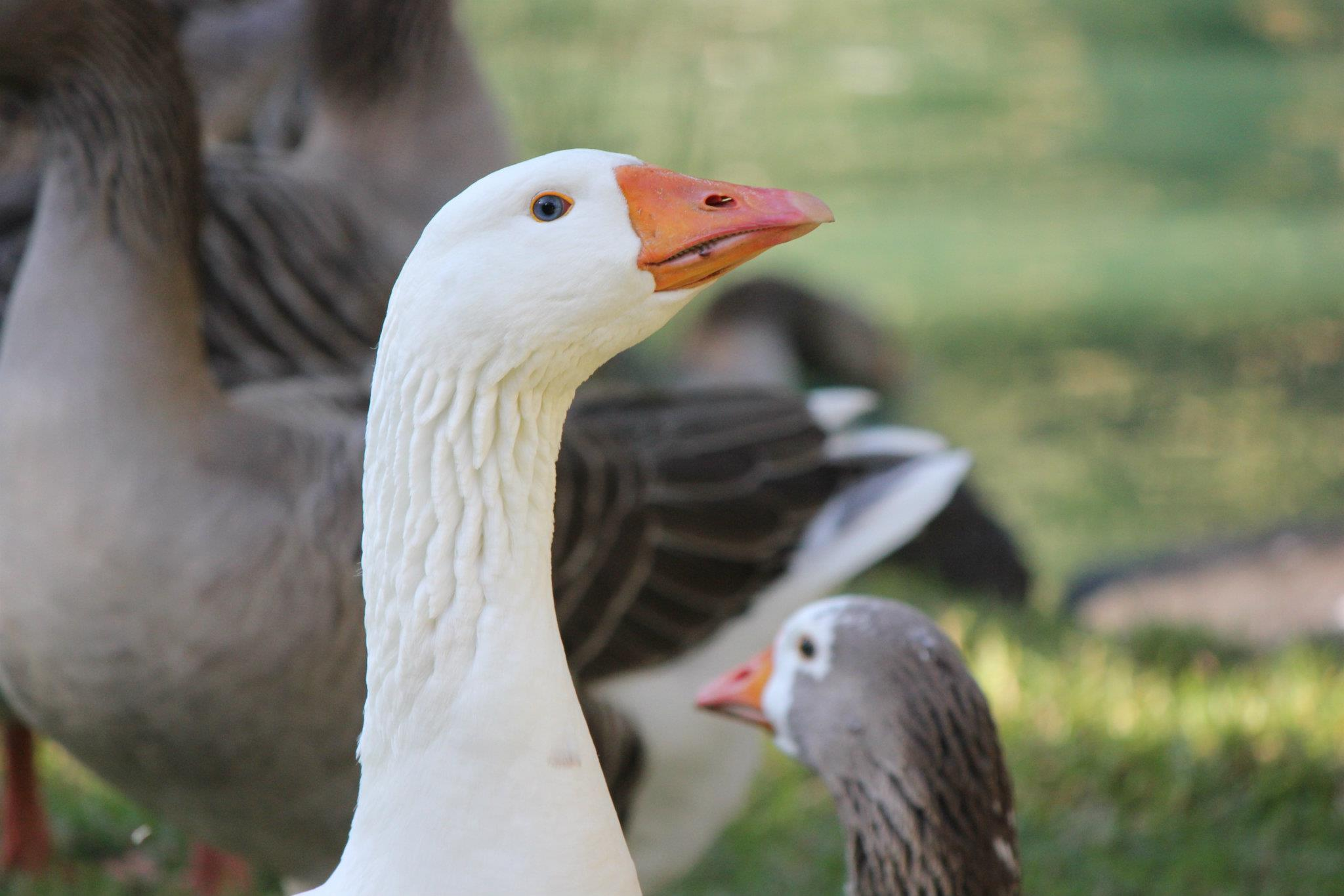
Domestic goose

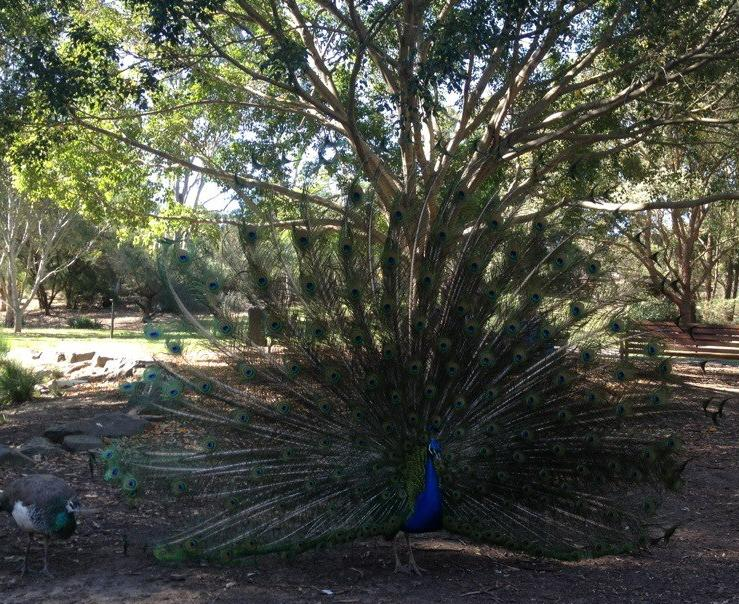
Peacock with open feathers

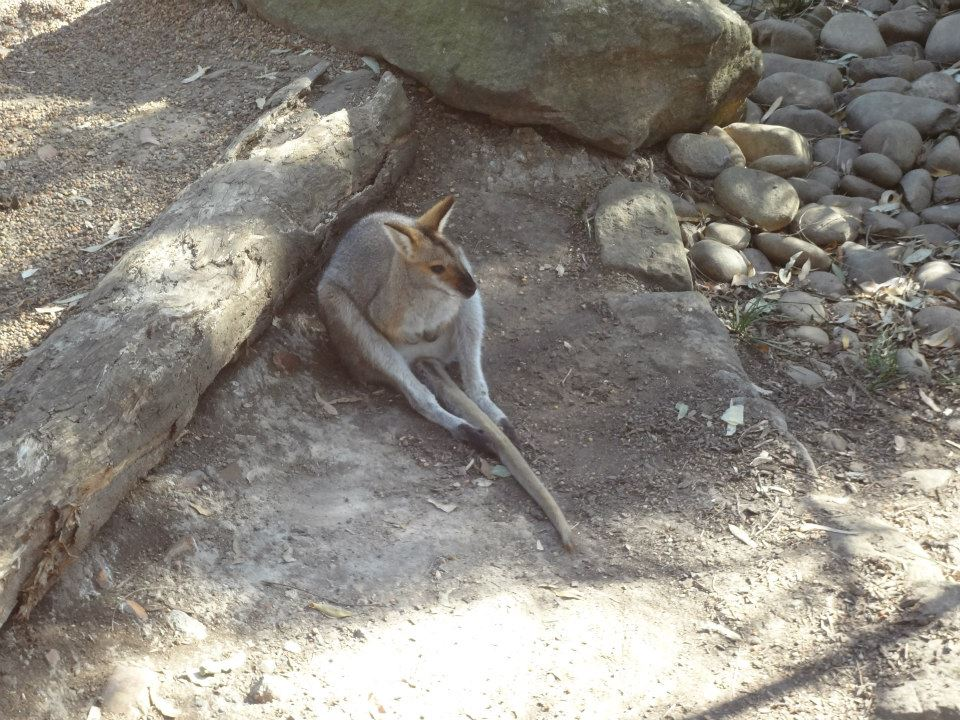
Red-necked wallaby

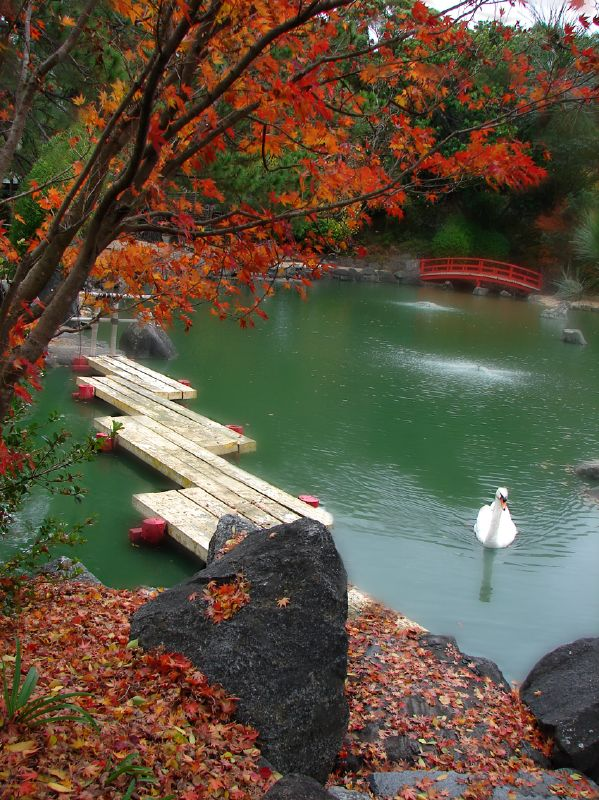
Swan at Autumn Lake

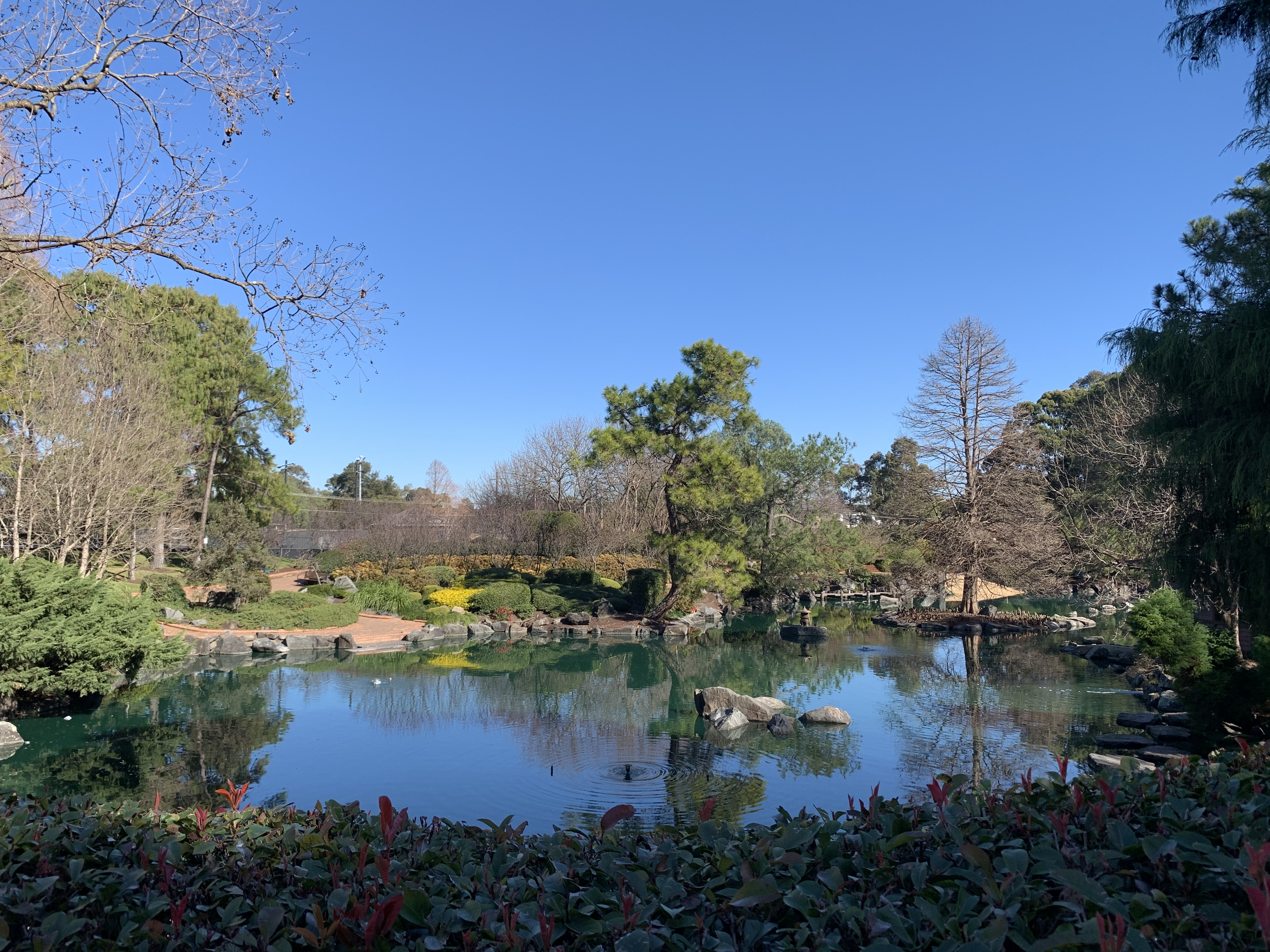
View of lake

== See also ==
- List of parks in Sydney
- Royal Botanic Gardens
- Nurragingy Reserve
- Central Gardens Nature Reserve
- Garden tourism
