= Blacktown =

Suburb in western Sydney, Australia

- Suburb
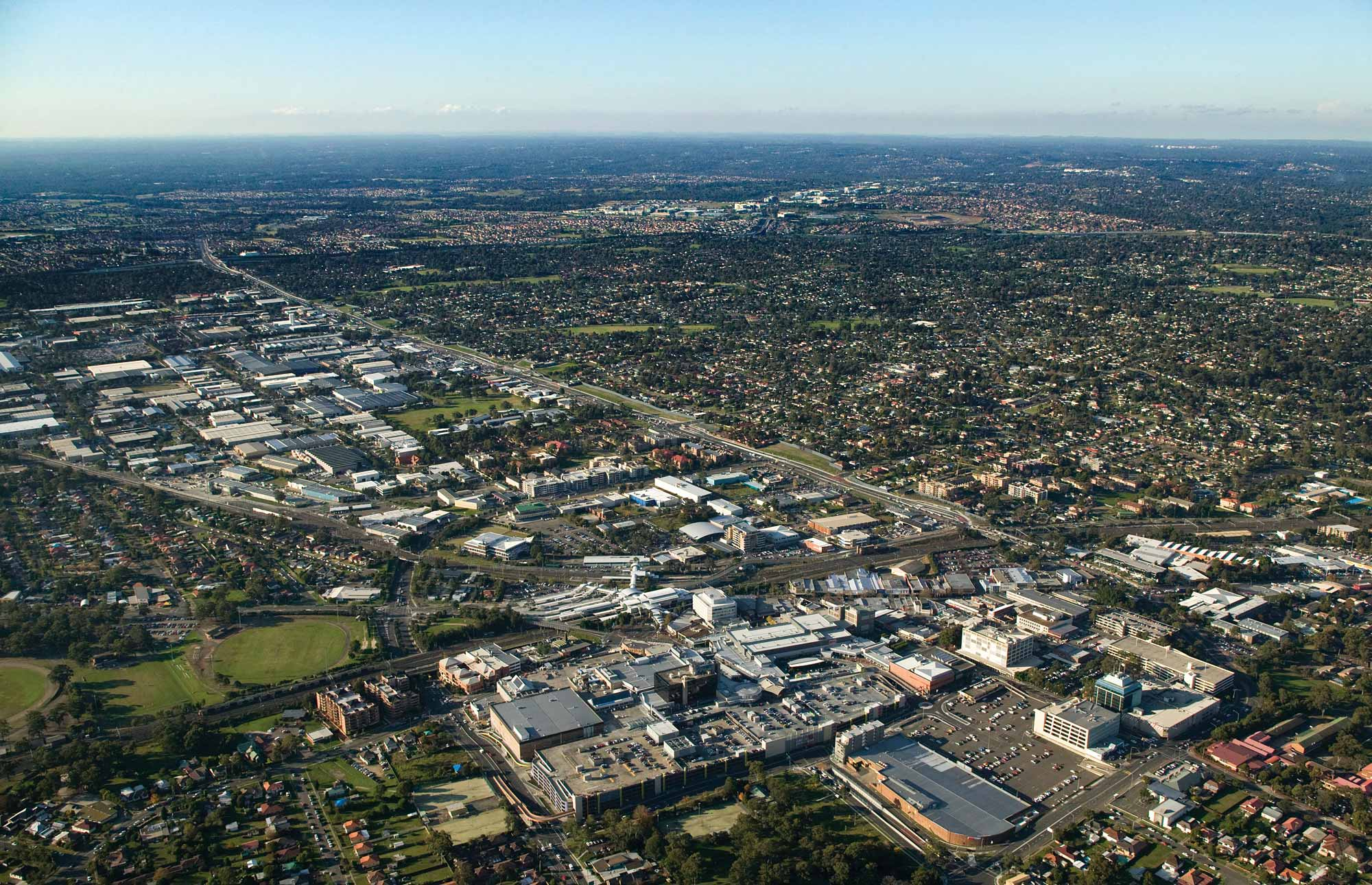
- Aerial view of Blacktown

- Interactive map of Blacktown
- Country: Australia
- State: New South Wales
- City: Sydney
- LGA: City of Blacktown
- Location: 34 km (21 mi) west of Sydney CBD
- Established: 1821

Government
  - State electorates: Blacktown; Prospect; Winston Hills
  - Federal divisions: Chifley; Greenway; McMahon
- Elevation: 70 m (230 ft)

Population
  - Total: 50,961 (2021 census)
- Postcode: 2148
Suburbs around Blacktown
Marayong	Kings Park	Kings Langley
Woodcroft; Doonside	Blacktown	Lalor Park
Arndell Park; Huntingwood	Prospect	Seven Hills

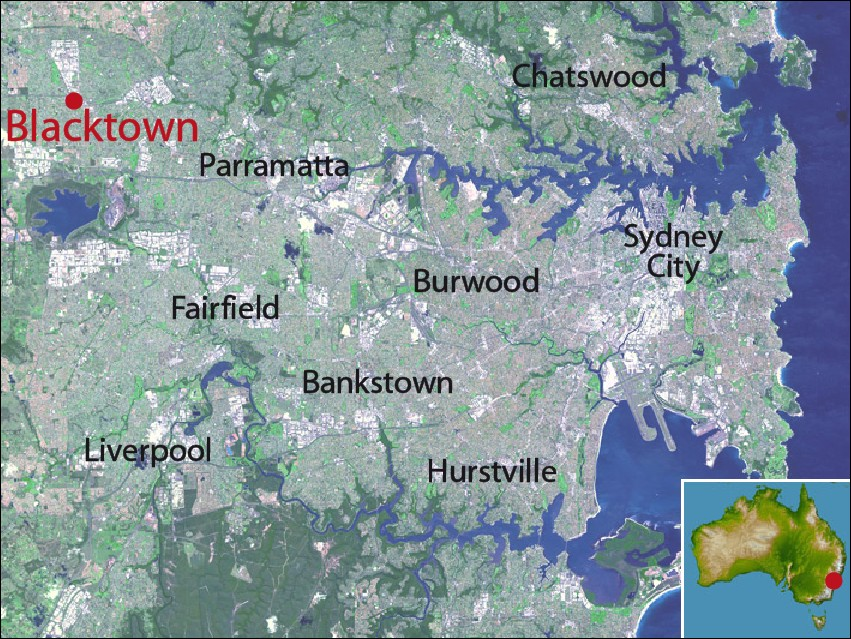
Location map of Blacktown based on NASA satellite images

Blacktown is a suburb and a commercial hub of Western Sydney in New South Wales, Australia. It is located 34 km (21 mi) west of the Sydney CBD. Blacktown is one of the most multicultural places within Greater Sydney.

== History ==
Before the arrival of the First Fleet in 1788, the area of today's Blacktown was inhabited by different groups of the Darug people including the Warmuli, based around what is now Prospect, and their neighbours the Gomerigal from the South Creek area and the Wawarawarry from the Eastern Creek area. It is estimated that fifty to ninety percent of the Darug died of smallpox and other introduced diseases within a few years of the British arrival. Governor Arthur Phillip began granting land in the area to white settlers in 1791. In 1819 Governor Lachlan Macquarie granted land to two Indigenous men, Colebee and Nurragingy as payment for their service to The Crown, for assisting Cox with the road over the Blue Mountains and in dealing with Aboriginal issues.

In 1823, the Native Institution (a school for Aboriginal children) was moved from Parramatta to the site where Richmond Road meets Rooty Hill Road North (this intersection is now in the suburbs of Oakhurst and Glendenning) which was named "The BlackTown". The institution was then known as Black Town Native Institute and its role in the removal of Aboriginal children from their families and their isolation from their heritage and culture was an early part of the history of the stolen generation. Although the institution closed in 1833, the road heading out to the Institute became known as the Black Town Road. In 1860 the Railway Department gave the name of Black Town Road Station to the railway station at the junction of the railway and the Black Town Road, with the name shortening to Blacktown by 1862.

The arrival of the railway led to the formation of a town around the station. A post office was opened in 1862 and a school in 1877. In 1906, the Shire of Blacktown was formed and in 1930, electricity was introduced to the town. The population in 1933 was then around 13,000. In the 1950s and 1960s, there was a large amount of suburban development both in the current suburb of Blacktown and the new suburbs that sprung up around it. This led to civic development in the town centre with the world's first Westfield opening in 1959, the hospital opening in 1965, the courthouse and police station in 1966, the library in 1967 and the TAFE college in 1969. In 1973, the Westpoint shopping centre opened which was soon followed by the cinema complex.

== Climate ==
Blacktown experiences a humid subtropical climate (Köppen: Cfa/Cfb, Trewartha: Cfbl/Cfal), with moderately hot, moderately rainy summers and cold, moderately dry winters, and experiences precipitation year-round. Like Greater Western Sydney, Blacktown has a greater annual temperature range between winter and summer, and receives less precipitation than on Sydney Observatory Park.

Summers are moderately hot and humid, having a similar average temperature to Port Jackson, but diurnal temperature range is higher from the lack of coastal sea breezes from the Tasman Sea, which only make up to the suburb of Homebush, which is east of Blacktown, which also reduces summer precipitation . In addition, 29.6 days will exceed 30 °C (86 °F), which is more than twice as common compared to Observatory Park, which only records 11.1 days exceeding the same threshold. Extremes range from 41.7 °C (107.1 °F) on 30 December 1965 to 8.3 °C (46.9 °F) on 2 February 1965.

Winters are cool to cold and moderately dry. Due to its inland position further from the Tasman Sea, it typically records 11.0 nights below 5 °C (41 °F) and 2.3 nights below 0 °C (32 °F), which is cold compared to the Sydney CBD, which on an average year, records zero nights below 5 °C (41 °F), allowing light frosts on many winter mornings. Southwesterly winds, known as frontal lows often affect Blacktown in the winter, but lose much of their moisture over the Victorian Alps and Great Dividing Range, making this the driest season in Blacktown. Extremes range from 27.8 °C (82.0 °F) on 25 August 1972 to −3.9 °C (25.0 °F) on 16 July 1970.

Climate data for Blacktown, New South Wales, Australia (1955–1975 normals, extremes 1965–1975)
Month	Jan	Feb	Mar	Apr	May	Jun	Jul	Aug	Sep	Oct	Nov	Dec	Year
Record high °C (°F)	41.4 (106.5)	41.1 (106.0)	40.0 (104.0)	33.6 (92.5)	28.3 (82.9)	24.0 (75.2)	25.8 (78.4)	27.8 (82.0)	35.0 (95.0)	36.6 (97.9)	39.0 (102.2)	41.7 (107.1)	41.7 (107.1)
Mean daily maximum °C (°F)	28.3 (82.9)	27.7 (81.9)	27.0 (80.6)	24.1 (75.4)	20.0 (68.0)	17.5 (63.5)	17.4 (63.3)	18.6 (65.5)	21.4 (70.5)	23.8 (74.8)	26.3 (79.3)	28.4 (83.1)	23.4 (74.1)
Mean daily minimum °C (°F)	16.7 (62.1)	17.0 (62.6)	15.7 (60.3)	12.3 (54.1)	8.3 (46.9)	6.3 (43.3)	4.5 (40.1)	5.9 (42.6)	7.9 (46.2)	11.0 (51.8)	12.9 (55.2)	15.3 (59.5)	11.2 (52.1)
Record low °C (°F)	8.9 (48.0)	8.3 (46.9)	5.3 (41.5)	4.4 (39.9)	0.8 (33.4)	−1.1 (30.0)	−3.9 (25.0)	−0.8 (30.6)	0.3 (32.5)	3.3 (37.9)	6.1 (43.0)	8.5 (47.3)	−3.9 (25.0)
Average rainfall mm (inches)	102.6 (4.04)	117.9 (4.64)	117.7 (4.63)	73.1 (2.88)	65.4 (2.57)	79.9 (3.15)	43.2 (1.70)	54.4 (2.14)	46.6 (1.83)	70.2 (2.76)	81.5 (3.21)	73.0 (2.87)	925.5 (36.42)
Average rainy days (≥ 1 mm)	8.0	8.7	9.0	6.4	6.0	6.9	5.1	5.4	5.7	7.4	7.7	7.6	83.9
Source: Australian Bureau of Meteorology

== Commercial area ==
The Blacktown Commercial Business District is located close to Blacktown railway station. Westpoint Blacktown is a major shopping centre and there are a number of small shops, restaurants and hotels in the surrounding area. Westpoint also houses a western suburb television studio of the Nine Network. The Blacktown CBD features the following landmarks:

- An Australian Catholic University campus
- Blacktown City Council corporate head office
- Blacktown Courthouse
- Blacktown Hospital
- Blacktown Workers Club
- Cucina Locale Revolving Restaurant
- Max Webber Library – Blacktown City Council's central library
- Patrician Brothers' College Blacktown
- Nagle College Blacktown

A notable Blacktown retailer in the 1950s was Frank Lowy who conducted a delicatessen and small goods shop in Main Street.

== Transport ==
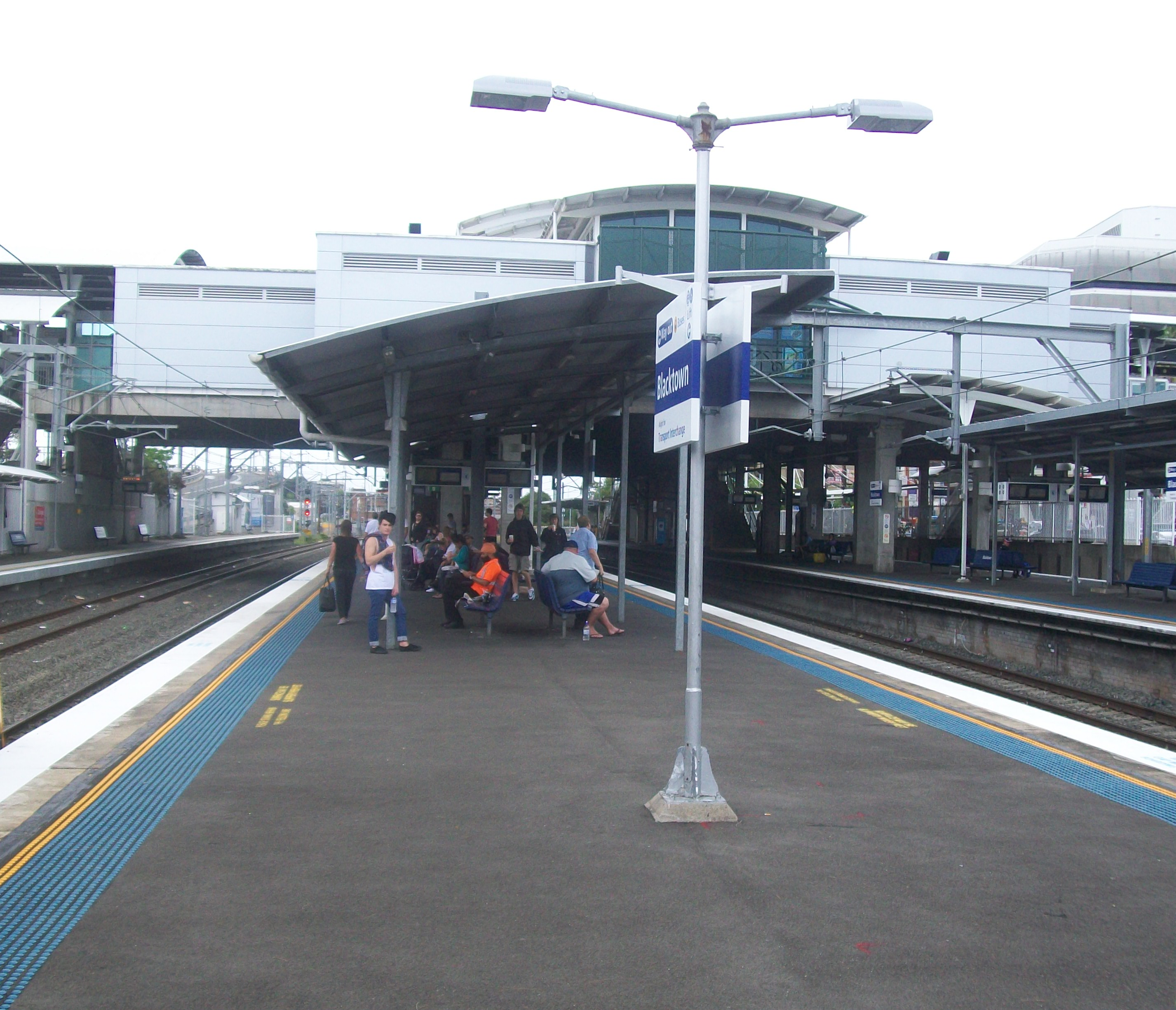
Blacktown Rail Station

According to the 2021 census, the most common way of getting to work from Blacktown was by car (48.3%) with public transport used by 7.9%. Most public transport was done by train (3.3%) with 1.7% catching buses for all or part of their journey. Blacktown railway station is on the North Shore & Western Line and the Cumberland Line of the Sydney Trains network. A major bus interchange is located next to the station and an underground bus station is at the entrance to Westpoint. Blacktown is a terminus of the North-West T-way.

Busways provides services to Northern areas (Rouse Hill, Castle Hill, Kellyville, Glenwood and Stanhope Gardens), West areas (Mount Druitt, Plumpton, Oakhurst, Quakers Hill, Dean Park, Woodcroft) and South districts (Prospect, Arndell Park, Huntingwood, Tallawong, Doonside, Blacktown Hospital), whilst CDC NSW provides Eastern services (Macquarie Park, Seven Hills, Parramatta, Kings Langley).

== Schools ==
The first school, a single-storey brick building with gables, was opened in 1877. While no longer in use as a school, the building in Flushcombe Road is now used as a Visitor Information Centre. It is the oldest remaining building in the Blacktown CBD and is heritage-listed.

Government-run primary schools in the area include: Blacktown North Public School, Blacktown South Public School, Blacktown West Public School, Lynwood Park Public School, Marayong South Public School, Shelley Public School, and Walters Road Public School. Public high schools include: Blacktown Boys High School, Blacktown Girls High School, Evans High School and Mitchell High School. There is also the Coreen School, which caters to older children with learning difficulties.

There are two Catholic primary schools, St Michael's and St Patrick's, and two Catholic high schools, Nagle College for girls and Patrician Brothers' College Blacktown for boys. Tyndale Christian School is a private school accepting children from kindergarten to year 12.

== Blacktown Arts Centre ==
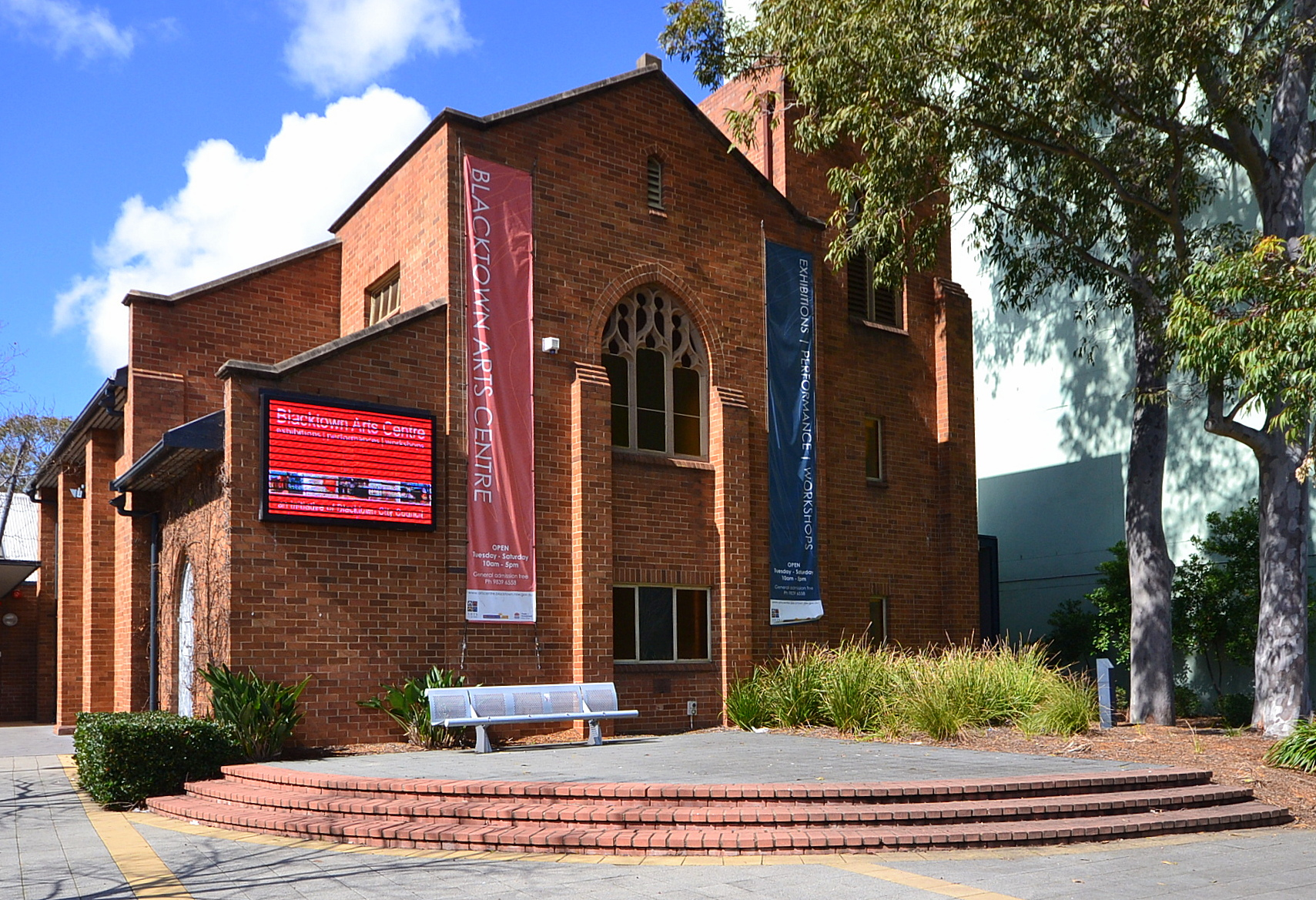
Blacktown Arts Centre

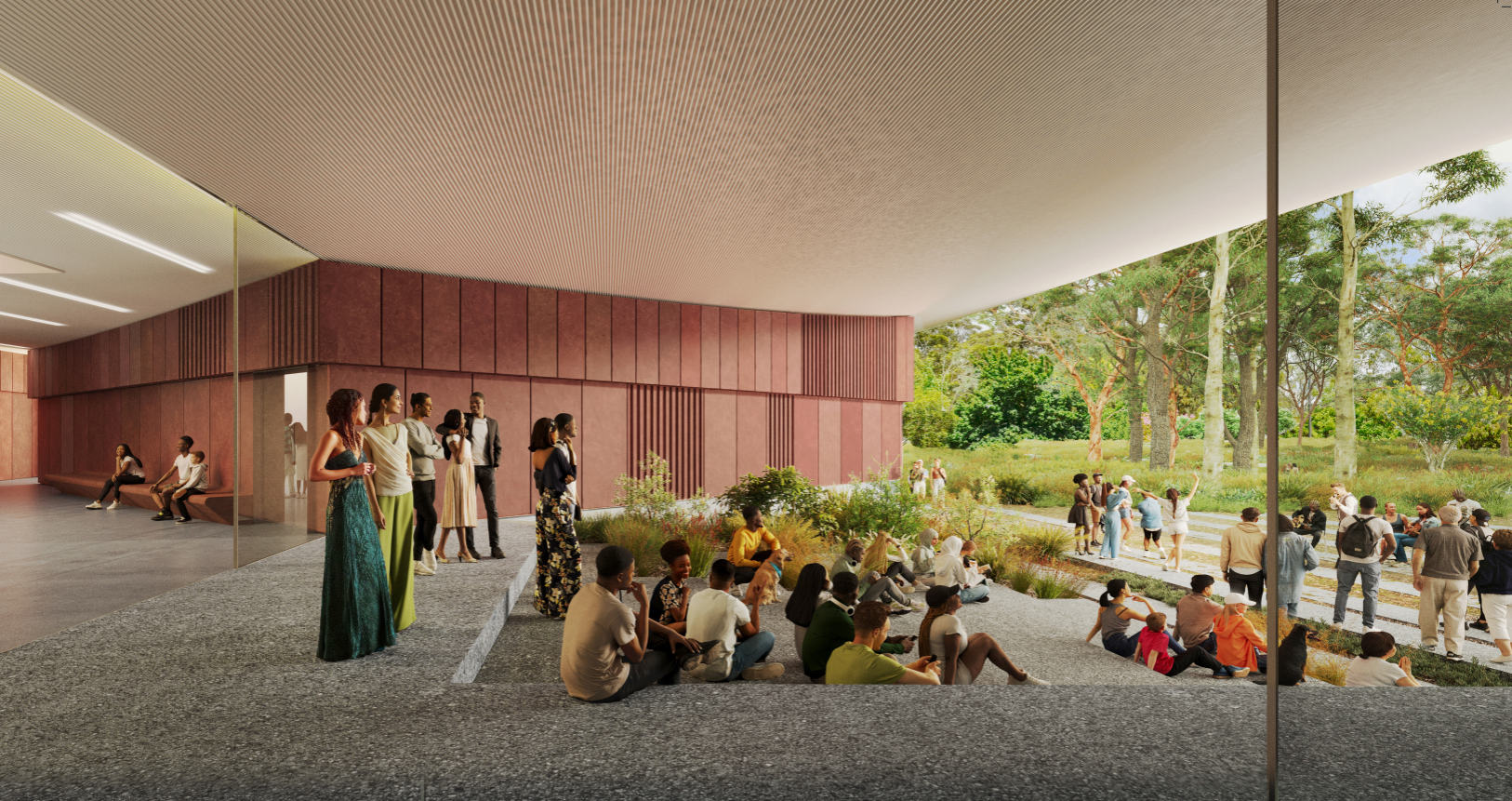
The render of the New Arts Centre

Blacktown Arts Centre is located at 78 Flushcombe Road on the highest point of land in the Blacktown CBD.

Originally built in the 1950s as an Anglican church, the building was deconsecrated in 1999. Originally acquired by Blacktown Council as a site for a car park, the Council in partnership with Arts NSW subsequently refurbished the building as a multi-arts centre.

The centre opened to the public in October 2002. In 2006 the centre underwent a multimillion-dollar refit and extension. The building reopened in April 2007 with facilities for performance, extended visual art galleries, workshop space and enhanced administrative areas.

The centre was closed to the public in January 2026,

== Sport and recreation ==
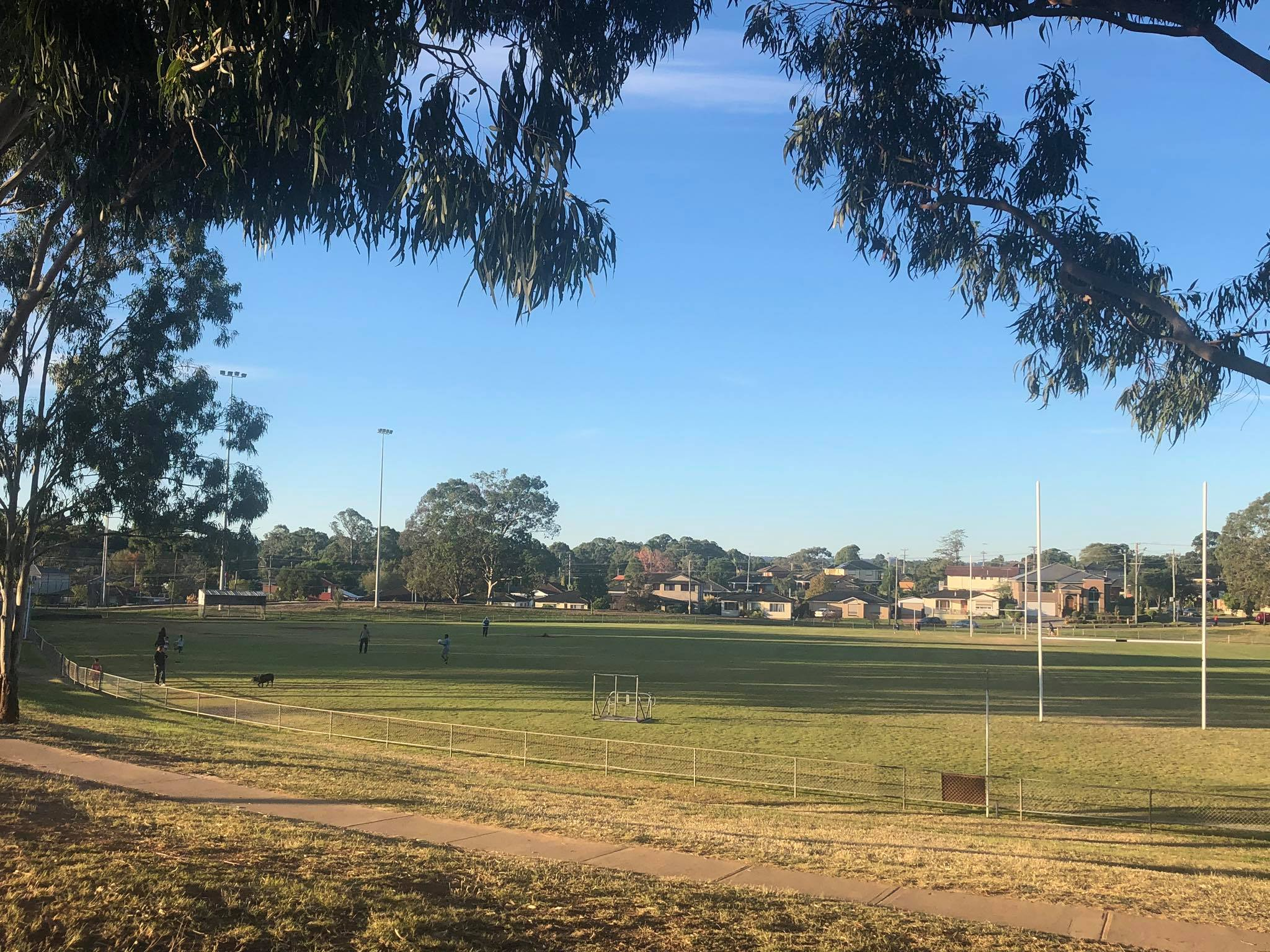
- Grantham Reserve
  Blacktown Stadium part of Blacktown Olympic park – capacity 10,000
- Fairfax Community Stadium (Used by NSWPL team Blacktown City Demons) – 7,500 capacity (1,200 seated)
- Blacktown Baseball Stadium (Baseball) 5,000 capacity (1,200 seated)
- Blacktown Softball Stadium (Softball) 5,000 capacity (1,100 seated)
- Blacktown Showground (festivals and cultural events/activities)
- Village Green & Civic Centre (Community events. Known as "Blacktown's Dancers Lane")
- PCYC Blacktown
- Blacktown Aquatic Center
- Blacktown Norwegian Ice Bathing Club
- Bungarribee Park
- Featherdale Wildlife Park
- Alpha Park
- Blacktown Olympic Park
- Grantham Reserve
- Captain Tench Reserve
- H.E Laybutt Sporting Complex

== Media ==
Blacktown is served by local newspaper Blacktown Advocate and community radio station SWR Triple 9.

== Population ==
=== Demographics ===
According to the 2021 census, there were 50,961 residents in the suburb of Blacktown. 43.6% of people were born in Australia. The most common countries of birth were India 16.6%, Philippines 5.5%, China 2.4%, Fiji 1.9% and New Zealand 1.8%. 39.3% of people only spoke English at home. Other languages spoken at home included Punjabi 10.2%, Hindi 4.4%, Arabic 4.1%, Tagalog 3.1% and Gujarati 2.8%. The most common responses for religion in Blacktown were Catholic 21.7%, No Religion 16.8%, Hinduism 14.5%, Sikhism 8.7% and Islam 7.5%. In 2021, the median age of the population in Blacktown was 34.

== Notable people ==
- Josh Addo-Carr, rugby league footballer for the Canterbury-Bankstown Bulldogs
- Deng Adut, lawyer and refugee
- Blake Austin, rugby league footballer
- Kurtley Beale, rugby union player for the Wasps RFC and Australia
- Chris Brien, drummer, percussionist, and drum clinician, member of Swoop
- Bob Brown, a former Greens Senator was raised here
- Reagan Campbell-Gillard, rugby league footballer for the Penrith Panthers was born here
- Charles Casuscelli, former member for Strathfield in the New South Wales parliament was raised here
- Anita Cobby, murder victim, lived with her parents in Blacktown at the time of her death
- Darren Coleman, rugby union coach
- Toni Collette, actress
- Ben Creagh, rugby league, player for the St. George Illawarra Dragons
- Damian Cudlin, a professional motorcycle racer, was born here
- Brett Delaney, rugby league footballer was born and raised here
- Jake Doran, cricketer
- Joel Edgerton, actor
- Andrew Fifita, rugby league footballer for the Wests Tigers and Cronulla-Sutherland Sharks
- David Fifita, rugby league footballer
- Danny Galea, rugby league footballer, lived and went to school here
- Mark Geyer, rugby league footballer for the Penrith Panthers
- Matt Geyer, rugby league footballer for the Melbourne Storm
- Wade Graham, rugby league footballer for the Cronulla Sharks was born here
- Timothy Hodge, Paralympic swimmer
- Calum Hood, bassist of 5 Seconds of Summer
- Hush, Glam Rock band formed in 1971 in Seven Hills
- Brad Izzard, rugby league footballer
- George Jennings, rugby league footballer
- Michael Jennings, rugby league footballer for the Parramatta Eels
- Robert Jennings, rugby league footballer
- Julian Karikalan, filmmaker
- Felix Lee, member of South Korean boy group Stray Kids
- Frank Lowy, Czech-born, Australia's leading philanthropist began his new life in Australia in Blacktown
- Feleti Mateo, rugby league footballer was born and raised here
- Taylan May, rugby league footballer
- Tyrone May, rugby league footballer
- Daniel Mookhey, 67th Treasurer of New South Wales
- Matt Moylan, rugby league footballer
- Courtney Nevin, soccer player for the Australia national team
- Northlane, a metalcore band formed in 2009
- Marlisa Punzalan, winner of the sixth season of The X Factor Australia
- The Radiators, pub rock pop band formed in 1978
- Tommy Raudonikis, rugby league footballer for the Western Suburbs Magpies
- Jarrod Sammut, rugby league footballer
- Gurinder Sandhu, Australian cricketer
- Colin Sieders, Australian paracanoeist and former racing driver
- Kyah Simon, soccer player for the Melbourne City FC and Australia
- Will Skelton, rugby union player for the NSW Waratahs and Australia
- Thy Art Is Murder, a deathcore band formed in 2006
- Mark Winterbottom, V8 Supercar driver for Ford
- Matthew Wright, rugby league footballer was raised here
