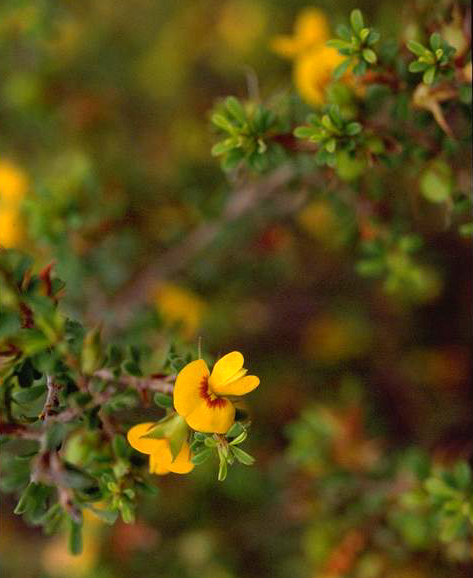
- At Badgerys Creek

Conservation status
- Vulnerable (EPBC Act)

Scientific classification
- Kingdom: Plantae
- Clade: Tracheophytes
- Clade: Angiosperms
- Clade: Eudicots
- Clade: Rosids
- Order: Fabales
- Family: Fabaceae
- Subfamily: Faboideae
- Genus: Pultenaea
- Species: P. parviflora

Binomial name
- Pultenaea parviflora Sieber ex DC.

Synonyms
- Pultenaea parviflora Sieber ex DC. var. parviflora

= Pultenaea parviflora =

Sydney bush-pea

Species of flowering plant

Pultenaea parviflora, commonly known as Sydney bush-pea, is a species of flowering plant in the family Fabaceae and is endemic to eastern New South Wales. It is usually a small, erect shrub with wedge-shaped to narrow egg-shaped leaves with the narrower end towards the base, and clusters of yellow to orange and red flowers.

== Description ==
Pultenaea parviflora is usually an erect shrub that typically grows to a height of up to 1.8 m (5 ft 11 in) and has soft hairs pressed against the stems. The leaves are arranged alternately, wedge-shaped to egg-shaped leaves with the narrower end towards the base, 2–6 mm (0.079–0.236 in) long and 1–1.5 mm (0.039–0.059 in) wide with stipules about 2 mm (0.079 in) long at the base. The edges of the leaves curve upwards and the tip is turned downwards. The flowers are arranged in clusters near the ends of branchlets, each flower 5–7 mm (0.20–0.28 in) long on pedicels 1.0–1.5 mm (0.039–0.059 in) long. The sepals are 4–5 mm (0.16–0.20 in) long with linear, papery bracteoles about 4 mm (0.16 in) long attached to the side of the sepal tube. The standard petal is yellow to orange with red markings, the wings yellow to orange and the keel yellow to red. Flowering occurs from August to November and the fruit is an egg-shaped pod about 5 mm (0.20 in) long.

== Taxonomy and naming ==
Pultenaea parviflora was first formally described in 1825 by Augustin Pyramus de Candolle in Prodromus Systematis Naturalis Regni Vegetabilis from an unpublished description by Franz Sieber. The specific epithet (parviflora) means "small-flowered".

== Distribution and habitat ==
Sydney bush-pea grows in heathy woodland on the Cumberland Plain, mostly between Windsor, Penrith and Dean Park, west of Sydney in eastern New South Wales.

== Conservation status ==
Pultenaea parviflora is classified as "vulnerable" under the Australian Government Environment Protection and Biodiversity Conservation Act 1999 and as "endangered" the New South Wales Government Biodiversity Conservation Act 2016. The main threats to the species include habitat loss, weed invasion, inappropriate fire regimes and illegal dumping of waste.

== Use in horticulture ==
Sydney bush-pea is only occasionally grown in gardens but forms a small, bushy shrub in a sunny position. It grows best in well-drained soil and tolerates moderate frost. Propagation is from scarified seed or from cuttings.
