= St John Paul II Catholic College =

Catholic school campus in Sydney, Australia

Location
- Nirimba Fields and Schofields, western Sydney, New South Wales; Australia; 33°42′20″S 150°53′30″E

Information
- Type: Independent co-educational secondary day school
- Motto: The Way Passes Through This Land
- Denomination: Roman Catholic
- Patron saint: John Paul II
- Established: 1996; 30 years ago (as Terra Sancta College)
- Founder: Quentin Evans
- Educational authority: New South Wales Department of Education
- Oversight: Catholic education in the Diocese of Parramatta, Diocese of Parramatta
- Principal: Robert Muscat
- Employees: ~124 (Full-time)
- Years: 7–12
- Enrolment: c. 1,054 (2023)
- Colours: Navy blue, red, white and green
- Website: www.stjohnpaul2.catholic.edu.au

The St John Paul II Catholic College is a dual schoolcampus independent Roman Catholic co-educational secondary day school, with campuses located in Nirimba Fields and Schofields, in the City of Blacktown in the western suburbs of Sydney, New South Wales, Australia.

== Overview ==
Founded in 1996 by Quentin Evans as Terra Sancta College, the college caters for students from Year 7 to Year 12 and is administered by the Catholic Education Office of the Diocese of Parramatta. It was founded as a result of the need identified by the local parish communities to establish a Catholic secondary school to serve the local parish communities and established Catholic primary schools of Mary Immaculate Quakers Hill, St Joseph's Schofields and St John's Riverstone.

The senior campus at Nirimba opened in 1998, allowing St John Paul II Catholic College to provide a continuous education for Years 7 to 12.

The school completed the vast majority of its building program in 2006 and now exists as a fully functional well resourced dual campus school. It offers a very broad education that reflects the academic, social, physical and spiritual needs and interests of students.

== Notable alumni ==
- Kyle Bruce, Australian Olympic weightlifter
- Eban Hyams, Indian-born Australian professional basketball player
- Mel McLaughlin, sports presenter
- Wade McKinnon, former NRL player

== Campus Features ==
As a dual-campus layout, the school has a Campus dedicated for Years 7–10 located in Schofields, with an additional senior (Years 11-12) campus located within the Nirimba Education Precinct. This location enables the school to provide students access to Western Sydney University resources and exclusive TAFE Nirimba courses.

Schofields Campus contains a multipurpose hall/workshop, called the 'PWS' (Performance Work Shop) and a new (completed in 2015) building called the 'CLS' (Cooperative Learning Space). This is accompanied by dedicated Science, Technological and Applied Studies, Art and Music Blocks. It also contains 2 basketball courts, configurable for various sports, i.e. Basketball, Netball, Volleyball, etc. & 2 large playing fields. One for Soccer/Footy and the other for AFL/Cricket. There is a pair of Cricket nets also on campus. There is also a large Library, Gathering area and Agriculture plot, which contains animals and plants, from Guinea Pigs, Chickens, Sheep and Goats.

Nirimba Campus offers a quiet, learning zone for Year 11 and 12 to focus on their higher education and HSC. It contains industrial Kitchens and Wood work rooms, as well as State of the art technology within the Hall. Common facilities such as the Basketball courts, Hall, Gymnasium, Performance Work Shop, Library, Learning Hub are shared with Wyndham College. This campus contains several, professional style soccer/footy fields, basketball courts (including indoor gym and court), as well a large array of texts in the library. With dedicated Science and Music rooms, as well as access to university labs and resources such as the University Library and Pool (Now closed indefinitely).

== See also ==
- List of Catholic schools in New South Wales
- Catholic education in Australia
- Catholic Education, Diocese of Parramatta
