= The Ponds, New South Wales =

The Ponds
- Suburb
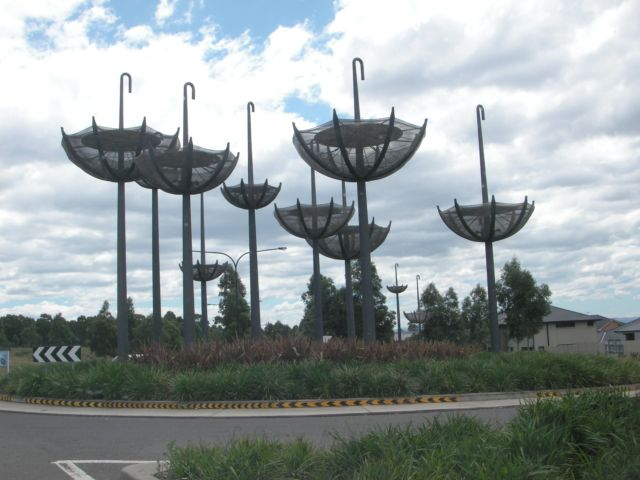
- The Float c. 2011

- Interactive map of The Ponds
- Country: Australia
- State: New South Wales
- City: Sydney
- LGA: City of Blacktown
- Location: 38 km (24 mi) NW of Sydney CBD
- Established: 2007

Government
  - State electorate: Riverstone
  - Federal division: Greenway
- Elevation: 57 m (187 ft)

Population
  - Total: 16,315 (2021 census)
- Postcode: 2769
Suburbs around The Ponds
Schofields	Rouse Hill	Kellyville
Quakers Hill	The Ponds	Kellyville Ridge
Quakers Hill	Parklea	Stanhope Gardens

The Ponds is a suburb of Sydney, in the state of New South Wales, Australia. The Ponds is about 40 kilometres (25 mi) west-northwest of the Sydney central business district in the Blacktown local government area. The 2021 census recorded the resident population of The Ponds as 16,315.

== History ==
"The Ponds" was a name designed to reflect the geography of the area and was derived from the nearby creek called "Second Ponds Creek", and the growing population. The Ponds was officially designated as a separate suburb in January 2007. It had previously been part of the suburbs of Kellyville and Kellyville Ridge.

== Population ==
The 2021 Census recorded 16,315 people in The Ponds. 45.2% of them were born in Australia. The next most common countries of birth were India 22.6%, Philippines 3.5%, China 2.6%, Pakistan 2.3% and Sri Lanka 1.9%. 41.7% of people spoke only English at home. Other languages spoken at home included Hindi 8.7%, Punjabi 6.8%, Gujarati 4.2%, Urdu 3.2% and Mandarin 3.2%. The most common responses for religion were Hinduism 25.1%, Catholic 19.1%, No Religion 14.8%, Islam 9.9% and Anglican 6.4%.

According to data from the 2011 census, the Australian Bureau of Statistics ranked The Ponds as the most advantaged suburb of Sydney by the use of twenty-five variables, including income, internet access, number of bedrooms and resident qualifications. With more than 71 per cent of the population aged over 15 years married, census data shows that The Ponds has the highest percentage of married people per suburb in Australia.

== Housing ==
The Ponds is situated in the North West growth corridor, where the first stage of a major shopping centre and commercial space have opened. A new suburb was designed to make the estate a new community. The first lots of land were released on 31 March 2007.

In 2012, The Ponds development received two industry awards; taking first place in the Residential Development and Sustainable Development categories at the UDIA NSW Austral Bricks Awards for Excellence.

== Education ==
The Ponds has two primary schools, John Palmer Public School, which opened in 2008 and Riverbank Public School, which opened in 2015. The Ponds also has a high school, The Ponds High School, which opened in 2015.

A "special needs" school, The Ponds School, also opened in 2015 and is the first of its kind in north western Sydney. It features specialised playground equipment, state-of-the-art technology and a hydrotherapy pool with ceiling hoists. The syllabus and curriculum is the same as all students in NSW with activities modified to suit the needs of all students.

== Hospitals ==
Hospitals nearby include Norwest Private, Westmead Hospital, The Children's Hospital at Westmead, Westmead Private, Mount Druitt Hospital, and Blacktown Hospital. In the near future, a hospital will be built in Rouse Hill, which will be less than a kilometre away.

== Churches ==
Several churches are nearby, including Stanhope Anglican Church, The Church of Jesus Christ of Latter-day Saints, Every Nation Christian Church, Blessed John XXIII Catholic Church, Our Lady of the Rosary, Rouse Hill Anglican Church, The Salvation Army – Rouse Hill Region, Hillsong Church, NewHope Baptist Church, Life Anglican Church Quakers Hill.

== Transport ==
=== Road ===
The main roads in the ponds are The Ponds Boulevard, Riverbank Drive, Ridgeline Drive, Hambledon Road, Stanhope Parkway and Schofields Road. Both the Westlink M7 and the M2 Hills Motorway provide easy road access to the suburb from the south and east, respectively.

=== Bus ===
The Ponds is served by Busways which provides services to Blacktown (734, 752), Rouse Hill (752), Schofields and Riverstone (734).

=== Rail ===
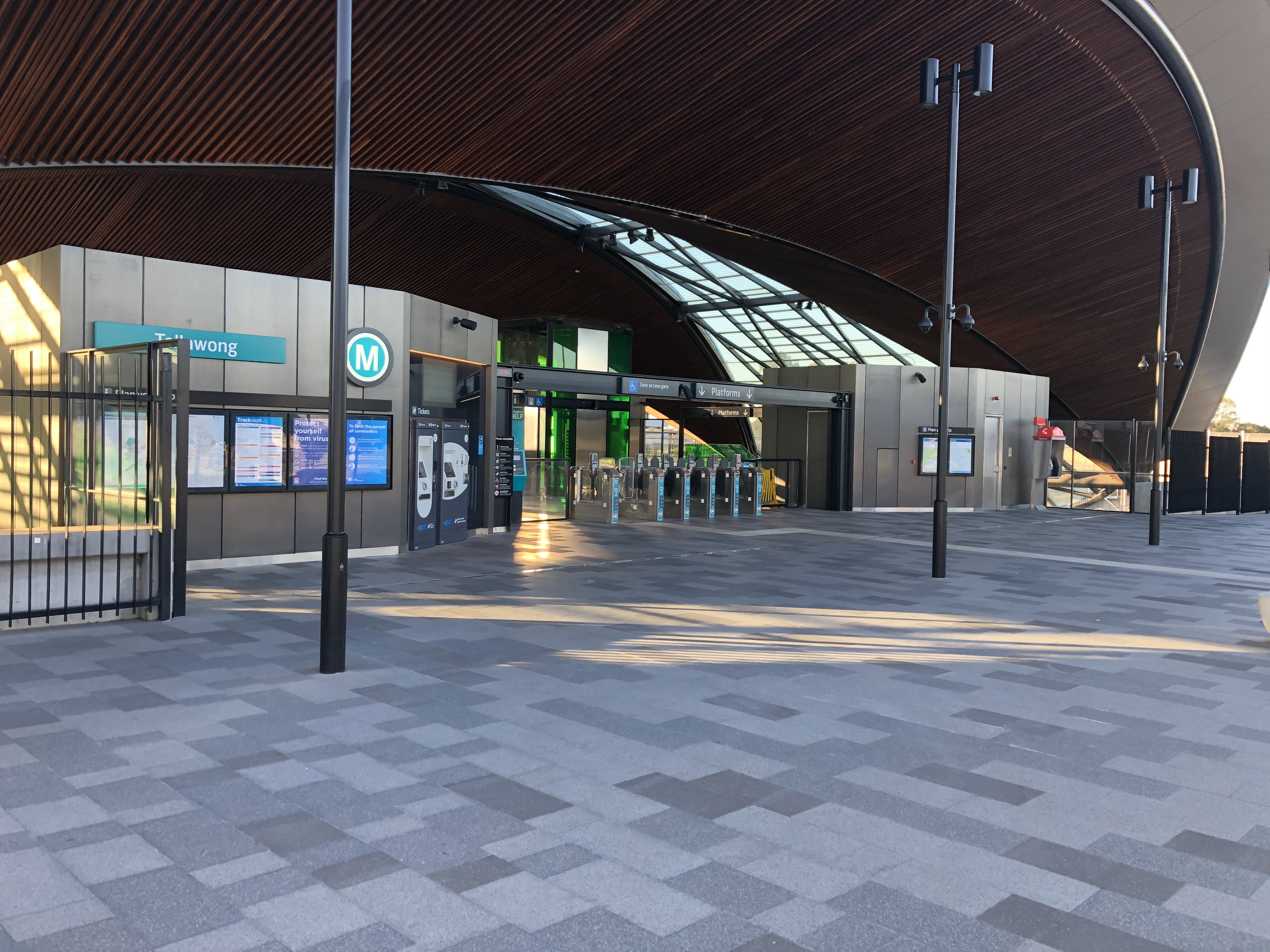
Tallawong station

Tallawong station on the Metro North West & Bankstown Line is the nearest station to The Ponds, providing services every four minutes to Norwest Business Park, Castle Hill, Macquarie Park, Chatswood, Town Hall and Central (Sydney CBD). The line opened on 26 May 2019. Cooee Busways provides an on demand service connecting The Ponds with Tallawong and Rouse Hill stations, whilst route 752 connects The Ponds with Rouse Hill station.

The nearest Sydney Trains stations are located at Schofields and Quakers Hill, with services to Blacktown, Parramatta, Richmond, Leppington and the Sydney central business district.

== Shopping ==
The Ponds Shopping Centre opened in 2015 adjacent to John Palmer Public School. It includes Woolworths as its anchor tenant, a number of cafes and restaurants, a news agency, a pharmacy, about 20 speciality shops, and a car park. It connects with the former sales and display centre which was renovated and turned into a community resource centre.

Rouse Hill Town Centre is about 1 km away. It has more than 250 stores in addition to Coles, Woolworths, Kmart, Big W and Reading Cinemas.

Stanhope Village is 3 kilometres (2 mi) from The Ponds, with Coles, Big W, Aldi and several speciality stores.

Other shopping nearby is at Marsden Park, Castle Towers and Westpoint Blacktown, about 12 kilometres (7.5 mi) away.

Based on the data from Australia Post and StarTrack couriers, residents in The Ponds receive the most online purchases in NSW.
