= Schofields, New South Wales =

Schofields
- Suburb
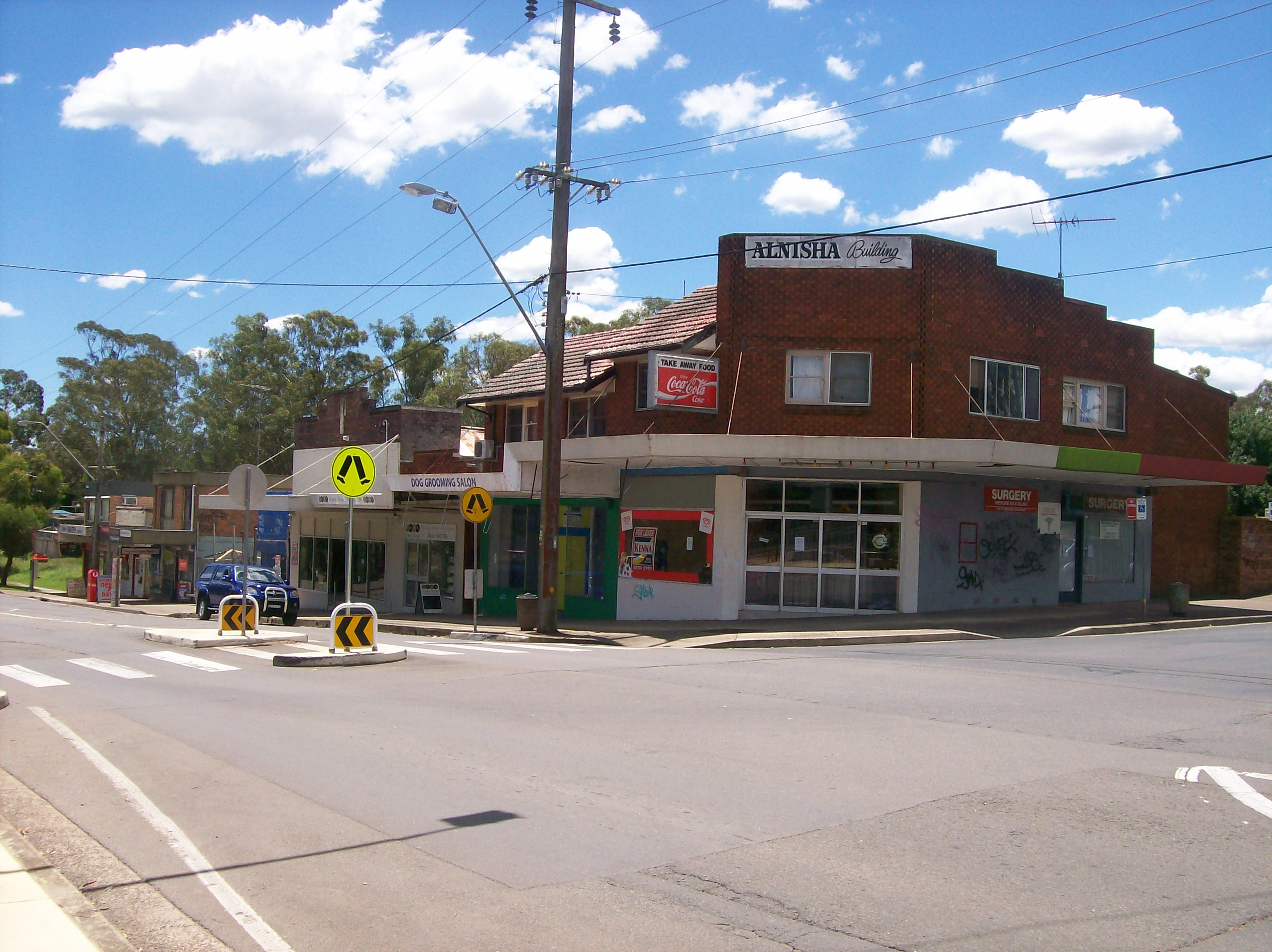
- Schofields village shops c. 2011

- Interactive map of Schofields
- Coordinates: 33°42′S 150°53′E
- Country: Australia
- State: New South Wales
- City: Sydney
- LGA: City of Blacktown
- Location: 40 km (25 mi) north-west of Sydney CBD

Government
  - State electorate: Riverstone
  - Federal divisions: Greenway; Chifley

Area
  - Total: 10.21 km^{2} (3.94 sq mi)
- Elevation: 29 m (95 ft)

Population
  - Total: 15,213 (2021 census)
  - Density: 1,490.0/km^{2} (3,859.1/sq mi)
- Postcode: 2762
Suburbs around Schofields
Angus	Richards Riverstone	Tallawong
Marsden Park	Schofields	The Ponds Rouse Hill
Colebee	Nirimba Fields	Quakers Hill

Schofields is a suburb in Western Sydney, in the state of New South Wales, Australia. Schofields is located 45 kilometres (28 mi) north-west of the Sydney central business district, in the Blacktown local government area. It is part of Greater Western Sydney's North West Growth Area.

== Demographics ==
As of the 2021 census, Schofields had an estimated population of 15,213. In 2001, Schofields had an estimated population of 3,012. Over the 20-year period, Schofield's population increased by 505.1%. The suburb is on the rural-urban fringe of Sydney, and is expanding rapidly. It is in the NSW Government's North West Growth Area. Schofields has numerous housing developments underway, which are expected to provide over 2,950 new homes.

The most common religion in Schofields is Hinduism (29.0%). The second largest religion is Catholic (18.4%). The most spoken language in Schofields is English (40.3%), with Hindi being the second most spoken language at 8.1%. The majority of people from Schofields identified as Indian (27.0%), followed closely by Australian (15.6%). The third largest ancestry was English at 13.9%.

== History ==
=== Early history of Schofields ===
Historical population
Year	Pop.	±%
2001	3,012	—
2006	3,908	+29.7%
2011	3,813	−2.4%
2016	4,983	+30.7%

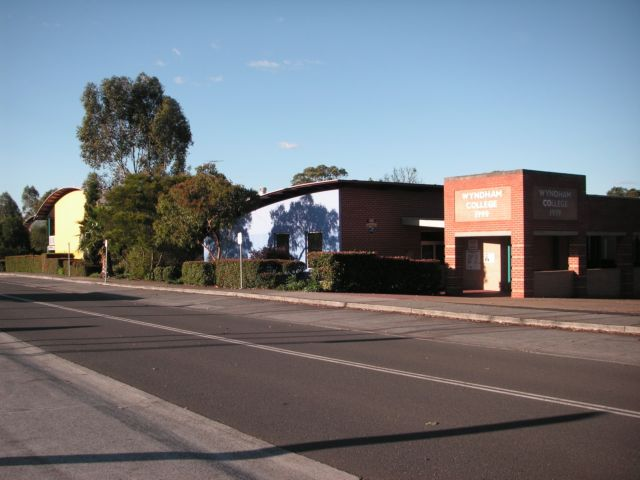
Wyndham College, Nirimba, Schofields.

John Schofield (1803–1884) was transported from England to the Colony of New South Wales for stealing when he was just 17 years old. At the time he was a silk weaver from Cheshire. He was transported aboard HMS Minerva in 1821 and was assigned to work for Thomas Harley, a free-settler, on his farm at Baulkham Hills. In 1828, Schofield was granted a Ticket of Leave, which allowed him to live freely within the district of Parramatta. In 1829, he married Bridget Harley, the daughter of his former employer. Schofield then rented Gillingham Farm, located near the Eastern Creek.

The Schofields delivered eight offspring; five males and three females. In 1841, Schofield bought three 0.25 acres (0.10 ha) blocks of land along the Windsor Road. Unfortunately, due to falling wool prices and a general state of depression in the colony, Schofield became bankrupt in 1843. New government concessions introduced a few years later allowed Schofield to buy 600 acres (240 ha) of land around the area now known as Schofields in 1845. In 1849, Schofield and two of his sons, William and Samuel, sailed to California in the hope of finding gold. He returned in 1850 with some gold, but their ship, the Rosetta Joseph struck land and became ship wrecked. Aboard life-boats and in very rough seas, the passengers were rescued at Port Macquarie after ten days. Schofield and his sons returned to their farm with enough gold to pay off most of his debts. Just before Christmas in 1851, Bridget Schofield died. The discovery of gold in New South Wales and a rise in the economy provided Schofield with enough money to pay off his mortgage and develop his keen interest in horseracing.

The railway line from Blacktown to Windsor opened in 1864 and passed through Schofield's land. In 1872, a stopping place was recognised on Schofield's land and a small platform made from railway sleepers was built after that to make boarding the train safer. This platform was known as Schofield's Siding. The name changed over the years to Schofields.

In his later life, Schofield set up a sawmill beside the railway line and used the trees from his paddocks in Schofields to supply timber for housing. John Schofield died in 1884.

=== Modern history ===
Schofield's Siding shortened the railway platform's name to Schofields on 6 July 1939. The biggest demographic shift occurred during World War II with the construction of RAAF Station Schofields, which brought an influx of military and support personnel, converting what had previously been flat farmland into an airfield.

The suburb boundaries of Schofields were changed in November 2020, resulting in the creation of new suburbs of Nirimba Fields and Tallawong in the south and northeast respectively.

== Parks, recreation and essential services ==
Schofields Park, on Station Street, is the home of the Riverstone Schofields Junior Soccer Football Club and Schofields Cricket Club.

The village also has a Community Hall that can be hired out for parties and is also regularly used by the local Church Group on Sunday mornings.

The village also has a NSW Rural Fire Service brigade, known as Schofields Bush Fire Brigade. They regularly attend house fires, car accidents, bush fires and most other emergencies in the area that require fire brigade attendance. A Woolworths Supermarket opened up across the road from the new Schofields railway station. Schofields Village Shopping Centre was completed in mid 2021 also across the road from the train station will include a Coles Supermarket and speciality stores.

The suburb was also home to the former Schofields Aerodrome and HMAS Nirimba and is now the suburb of Nirimba Fields.

== Transport ==
Schofields railway station is on the Richmond branch.

The Westlink M7 and M2 Hills Motorway provide easy road access from both the south and the east.

Busways provide commuter bus services to/from the suburb.

== Places of worship ==
In 1929, a hall located on St Albans Road was bought and opened as St Peter's Anglican Church the following year. Despite initial growth, St Peter's saw a decline in church attendance in the early 1970s. This decline could not be corrected and St Peter's closed in the 1980s and has now been demolished for housing development.

Schofields has a number places of worship that are currently active:

- Lankarama Buddhist Vihara (Sri Lankan Buddhist Temple) is located on Oak Street.
- Hope Church Sydney (Romanian Pentecostal Church) is located on Carnarvon Road.
- SMVS Swaminarayan Mandir Sydney (Hindu Temple) is located on Grange Ave.
- Schofields Church (Seventh Day Adventist Reform Movement) is located on Grange Ave.
