= Quakers Hill =

Suburb in Western Sydney, Australia

- Suburb
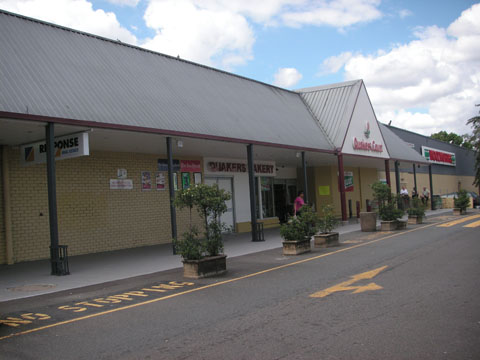
- Quakers Court shopping centre c. 2009

- Interactive map of Quakers Hill
- Country: Australia
- State: New South Wales
- City: Sydney
- LGA: City of Blacktown
- Location: 40 km (25 mi) north-west of Sydney CBD
- Established: 1904

Government
  - State electorate: Blacktown Riverstone
  - Federal divisions: Greenway; Chifley

Area
  - Total: 9.25 km^{2} (3.57 sq mi)
- Elevation: 33 m (108 ft)

Population
  - Total: 27,893 (2021 census)
  - Density: 3,015.5/km^{2} (7,810/sq mi)
- Postcode: 2763
Suburbs around Quakers Hill
Schofields	The Ponds	Parklea
Nirimba Fields	Quakers Hill	Acacia Gardens
Dean Park Glendenning Doonside	Woodcroft	Kings Park Marayong

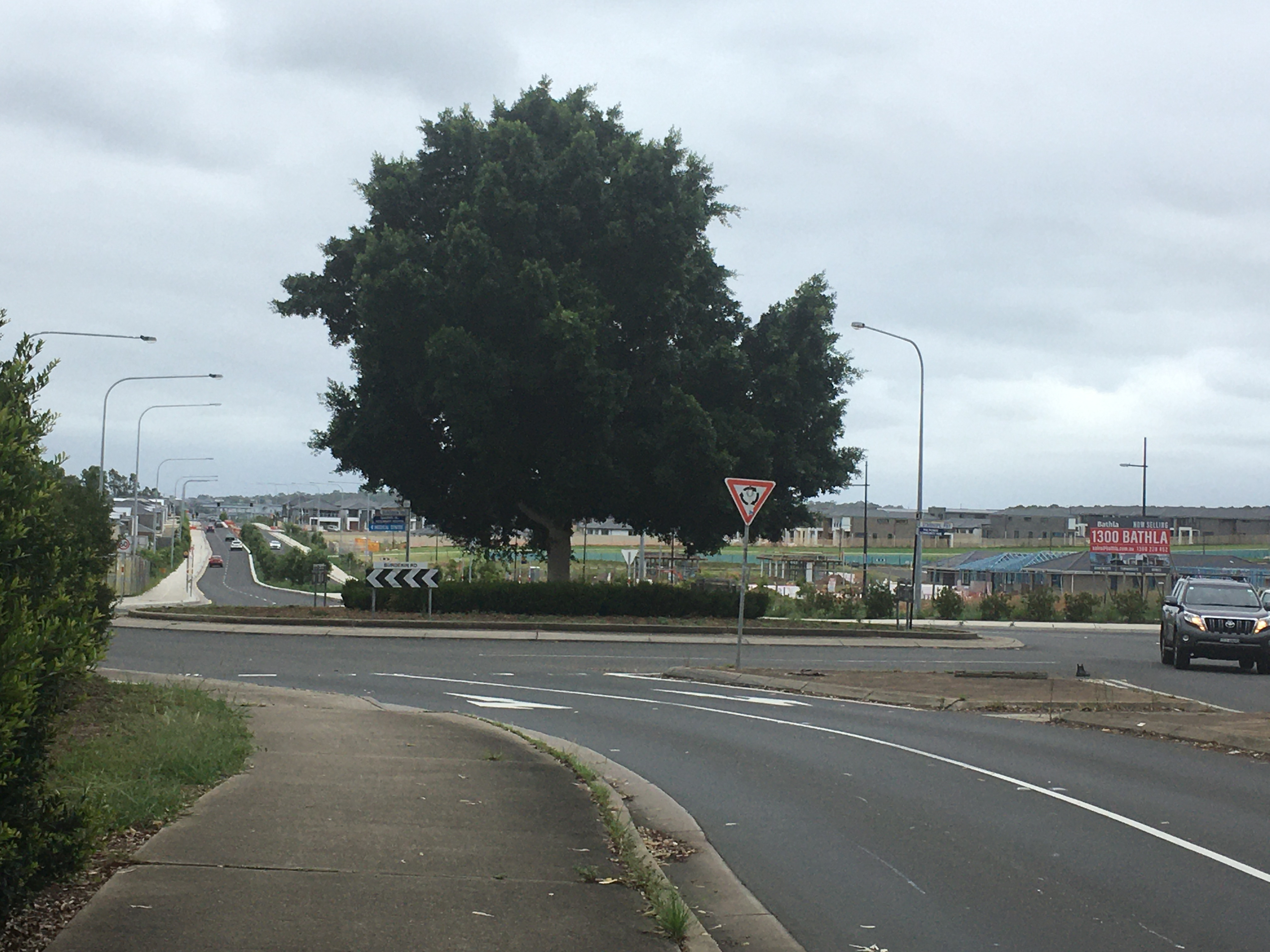
A roundabout connecting Hambledon Road, Burdekin Road, and the Stanhope Parkway.

Quakers Hill is a suburb of Sydney, in the state of New South Wales, Australia. It is 40 kilometres (25 mi) westnorth-west (WNW) of the Sydney central business district, in the local government area of the City of Blacktown. Quakers Hill is part of the Greater Western Sydney region. Quakers Hill is colloquially known as 'Quakers'.

== History ==
=== Etymology ===
The earliest recorded cartographic use in New South Wales of the name "Quaker" appears as "Quaker's Row", the former name of Church Street in Parramatta. In November 1788, Governor Arthur Phillip established a secondary settlement at Rose Hill, which was renamed Parramatta in June 1791. In July 1790, Phillip laid out a formal plan for the township. High Street (now George Street) was designated as the principal thoroughfare, intersected by a secondary street, 143 feet (43.6 metres) wide, extending from the southern bank of the Parramatta River. Phillip envisaged a town square with government buildings and an extended wharf at this location and named the street "Quaker's Row".

Alan Sharpe, in Pictorial History – Blacktown & District (2000), makes no reference to Phillip's July 1790 town plan.

Settlement at Parramatta proceeded rapidly. The Reverend Samuel Marsden established conformist, Anglican religious services in the district. According to local tradition, residents associated with Quaker's Row later relocated further west to an area that became known as Quakers Hill. It is said that they buried victims of the 1804 Castle Hill uprising in simple cairn-marked graves located in fields, paddocks and along creeks in the district.

The name "Quakers Hill" appears in an 1806 report by government surveyor James Meehan. The precise origin of the name remains uncertain. Subsequent documentary references are sparse until the mid to late nineteenth century, when Thomas Harvey applied the name to his property in what is now western Quakers Hill. Following the construction of the railway line in 1872, the local station was named Douglas' Siding (now Quakers Hill railway station) and retained that designation for more than thirty years. In 1904, Harvey's Quakers Hill estate was subdivided, prompting renewed use of the name. At the request of residents of the emerging village, the railway station was renamed Quakers Hill in 1905.

=== 20th Century ===
Postal services commenced in 1907, and a purpose-built post office opened in 1915. A school began operating in 1911 in the Presbyterian church hall at what is now Marayong, and Quakers Hill Public School enrolled its first students in 1912. During the 1920s, population growth accelerated. Shops were established in the vicinity of the railway station, and the Empire Theatre, opened in 1925, functioned as both a cinema and a venue for dances and community events. The village served as a service centre for surrounding farms.

From the 1960s, metropolitan expansion in Sydney extended into the Quakers Hill district, and the five-acre farms surrounding the village were progressively subdivided for residential development. In 1994, HMAS Nirimba, a former Royal Australian Navy training establishment on the suburb’s western boundary, was decommissioned and subsequently redeveloped as an educational precinct. In 1996, land in the north-eastern part of Quakers Hill was excised to form the new suburb of Acacia Gardens. In November 2020, a small portion of Quakers Hill north of Quakers Hill Parkway was incorporated into the newly gazetted suburb of Nirimba Fields./

=== 21st Century ===
==== 2011 nursing home fire ====
On 18 November 2011, an early morning fire occurred at the Quakers Hill Nursing Home (operated by Opal Healthcare) at 35 Hambledon Road, Quakers Hill. The blaze resulted in the deaths of 11 elderly residents, seriously injured others, and led to the evacuation of up to 100 people. Three residents died at the scene, and a further eight died in hospital from injuries sustained in the fire.

The fire was determined to have been deliberately lit in two separate locations within the facility and was treated by police as suspicious. A nurse employed at the home, 36-year-old Roger Kingsley Dean, was subsequently charged with multiple counts of murder. In 2013, he was convicted and sentenced to life imprisonment without the possibility of parole.

== Transport ==
Public transport to and from Quakers Hill is provided by train and a number of bus services by Busways, namely routes: 731 (eastern outskirts), 732 (west), 734 (northern outskirts), 745 (all over), 752 (all over) and 753 (south). Quakers Hill railway station is on the Richmond line. Bus services connect to Sydney Metro network at Tallawong, Rouse Hill and Bella Vista stations.

Quakers Hill has experienced much road development over recent years including the construction of a new road leading directly to the education precinct, bypassing the town centre. The Westlink M7, which links the suburb directly to all major routes in and out of the greater Sydney region, opened in December 2005. Following this opening the road overpass for the Quakers Hill Parkway has been widened from two to four lanes, including the bridge over the railway line, improving toll-free traffic flow between Richmond and Sunnyholt Roads.

== Education ==
Quakers Hill is home to numerous schools and educational institutions. The oldest is Quakers Hill Public School, opened in 1912. Two other public primary schools (Barnier and Hambledon) were opened in the 1990s to cope with suburb's growing population. High schools in Quakers Hill are split between Quakers Hill High School, catering to Years 7–12, and Wyndham College, years 11–12. There is also a Catholic primary school (Mary Immaculate) and high school (Terra Sancta College). Post-secondary education is serviced by Nirimba TAFE College and the University of Western Sydney, Blacktown Campus. Four of these facilities (UWS, Nirimba TAFE, Wyndham and St John Paul II) are located together in the Nirimba Education Precinct.

== Demographics ==
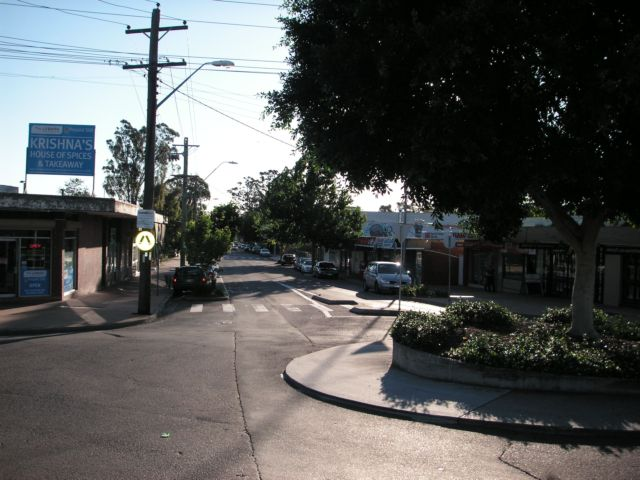
Shops in old part of Quakers Hill

Quakers Hill has become a fairly populated suburb, experiencing major growth in recent years. In 1991, the population was approximately 14,630 (1991 ABS Census) and in 1996, the population had grown by more than 4,000 people to 18,759 (1996 ABS Census). By 2006, the population of Quakers Hill had risen to 25,015. The 2016 ABS Census recorded a further increase to 27,080 people, with the 2021 census recording 27,893 people.

In the 2021 census, the majority of people from Quakers Hill were born in Australia (52.8%). The second top response was India (15.8%). Most people identified as having an Australian ancestry (21.1%), followed by English (19.3%).

Most people from Quakers Hill identified as Catholic in 2021 (24.9%), followed by No Religion (18.6%).

== Notable residents ==
- Mel McLaughlin, sports journalist
- Fabrice Lapierre, long jumper
- Miracle, hip hop artist
- Aaron Mooy, footballer for the Socceroos and Celtic
- Michael Clifford, guitarist in the band 5 Seconds of Summer
- Matthew Norman convicted drug smuggler and member of the Bali nine

== See also ==
- Quakers Hill Press
- Casefile True Crime Podcast – Case 06: Roger Dean, which covers this case, including details of the fire and trial
