= Nirimba Fields =

- Suburb
- Interactive map of Nirimba Fields
- Coordinates: 33°43′22″S 150°52′33″E
- Country: Australia
- State: New South Wales
- City: Sydney
- LGA: Blacktown City Council
- Location: 35 km (22 mi) north-west of Sydney CBD
- Established: 2020

Government
  - State electorate: Riverstone
  - Federal division: Chifley

Area
  - Total: 2.60 km^{2} (1.00 sq mi)
- Elevation: 20 m (66 ft)

Population
  - Total: 1,632 (SAL 2021)
- Postcode: 2763
Suburbs around Nirimba Fields
Schofields	Schofields	Schofields
Colebee	Nirimba Fields	Quakers Hill
Dean Park	Quakers Hill	Quakers Hill

Nirimba Fields is a suburb of Sydney in the state of New South Wales, Australia. Nirimba Fields is in north-west Sydney in the local government area of Blacktown. Nirimba is a Dharug word meaning pelican.

== History ==
Nirimba Fields was gazetted on 6 November 2020. A large portion of the suburb was previously part of Schofields, with a small portion in the south previously part of Quakers Hill.

Nirimba Fields was the site of the former RAAF Schofields Aerodrome. The Nirimba Education Precinct, including Wyndham College is located south of the Schofields Aerodrome site. The precinct was redeveloped in 1995 from the former HMAS Nirimba base, which was commissioned by the Royal Australian Navy in 1953 and used until 1994.

== Education ==
The Nirimba Education Precinct is located within the suburb, and comprises Western Sydney University's The College, Wyndham College, Nirimba TAFE NSW, St John Paul II Catholic College and Wyndham College. As of November 2020, there are 8362 students, 1255 staff and 48 residents currently studying, working or living within the precinct, a total of 9665 people.
