= Tallawong =

- Suburb
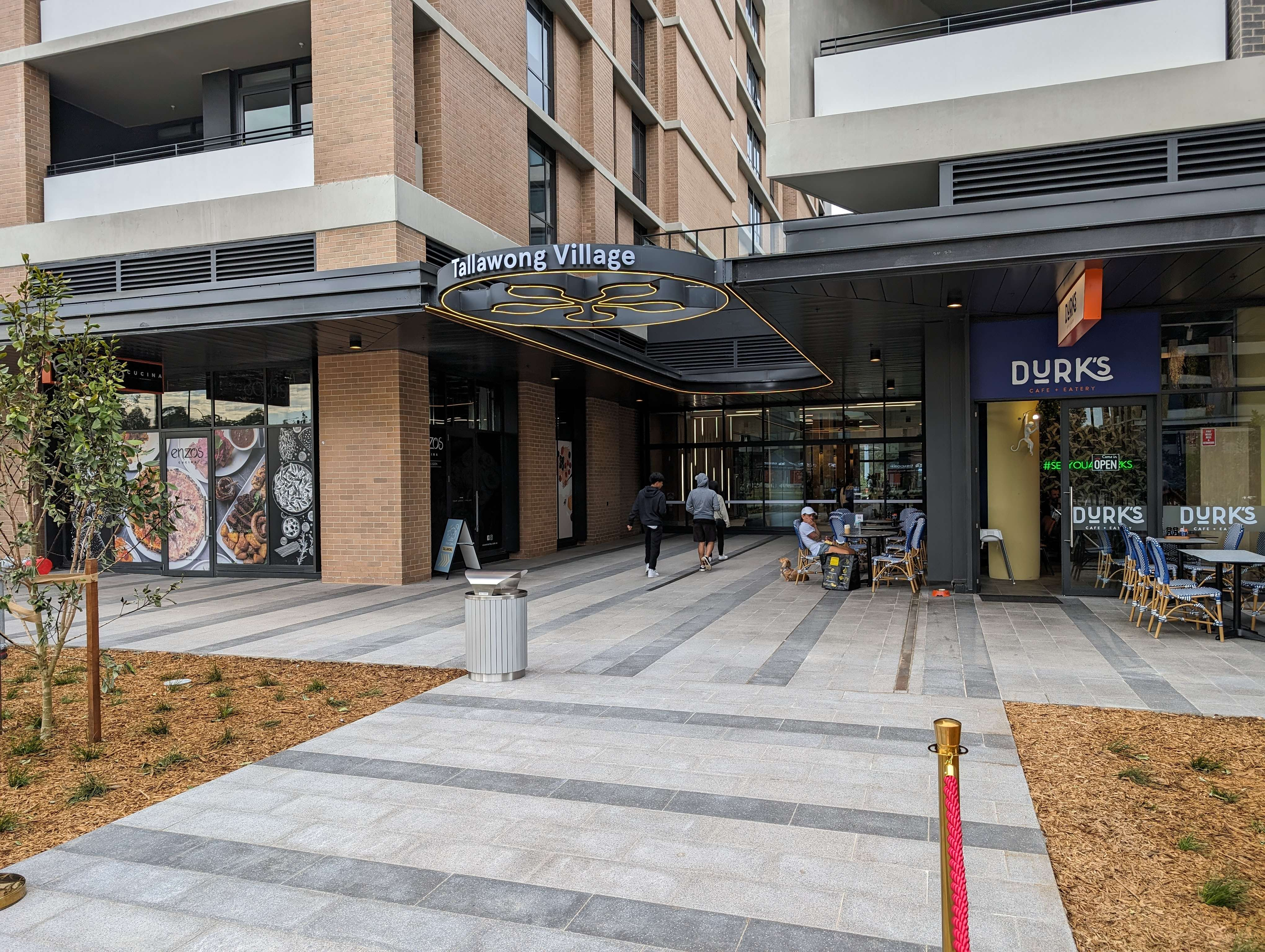
- Tallawong Village, September 2024

- Interactive map of Tallawong
- Coordinates: 33°41′28″S 150°53′54″E
- Country: Australia
- State: New South Wales
- City: Sydney
- Location: 35 km (22 mi) north-west of Sydney CBD
- Established: 2020

Government
  - State electorate: Riverstone
  - Federal division: Greenway

Area
  - Total: 4.12 km^{2} (1.59 sq mi)
- Elevation: 68 m (223 ft)

Population
  - Total: 6,570 (2021 census)
  - Density: 1,594.7/km^{2} (4,130/sq mi)
- Postcode: 2762
Suburbs around Tallawong
Riverstone	Riverstone	Rouse Hill
Schofields	Tallawong	Rouse Hill
Schofields	Schofields; The Ponds	The Ponds

Tallawong is a suburb of Sydney in the state of New South Wales, Australia. Tallawong is in north-west Greater Sydney Area in the local government area of Blacktown. It is named after the metro station located within its boundaries, which opened in May 2019. Tallawong is a Dharug word meaning apple gum tree.

== History ==
The majority of the suburb used to be part of Schofields. However, Tallawong station in the southeast is located in what used to be part of Rouse Hill. Until the creation of the suburb of Tallawong, there were two metro stations within the suburb of Rouse Hill, the other being Rouse Hill station.

Tallawong was gazetted on 6 November 2020.

Tallawong Public School opened at 24 Macquarie Road, Rouse Hill on 22 March 2026. During the planning and construction of the primary school, Tallawong Public School was temporarily located on the grounds of Riverstone Public School.

== Transport ==
Tallawong railway station, opened in May 2019, is located in the southeast portion of the suburb between Tallawong Road and Cudgegong Road. It is the terminus of the Metro North West & Bankstown Line which provides high frequency rail services to Sydenham.

Bus stops are located outside the metro station on Implexa Parade. They are serviced by Busways routes 732 to Rouse Hill, 742 and 748 to Marsden Park, 747 to Riverstone. Nightride bus route N92 operates between Tallawong and Sydney central business district outside metro operation hours.
