= Glendenning, New South Wales =

Glendenning
- Suburb
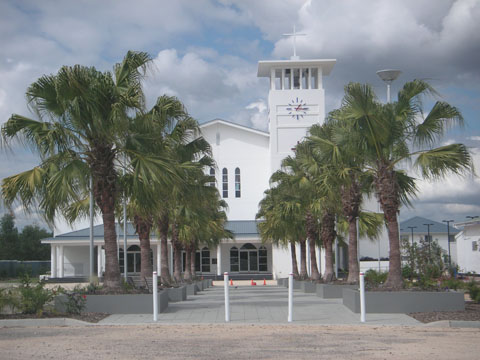
- Tongan Wesleyan Church in Glendenning

- Interactive map of Glendenning
- Country: Australia
- State: New South Wales
- City: Sydney
- LGA: City of Blacktown
- Location: 44 km (27 mi) W of Sydney CBD
- Established: 1987

Government
  - State electorate: Mount Druitt
  - Federal division: Chifley
- Elevation: 44 m (144 ft)

Population
  - Total: 5,196 (2021 census)
- Postcode: 2761
Suburbs around Glendenning
Colebee	Dean Park	Quakers Hill
Oakhurst	Glendenning	Doonside
Plumpton	Rooty Hill	Doonside

Glendenning is a suburb of Sydney, in the state of New South Wales, Australia. Glendenning is located 44 kilometres west of the Sydney central business district, in the local government area of the City of Blacktown and is part of the Greater Western Sydney region.

== History ==
Glendenning was officially declared a suburb in 1987. It is named after William Glendenning, a Plumpton butcher who, in the early 1900s, had a slaughteryard in Lamb Street in what is now Glendenning. William Scott Glendinning was the son of James Glendinning and Agnes Scott. He was born in Glasgow Scotland on 17 December 1864. His surname on his birth registration is Glendinning.

== Landmarks ==
The Free Wesleyan Church of Tonga on the corner of Glendenning Road and Lamb Street was officially opened in October 2008 by George Tupou V, the King of Tonga. Bus operator Busways has a depot at 150 Glendenning Road.

== Demographics ==
Glendenning had 5,196 residents in the 2021 census. The area could be characterised as classic mortgage belt with 68.4% of homes being purchased. The median housing loan repayment of $2,167 per month was higher than average but so too was the median household income of $2,203 per week. The number of couples with children (61.6%) was well above average and the median age of residents (33) was well below the national median. Aboriginal and Torres Strait Islander people made up 2.7% of the population. 51.5% of people were born in Australia. The next most common countries of birth were India 13.1%, Philippines 12.3%, Fiji 2.7%, New Zealand 2.3% and Pakistan 1.5%. 46.5% of people spoke only English at home. Other languages spoken at home included Punjabi 11.8%, Tagalog 8.1%, Hindi 3.8%, Filipino 3.2% and Arabic 2.6%. The most common responses for religion were Catholic 30.7%, No Religion 13.6%, Sikhism 10.4%, Hinduism 10.1% and Islam 6.9%.

== Notable residents ==
- Marlisa Punzalan, winner of the sixth season of The X Factor Australia
