= Colebee, New South Wales =

Colebee
- Suburb
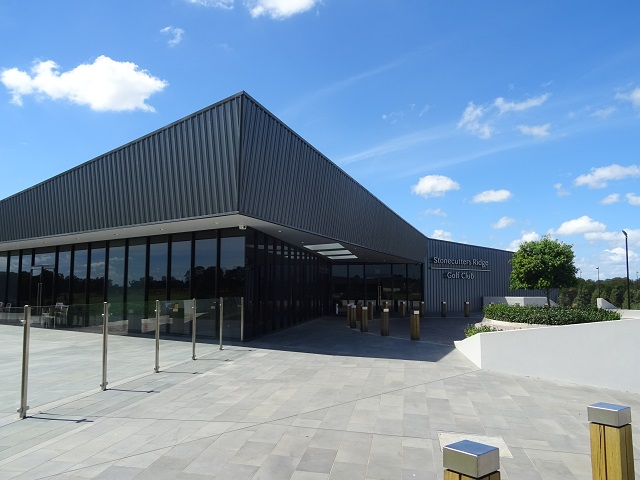
- Stonecutters Ridge Golf Club

- Interactive map of Colebee
- Coordinates: 33°43′16″S 150°51′18″E
- Country: Australia
- State: New South Wales
- City: Sydney
- LGA: City of Blacktown
- Location: 47 km (29 mi) west of Sydney CBD

Government
  - State electorate: Mount Druitt Riverstone
  - Federal division: Chifley
- Elevation: 36 m (118 ft)

Population
  - Total: 4,914 (2021 census)
- Postcode: 2761
Suburbs around Colebee
Marsden Park	Schofields	Schofields
Marsden Park	Colebee	Nirimba Fields
Hassall Grove Oakhurst	Dean Park	Quakers Hill

Colebee is a suburb of Sydney, in the state of New South Wales, Australia. Colebee is located 47 kilometres west of the Sydney central business district, in the local government area of the City of Blacktown and is part of the Western Sydney region.

== History ==
Colebee was named after C. Colebee who is believed to have been the first indigenous Australian to have been granted land in the Blacktown area, at Plumpton Ridge. He was the son of Yarramundi.

== Heritage listings ==
Colebee has a number of heritage-listed sites, including:

- Richmond Road: Colebee and Nurragingy Land Grant
