= Division of Chifley =

Australian federal electoral division

Coordinates: 33.735°S 150.838°E

Chifley Australian House of Representatives Division
- Interactive map of electorate boundaries from the 2025 federal election
- Created: 1969
- MP: Ed Husic
- Party: Labor
- Namesake: Ben Chifley
- Electors: 116,687 (2025)
- Area: 113 km^{2} (43.6 sq mi)
- Demographic: Outer metropolitan
Electorates around Chifley:
Lindsay	Macquarie	Greenway
Lindsay	Chifley	Greenway
Lindsay	McMahon	McMahon

The Division of Chifley is an Australian electoral division in the state of New South Wales.

Chifley is located in outer western Sydney. It includes Rooty Hill, Doonside, Woodcroft, Dean Park, parts of Marayong and Blacktown, and all the suburbs of the Mt Druitt housing estate.

== History ==
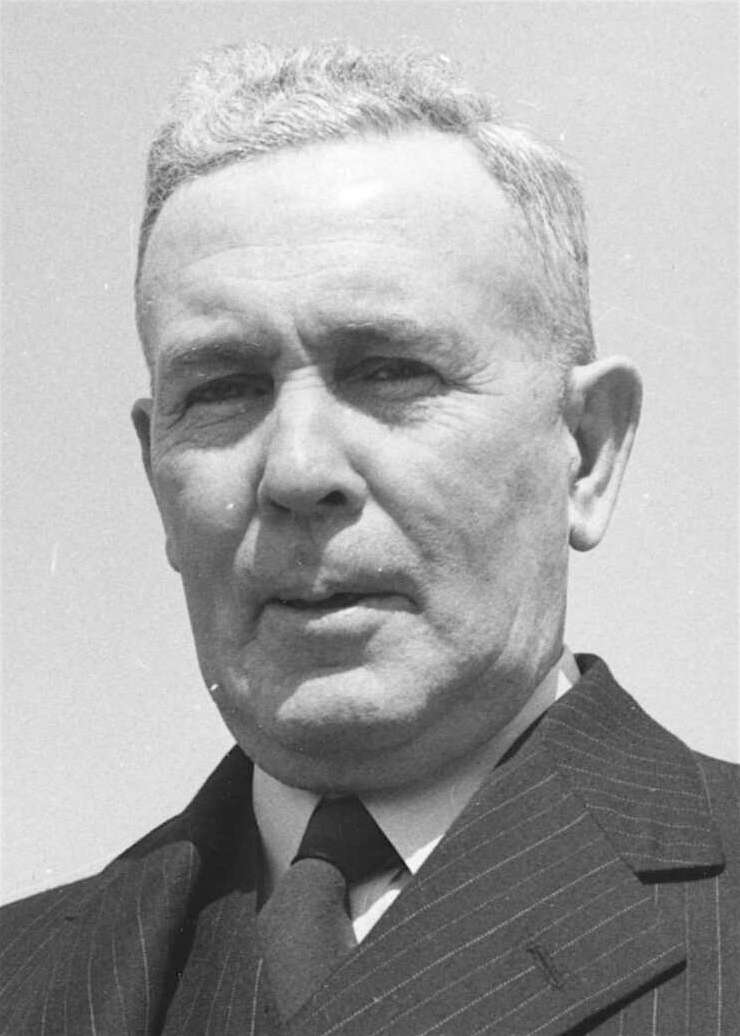
Ben Chifley, the division's namesake

The division was created in 1969 and is named for Ben Chifley, who was Prime Minister of Australia 1945–49.

Chifley has been won by the Labor Party at every federal election since its creation in 1969, and at the 2007 federal election was one of Labor's safest seats. The Member for Chifley, since the 2010 federal election, is Ed Husic, a member of the Australian Labor Party.

== Geography ==
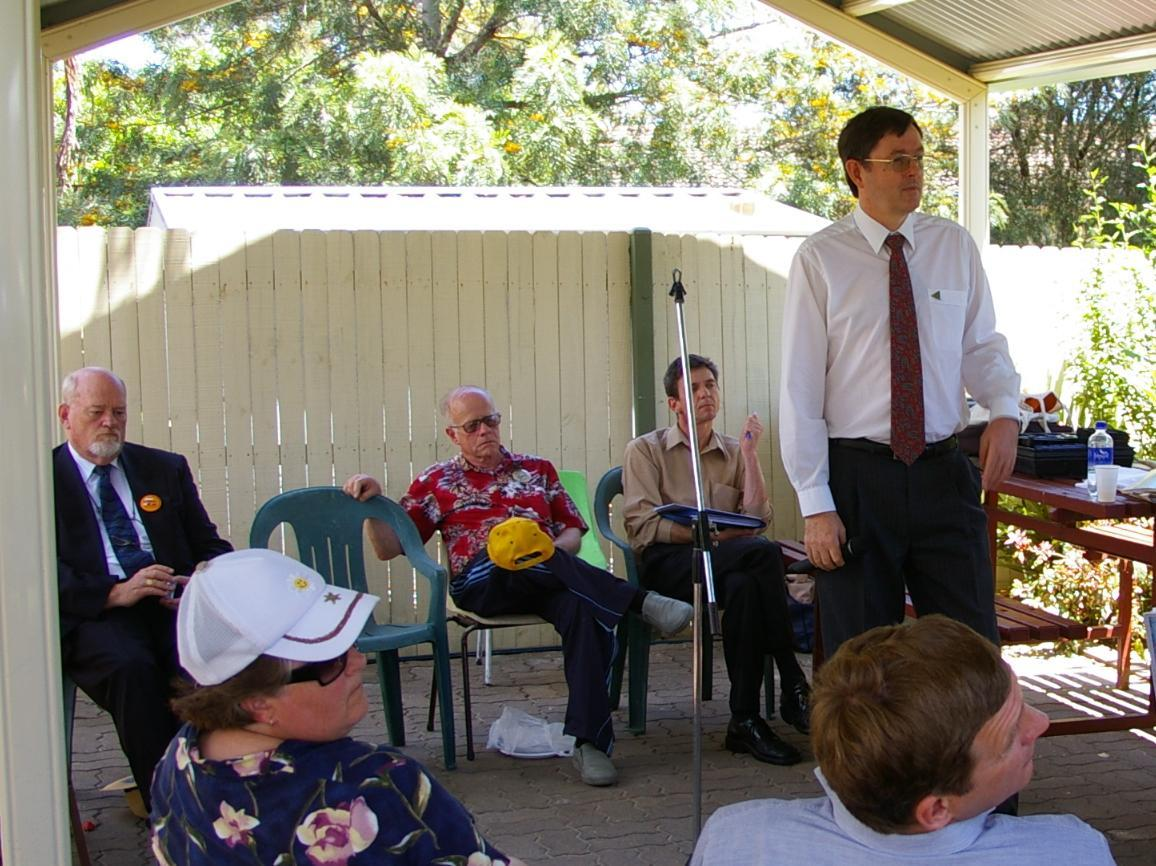
Four of the candidates who stood for election for the Division of Chifley at the 2007 federal election address electors at a public meeting in Shalvey on 11 November 2007. They are (seated at rear) Roger Price (ALP), Dave Vincent (CDP), James Cogan (Socialist) and (standing) John Forrester (Greens)

Since 1984, federal electoral division boundaries in Australia have been determined at redistributions by a redistribution committee appointed by the Australian Electoral Commission. Redistributions occur for the boundaries of divisions in a particular state, and they occur every seven years, or sooner if a state's representation entitlement changes or when divisions of a state are malapportioned.

When the division was created in 1968, the division covered what was previously part of the division of Mitchell. It included areas such as Blacktown, Plumpton, St Marys and Marsden Park.

Since the division was created, it has always been located in the western suburbs of Sydney. Since the 2024 redistribution, it includes the suburbs of Angus, Bidwill, Blackett, Colebee, Dean Park, Dharruk, Doonside, Emerton, Glendenning, Hassall Grove, Hebersham, Lethbridge Park, Marayong, Marsden Park, Melonba, Mount Druitt, Nirimba Fields, Oakhurst, Plumpton, Richards, Rooty Hill, Ropes Crossing, Shalvey, Shanes Park, Tregear, Whalan, Willmot, and Woodcroft; as well as parts of Blacktown, Eastern Creek, Quakers Hill, Riverstone, and Schofields.

== Demographics ==
Chifley is home to immigrant communities from the Philippines, India, and Fiji, and is heavily Catholic at 30.8% with a larger-than-average Muslim population at 8.3%. Some voters are socially conservative, particularly those of religious background.

The current MP is Ed Husic, a member of the Australian Labor Party. Husic himself comes from a Bosnian Muslim family, but describes himself as non-practising Muslim.

== Members ==
Image	Member	Party	Term	Notes
	John Armitage (1920–2009)	Labor	25 October 1969 – 4 February 1983	Previously held the Division of Mitchell. Retired
	Russ Gorman (1926–2017)	Labor	5 March 1983 – 1 December 1984	Transferred to the Division of Greenway
	Roger Price (1945–)	Labor	1 December 1984 – 19 July 2010	Served as Chief Government Whip in the House under Rudd and Gillard. Retired
	Ed Husic (1970–)	Labor	21 August 2010 – present	Incumbent. Served as minister under Albanese

== Election results ==
2025 Australian federal election: Chifley
Party	Candidate	Votes	%	±%
Labor	Ed Husic	47,078	52.65	−0.35
Liberal	Allan Green	17,613	19.70	−4.92
Greens	Sukhjinder Singh	8,724	9.76	+4.08
One Nation	Tony Nikolic	5,338	5.97	−0.24
Family First	Jamie Green	5,336	5.97	+5.97
Trumpet of Patriots	Ryan Archer	2,237	2.50	+2.50
Animal Justice	Rohan Laxmanalal	1,569	1.75	+1.75
Independent	Leigh Burns	1,519	1.70	+1.70
Total formal votes		89,414	86.45	−4.66
Informal votes		14,013	13.55	+4.66
Turnout		103,427	88.67	+3.93
Two-party-preferred result
Labor	Ed Husic	62,440	69.83	+6.18
Liberal	Allan Green	26,974	30.17	−6.18
Labor hold		Swing	+6.18	

2022 Australian federal election: Chifley
Party	Candidate	Votes	%	±%
Labor	Ed Husic	51,236	52.72	−1.58
Liberal	Jugandeep Singh	24,046	24.74	−3.18
One Nation	Amit Batish	6,034	6.21	+6.21
Greens	Sujan Selventhiran	5,622	5.78	+0.72
United Australia	Zvetanka Raskov	5,149	5.30	+0.76
Liberal Democrats	Ben Roughley	3,263	3.36	+3.36
Independent	Ammar Khan	1,839	1.89	+0.15
Total formal votes		97,189	91.12	+0.78
Informal votes		9,471	8.88	−0.78
Turnout		106,660	87.95	−2.01
Two-party-preferred result
Labor	Ed Husic	61,682	63.47	+1.10
Liberal	Jugandeep Singh	35,507	36.53	−1.10
Labor hold		Swing	+1.10	

Alluvial diagram for preference flows in the seat of Chifley in the 2022 federal election. The winning candidate got over 50% of first preference votes, so this alluvial diagram is indicative only, and preference flows were not used to determine the final result. The preference flows were used to determine the two-candidate-preferred.
