= RAAF Station Schofields =

Aerodrome in New South Wales, Australia

- Schofields, Sydney, New South Wales in Australia
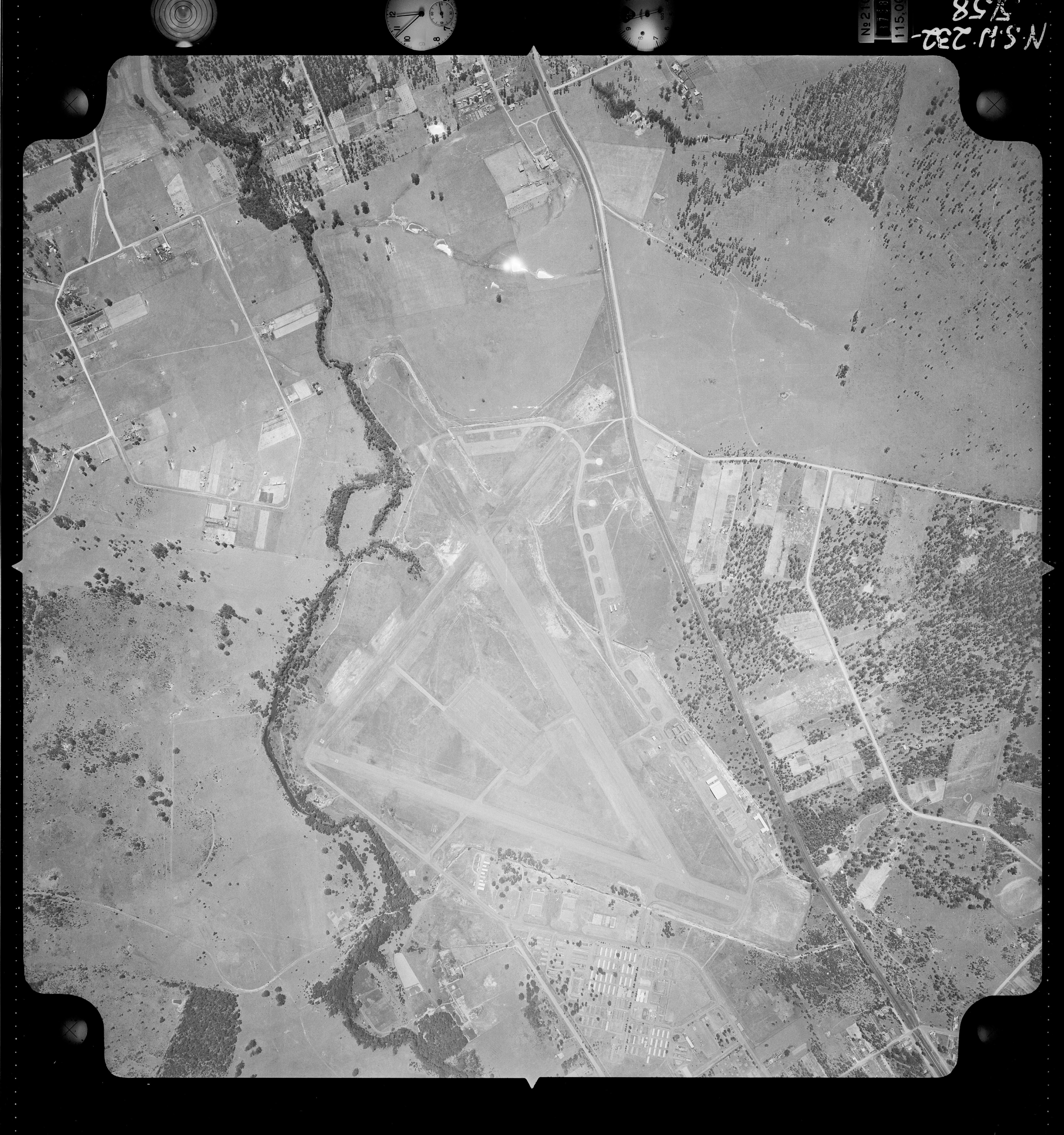
- The airbase pictured in 1955 as it was flown over by the NSW Government

Site information
- Type: Military air base; aerodrome
- Owner: Department of Defence (1942 – ??)
- Operator: (United Kingdom) Royal Australian Air Force (1942 – 1945); Royal Air Force (1945 – 1946); Royal Australian Air Force (1946 – 1952); Royal Australian Navy (1953 – 1956); Royal Australian Navy (1956 – 1994); Civil Aviation Authority (1994)

Location
- Location in New South Wales
- Coordinates: 33°42′49″S 150°52′16″E

Site history
- Fate: Decommissioned; Dismantled and removed

RAAF Station Schofields is a former Royal Australian Air Force (RAAF) military air base and aerodrome located at Schofields, a suburb of Sydney in New South Wales, Australia. The aerodrome was used during World War II and was in operation between 1942 and 1944.

== History ==
The aerodrome was constructed for use as a satellite aerodrome for RAAF Base Richmond. Identified as a base for the Royal Navy's Fleet Air Arm of the British Pacific Fleet on 5 February 1945 and commissioned as HMS Nabthorpe, later renamed HMS Nabstock. HMS Nabstock was decommissioned on 9 June 1946 and the aerodrome was returned to RAAF control.

In 1949, part of the aerodrome was utilised to house migrants, some 21 huts being outfitted as accommodation for 300 people, known as Schofields Migrant Hostel. the migrant hostel closed on 4 February 1951.

The Royal Australian Navy (RAN) opened a RAN Aircraft Repair Yard (RANARY), following the formation of the RAN Fleet Air Arm at the aerodrome in 1951, and was known as HMAS ALBATROSS II, RANARY Schofields. In January 1952, the RAAF transferred control of the base to the RAN, however the RAAF remained in residence until leaving in September 1952. The RAAF transport and fighter units moved to the larger bases at RAAF Base Richmond and RAAF Base Williamtown. Commissioned as HMAS Nirimba on 1 April 1953 as a joint RANARY and technical training establishment for RAN Fleet Air Arm. HMAS Nirimba decommissioned on 25 February 1994.

=== Civil aviation ===
The aerodrome at Schofields had been operating as a civil field for many years until it too finally closed to flying in 1994. Hosted by the Schofields Flying Club, the aerodrome was the venue of Australia's first international Air Show on 8 November 1977, called the Schofields Jubilee Air Show attracting up to 300 aircraft, and exhibits from around the world. Schofields was the host to airshows in 1978, 1979, 1983 and 1985; and the Schofields Flying Club organised the 1988 Australian Bicentennial Airshow at RAAF Base Richmond; and ran a second and final airshow at RAAF Base Richmond in 1991 to celebrate the RAAF's 70th Anniversary. These events were a precursor to the Avalon Airshow.

=== Other uses ===
Schofields, subsequently titled Schofields Defence Depot, was used as a rehearsal ground for the Opening Ceremony of the Sydney 2000 Olympic Games. A Wall & Rose Garden Memorial to the Armed forces that have occupied the area in the past has been dedicated on the site and a Commemorative Plaque was erected on the site by The Naval Historical Society of Australia.

In the late 1950s the aerodrome was used as a venue for motor racing by several Sydney car clubs, with the opening meeting taking place on 6 July 1958. The circuit used was approximately 4.0 kilometres (2.5 mi) in length, and used one main runway and an access road in a roughly oval shape. While fast and open, the temporary nature of the track meant that volunteer officials had to set up and dismantle facilities such as grandstands, covered pits and timing towers all on the same day. The last meeting was in 1959, after which the base was re-commissioned as HMAS Nirimba.

In 2005 the aerodrome was used during the filming of Stealth, an American military science fiction action feature film starring Josh Lucas, Jessica Biel, Jamie Foxx and Sam Shepard.

The aerodrome has since now been dismantled and removed, leaving the aerodrome area of HMAS Nirimba with just some old and weathered tarmac.

== See also ==
- List of airports in Greater Sydney
- List of airports in New South Wales
