= Plumpton, New South Wales =

Plumpton
- Suburb
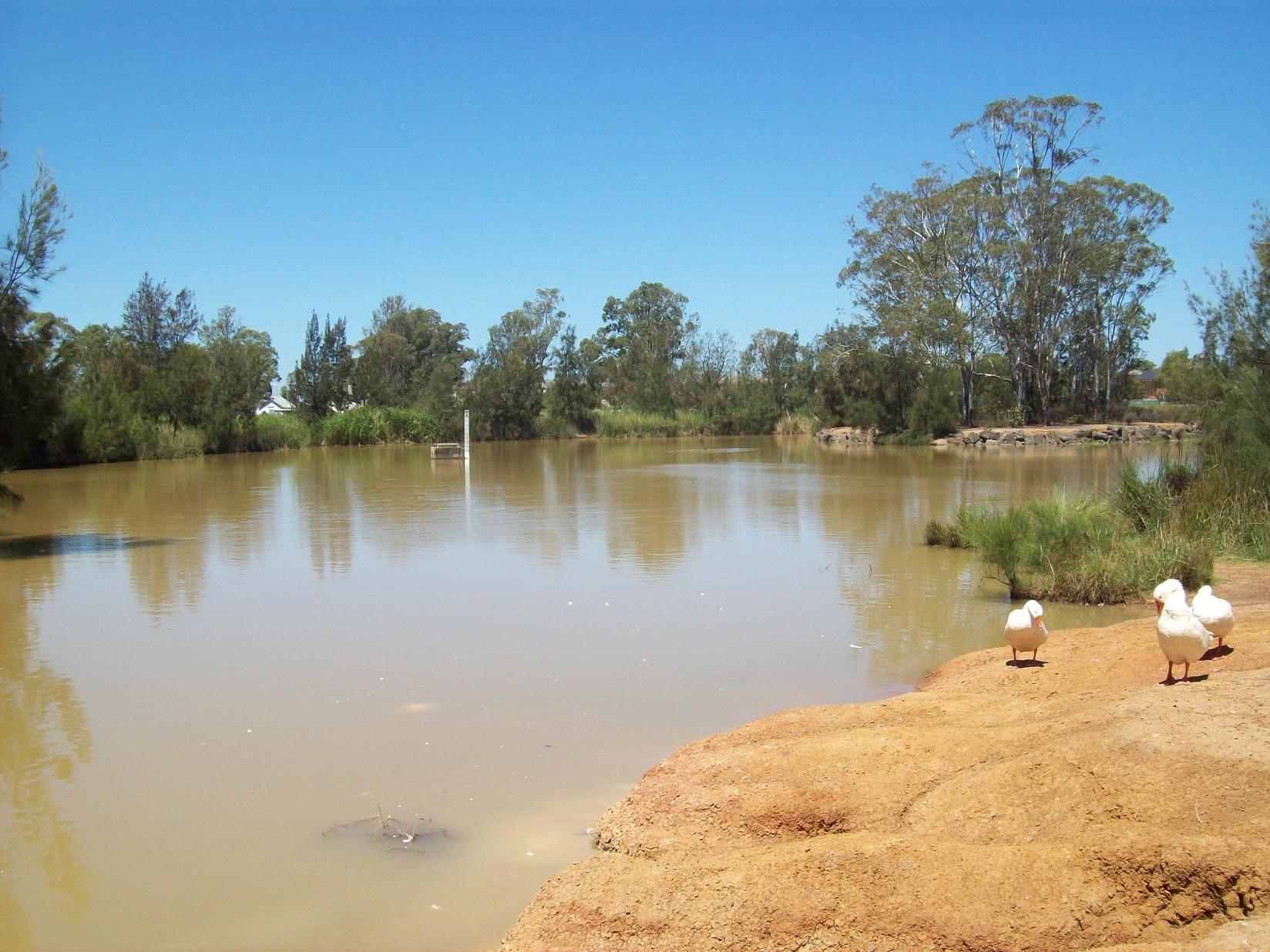
- Small lake in Plumpton Park

- Interactive map of Plumpton
- Country: Australia
- State: New South Wales
- City: Sydney
- LGA: City of Blacktown
- Location: 45 km (28 mi) west of Sydney CBD

Government
  - State electorate: Mount Druitt
  - Federal division: Chifley

Area
  - Total: 3.0 km^{2} (1.2 sq mi)
- Elevation: 51 m (167 ft)

Population
  - Total: 10,070 (2021 census)
  - Density: 3,360/km^{2} (8,690/sq mi)
- Postcode: 2761
Suburbs around Plumpton
Hebersham	Oakhurst	Glendenning
Hebersham	Plumpton	Glendenning
Mount Druitt	Rooty Hill	Rooty Hill

Plumpton is a western suburb of Sydney. It is located 45 km (28 mi) west of the Sydney central business district, in the local government area of the City of Blacktown. In 2021, the population was 10,070. As shown in the 2021 Australian census, Plumpton is a very multicultural area, with 55.3% of residents born overseas, including a high population of Filipinos.

== History ==
Following European settlement of Australia in 1788, attempts were made to integrate Aboriginal Australians into the European culture. As significant land grants had been made around Prospect, a "Native Institute" – which came to be known as "Black's Town" – was built early in the 1820s around the Plumpton area, at the intersection of Rooty Hill Road and Richmond Road. The School for Aboriginal Children was relocated to this institution in 1823; however by 1833 it had been abandoned.

In the short time it existed, "Black's Town" stamped its name on the road from Prospect to the institution. The railway station was named for the road and the settlement around Blacktown railway station and the whole district became known as Blacktown.

Walter Lamb (1825–1906) established a cannery, fruit preserving works and a coursing (greyhound racing) track on his property Woodstock. The area was initially known as Woodstock, but when a post office was established in 1889, there was confusion over this Woodstock and a railway station on the Blayney-Harden line, also called Woodstock. Coursing in England was conducted at Plumpton, so that name replaced Woodstock.

=== Heritage-listed buildings ===
- Plumpton House

== Geography ==
Located on the Cumberland Plain, Plumpton is a generally flat suburb and is rectangular in shape, bordered by Jersey Road to the north, the Westlink M7 motorway to the east, Woodstock Avenue to the south and Pringle Road to the west. The suburb is primarily residential, with a small commercial area based on the Plumpton Marketplace shopping complex on the northern edge of the suburb.

Plumpton Park is a large recreational and conservation reserve in the centre of the suburb featuring remnant Cumberland Plain open woodland and a constructed wetland based on a stormwater retention basin.

== Demographics ==
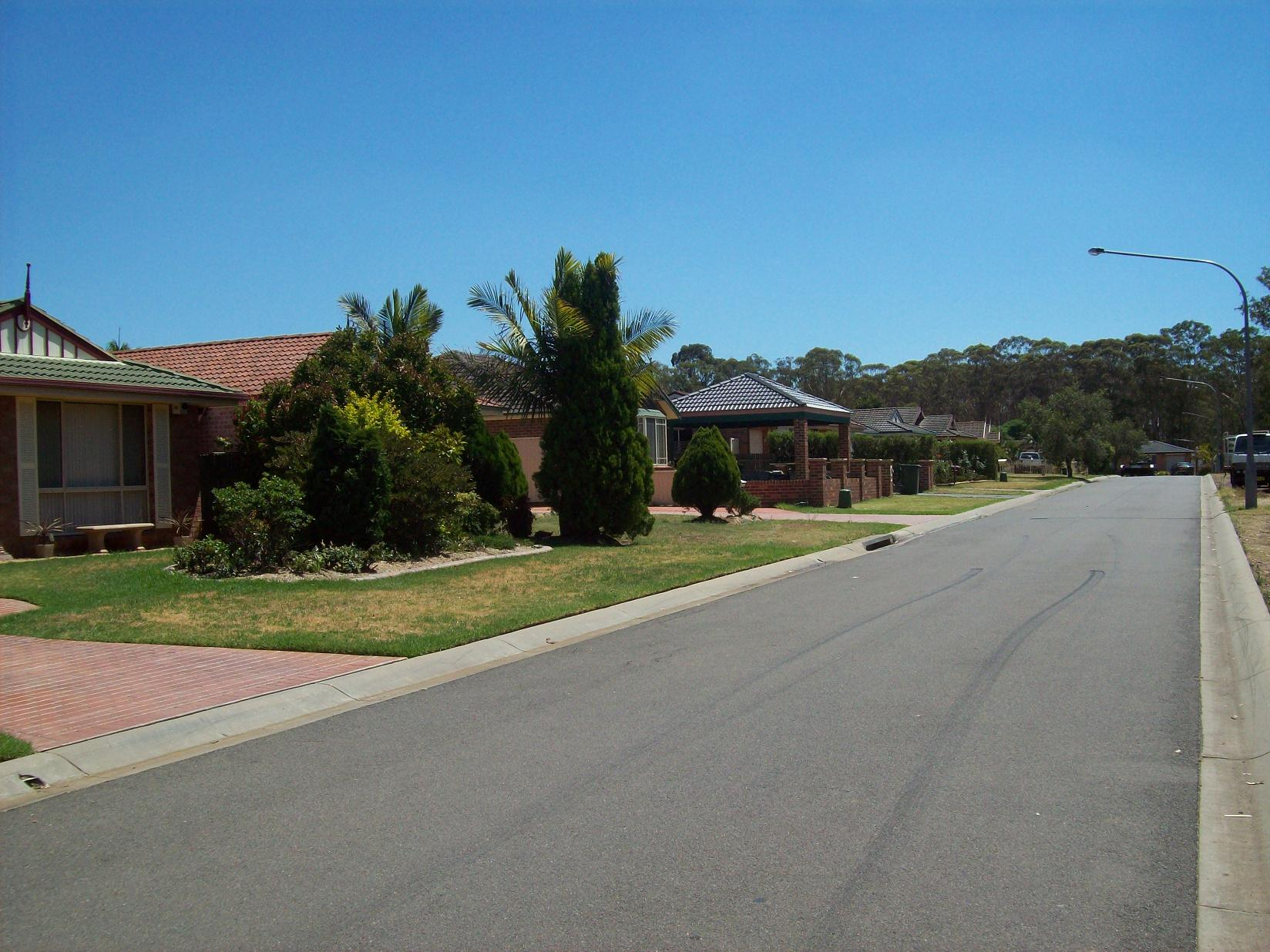
Residential streetscape in Plumpton

At the 2021 census, there were 10,070 persons usually resident in Plumpton. Couples with dependent children make up 61.7% of the population. 22.5% were children under the age of 15, higher than the national average, while people over 65 were 10.1% of the population. The median age is 34 years, four years younger than the national median age.

Plumpton is a multicultural area, with 55.3% of residents born overseas. The most common foreign birthplaces were the Philippines (16.3%), Fiji (5.6%), Pakistan (4.4%), India (4.3%) and New Zealand (2.3%). 1.7% of inhabitants were reported as being of indigenous origin. The most common responses for religious affiliation in Plumpton were Catholicism (32.6%), Islam (17.8%), No Religion (10.5%), Hinduism (9.1%) and Anglican (5.2%).

The occupations of the population were professionals (18.3%), clerical and administrative workers (16.0%), machinery operators and drivers (14.8%), labourers (11.8%) and community and personal service workers (10.9%). 5.7% of the labour force in Plumpton were unemployed, slightly higher than average, while the average household income was slightly higher ($2,171) than the rest of the country.

82.2% of occupied dwellings in Plumpton were fully detached houses, with most of the remainder consisting of attached houses such as townhouses and duplexes (16.8%). There were only 22 apartments (0.8%). The median rent was $430 per week (compared with $375 for all of Australia) and nearly three-quarters of houses were owner-occupied (70.6%).

== Commercial area ==
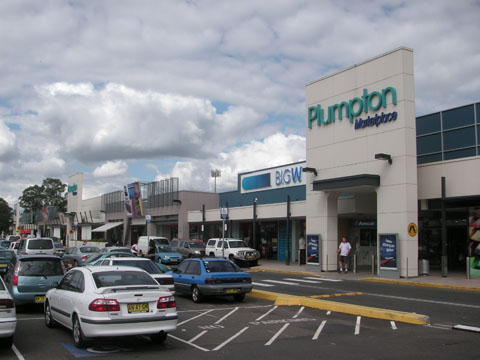
Plumpton Marketplace

HomeCo Plumpton Marketplace is a shopping centre, which is home to a Woolworths supermarket, a Big W discount department store, a medical clinic, banking, fashion, fast food and other retail outlets.

The empty land adjacent to the current Plumpton Marketplace is due to the developed into another shopping centre, Plumpton Central.

Plumpton is located close to the suburb of Mount Druitt which provides many of the services not available in Plumpton.

== Facilities ==
=== Schools ===
Plumpton Public School is a primary school. It was established in 1875 as Rooty Hill Public School, which enrolled 40 students. In 1890 the school moved into a now heritage-listed building at 327 Rooty Hill Road North, and was renamed Woodstock, after Woodstock Cannery. The building is described as "a typical small brick school building built to a style used commonly during the late 19th century". Geologist and Antarctic explorer Douglas Mawson attended the school in the 1890s. It was the first school to educate Aboriginal and European students in the same classroom. The school was renamed Plumpton Public School in 1907, and in 1990 moved to a new building on Bottles Road.

The old primary school building was renamed Plumpton House when the school moved in 1990, and now houses a special needs school for 5-12-year-olds, called Plumpton House School.

Plumpton High School is located at 141 Hyatts Road.

Good Shepherd Primary School is a Catholic school located in Plumpton. It is part of the Catholic Schools Parramatta Diocese network system of 80 Catholic schools in the region.

=== Transport ===
Plumpton is readily accessed from the Westlink M7 motorway, which forms the eastern boundary of the suburb. The suburb is also a short distance north of the M4 motorway.

Busways provides regular bus services to St Marys, Mount Druitt, Rouse Hill and Blacktown railway stations.

=== Fire brigade ===
The Plumpton Rural Fire Brigade, which has its roots in the 1940s or possibly earlier, serves not only Plumpton, but many surrounding suburbs and the greater Blacktown City local government area. Its current building, located in Florence Street, was officially opened by then Mayor of Blacktown City Council John Aquilina (later NSW MP) on 18 July 1981.

== Notable residents ==
- Steven McRae – principal dancer, Royal Ballet London; grew up in Plumpton
- Douglas Mawson (1882–1958) – geologist and Antarctic explorer; lived in Plumpton for some time as a child, attending Plumpton Primary School
- Mathew Ryan – goalkeeper and captain of Australia national soccer team; born and grew up in Plumpton
