= HMAS Nirimba =

- Nirimba Fields, Sydney, New South Wales in Australia

Site information
- Type: Naval base
- Operator: Royal Australian Navy

Location
- Coordinates: 33°43′30″S 150°52′35″E

Site history
- Fate: Decommissioned; Nirimba Education Precinct

HMAS Nirimba is a former Royal Australian Navy (RAN) training base located at the former RAAF Station Schofields at Nirimba Fields, previously Schofields, in Sydney, New South Wales, Australia.

== History ==
Nirimba is a Darug word meaning pelican.

Schofields aerodrome was evaluated for use as the site of the RAN Aircraft Repair Yard, following the formation of the Royal Australian Navy Fleet Air Arm in November 1950. The RAN moved in and Schofields was temporarily commissioned as HMAS Albatross II, RANARY Schofields with a contingent of Royal Navy officers and sailors supplementing the RAN Component. In January 1952, the Royal Australian Air Force transferred control of the base to the RAN, but remained in residence until September 1952.

On 1 April 1953, the Royal Australian Naval Air Repair Yard Schofields was commissioned as HMAS Nirimba, a joint RANARY and technical training establishment for RAN Fleet Air Arm. The Aircraft Repair Yard was short lived however, and was closed down in early 1955 and HMAS Nirimba and the airfield were reduced to "Care and Maintenance" status.

In September 1955, preparations began to recommission HMAS Nirimba as the RAN Apprentice Training Establishment (RANATE) for Naval Apprentice training. The establishment reopened in January 1956, Captain F L George RAN assumed command. On 4 January 1956, HMAS Nirimba was paid off to recommission the next day as HMAS Nirimba, RAN Apprentice Training Establishment. Nirimba was finally decommissioned on 25 February 1994, having trained some 13,000 young men and women from the RAN and other Commonwealth navies.

The site has since been redeveloped as the Nirimba Education precinct and houses facilities for the Western Sydney University, the Western Sydney Institute, Wyndham College and the St John Paul II Catholic College. In November 2020, the portion of Schofields that houses the precinct became the new suburb of Nirimba Fields.

The site was also the scene of dress rehearsals for the 2000 Olympic Games opening ceremony.

== See also ==
- List of former Royal Australian Navy bases
