= Oakhurst, New South Wales =

Oakhurst
- Suburb
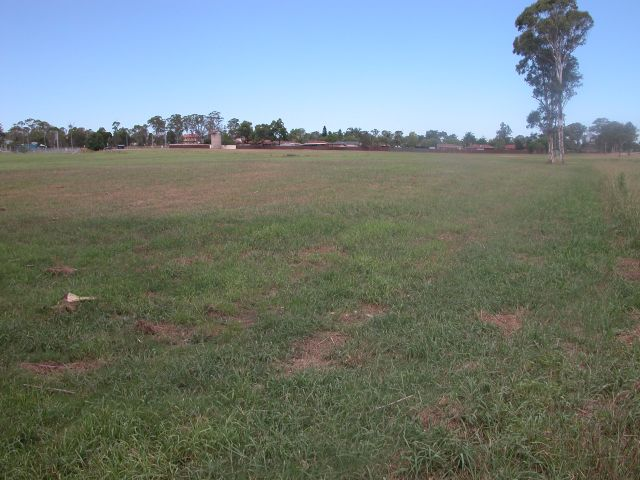
- Blacktown Native Institution Site, now mostly a vacant lot.

- Interactive map of Oakhurst
- Country: Australia
- State: New South Wales
- City: Sydney
- LGA: City of Blacktown
- Location: 46 km (29 mi) west of Sydney CBD

Government
  - State electorate: Mount Druitt
  - Federal division: Chifley
- Elevation: 47 m (154 ft)

Population
  - Total: 6,947 (2021 census)
- Postcode: 2761
Suburbs around Oakhurst
Hassall Grove	Marsden Park	Colebee
Bidwill	Oakhurst	Dean Park
Hebersham	Plumpton	Glendenning

Oakhurst is a suburb of Sydney, in the state of New South Wales, Australia 46 kilometres west of the Sydney central business district, in the local government area of the City of Blacktown. It is part of the Greater Western Sydney region.

== History ==
The land currently occupied by the present-day suburb of Oakhurst was originally zoned as rural, with poultry and vegetable farms existing well in the mid-20th century. In 1981, the land was zoned as residential by the NSW State Government. Shortly after, the Land Commission of NSW (Landcom) began developing land bounded by Jersey Rd to the south, Daniels Rd to the west, Cook Rd to the north and Rooty Hill Rd North to the east. Landcom named the development, at this point still officially recognised as Plumpton, "The Oaks Estate", in honour of a historical residence retained by Landcom on Hyatts Road. Landcom constructed an Exhibition Village at Bancroft Street and Darkon Place, where prospective buyers could view a selection of homes prior to purchase and construction. An Information Centre was located at the entrance of the Village, and both were featured in an official Landcom television advertisement starring Australian television personalities Julie McGregor and Dave Gibson.

The majority of "The Oaks Estate" had been completed by 1985, and the NSW Geographical Name Board moved quickly to officially name the suburb "Hassall", in honour of Reverend Thomas Hassall who established Western Sydney's first Sunday School. However, the name was a source of contention amongst local residents, who cited ridicule and irrelevance to the area as justification for a name change. It was assumed the official suburb name would be reflective of Landcom's estate name, "The Oaks", and in their first act as a community, residents successfully lobbied the Board to have the name changed to "Oakhurst". Residents to the west of Daniels Rd who were also part of Landcom's Oaks Estate, were left disappointed when their section of the development was incorporated into Hebersham, a neighbouring public housing community, rather than Oakhurst.

== Transport and housing ==
By 1991, construction of a new estate to the north of Oakhurst, known as Hassall Grove, had commenced. However, developers and the community alike agreed that Cook Rd was insufficient to handle the increased traffic volume another suburb would bring. As such, Luxford Road was extended in a south-easterly direction and joined with an upgraded portion of Cook Road to become the area's new thoroughfare. Developers agreed the new road would form a more suitable boundary between Oakhurst and the new development.

Consequently, the small portion of houses that had already been constructed, or were in the process of construction, along Southee Circuit, Bancroft Street, Westcott Place, Ophelia Place, Rotuma Street, Appletree Grove and Dimascio Place, were officially severed from Hassall Grove and absorbed into Oakhurst. Major portions of Cook Rd that were not utilised in the Luxford Rd extension, were either closed to traffic, or rejuvenated with lawns and children's play equipment.

== Commercial area ==
Oakhurst's local shopping centre is Plumpton Marketplace, home to major retailers and corporations including Woolworths, BigW, the Commonwealth Bank and Flight Centre. Hassall Grove Plaza, on the other hand, provides residents with a local green grocer, bakery, hair salons and take-away shops.

== Education and sport ==
Richard Johnson Anglican School is Oakhurst's flagship school, serving students from Kindergarten to Year 12.

Oakhurst shares a local soccer team with Plumpton, the Plumpton/Oakhurst Soccer Club inc., whose home ground is located at Hanna Reserve, Hyatts Road. The team is a part of the Blacktown & Districts Soccer Football Association incorporated, which hosts annual competitions that involve teams from surrounding suburbs and districts, with players of varying age groups.

== Heritage listings ==
Oakhurst has a number of heritage-listed sites, including:

- Richmond Road: Blacktown Native Institution Site
