= Tallawong metro station =

Sydney Metro railway station

Tallawong
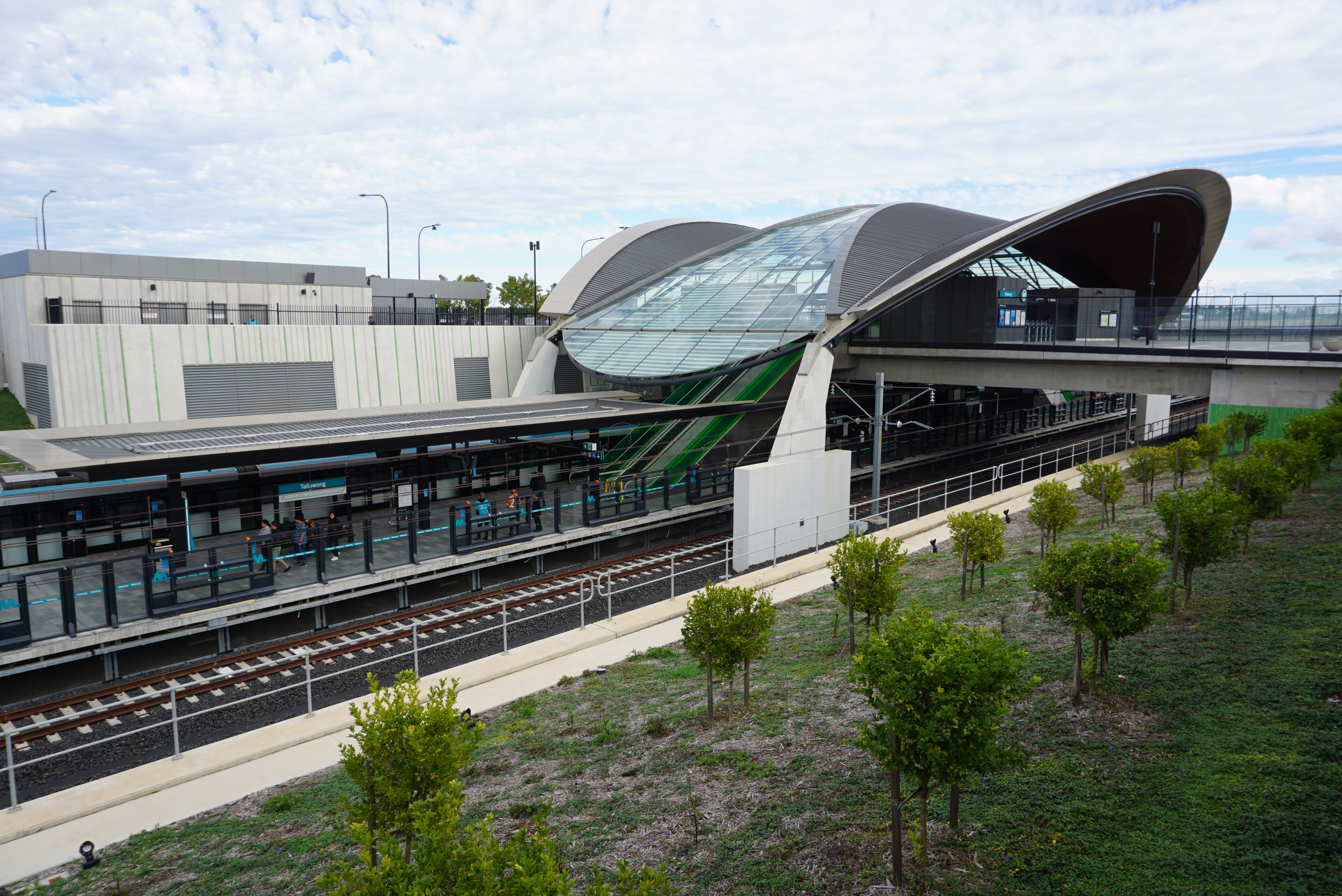
- Station viewed from the Western bridge in July 2019

General information
- Location: Cudgegong Road, Tallawong, New South Wales, Australia
- Coordinates: 33°41′30″S 150°54′20″E
- Owner: New South Wales Government
- Operator: Metro Trains Sydney
- Line: Metro Northwest
- Distance: 35 km (22 mi) from Chatswood
- Platforms: 2 (1 island)
- Tracks: 3
- Connections: Bus

Construction
- Structure type: Open cut
- Depth: 6 m (20 ft) below street level

History
- Opened: 26 May 2019 (7 years ago)
- Former names: Cudgegong Road (during construction)

Passengers
- 2023: 2,379,330 (year); 6,519 (daily) (Sydney Metro)

Services
Preceding station	Sydney Metro	Following station
Terminus	M1 Metro North West & Bankstown Line	Rouse Hill towards Bankstown
Location

Tallawong metro station is a rapid transit railway station and the terminus of the Metro Northwest line, serving the Sydney suburb of Tallawong. It is served by Sydney Metro M1 Metro North West & Bankstown Line services. Beyond the station to the west lies the Tallawong depot, where metro rolling stock is stabled.

== History ==
Though various forms of a rail line to Rouse Hill were proposed by the NSW Government between 1998 and 2010, these generally terminated at Rouse Hill Town Centre. A 2001 plan had the line continue north-west rather than west from Rouse Hill, with the next stop at Box Hill. Tallawong only emerged as a station location in 2012, with the government favouring a future corridor heading west from Rouse Hill towards the existing Schofields railway station and the future growth area of Marsden Park.

The station opened on 26 May 2019 and is operated by Metro Trains Sydney, who are also responsible for the design of the station.

As of 2018, it was proposed to extend the line to Schofields station heading west from Tallawong, where it would connect with a proposed "North-South Link" towards Western Sydney Airport and Macarthur.

=== Name ===
The station was originally named Cudgegong Road during construction, after a nearby road, which in turn was named for a central west NSW property owned by the suburb's namesake, local pastoralist and political figure Richard Rouse. It could not be named Rouse Hill as this name is used for a separate station to the east at Rouse Hill Town Centre.

Blacktown City Council unsuccessfully proposed naming the surrounding area and station in honour of former Prime Minister Gough Whitlam. In December 2017, the Geographical Names Board of New South Wales launched a consultation to rename the station Tallawong. The renaming was confirmed in April 2018. Tallawong is a Darug word meaning apple gum tree. In November 2020, the portion of Rouse Hill in which the station was located became part of the new suburb of Tallawong, named after the station.

== Design ==
The station was designed by Australian architectural firm Hassell. Its facilities include 1,000 parking spaces and a bicycle shed with 45 spaces.

== Services ==
=== Platforms ===
Tallawong has one island platform with two faces. It is served by M1 Metro North West & Bankstown Line services. Two bus stops are located adjacent to the station. The "Tallawong Station, Implexa Pde" stop is serviced by two Busways services to Marsden Park and two to Blacktown. The "Implexa Pde opp Tallawong Station" stop is serviced by four Busways services to Rouse Hill.

Platform	Line	Stopping pattern	Notes
2 & 3	M1 Metro North West & Bankstown Line	Terminating services to & from Bankstown	

== Trackplan ==
External image
- Tallawong Bus Guide by Transport for NSW

== Gallery ==
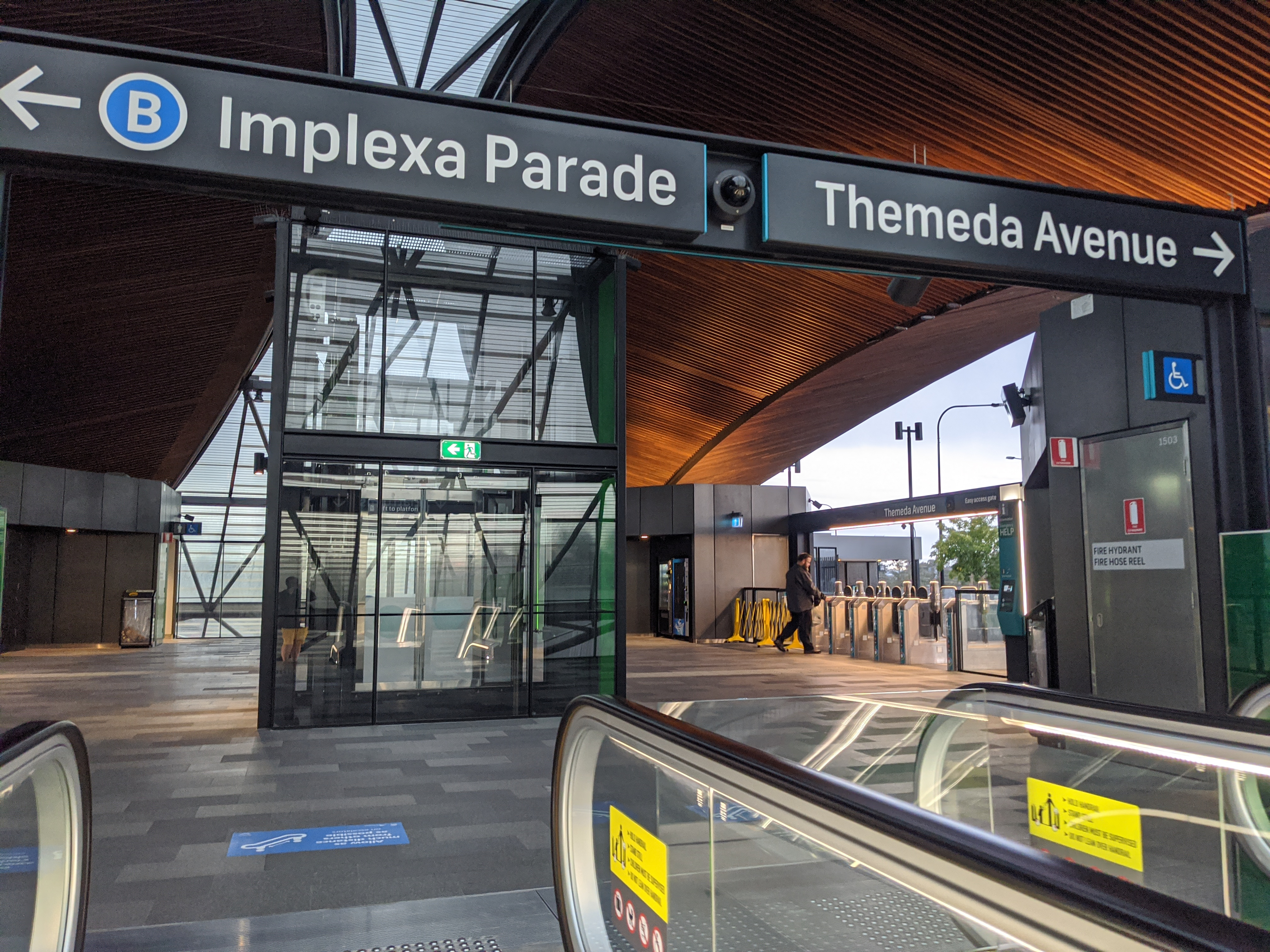
Concourse in July 2020

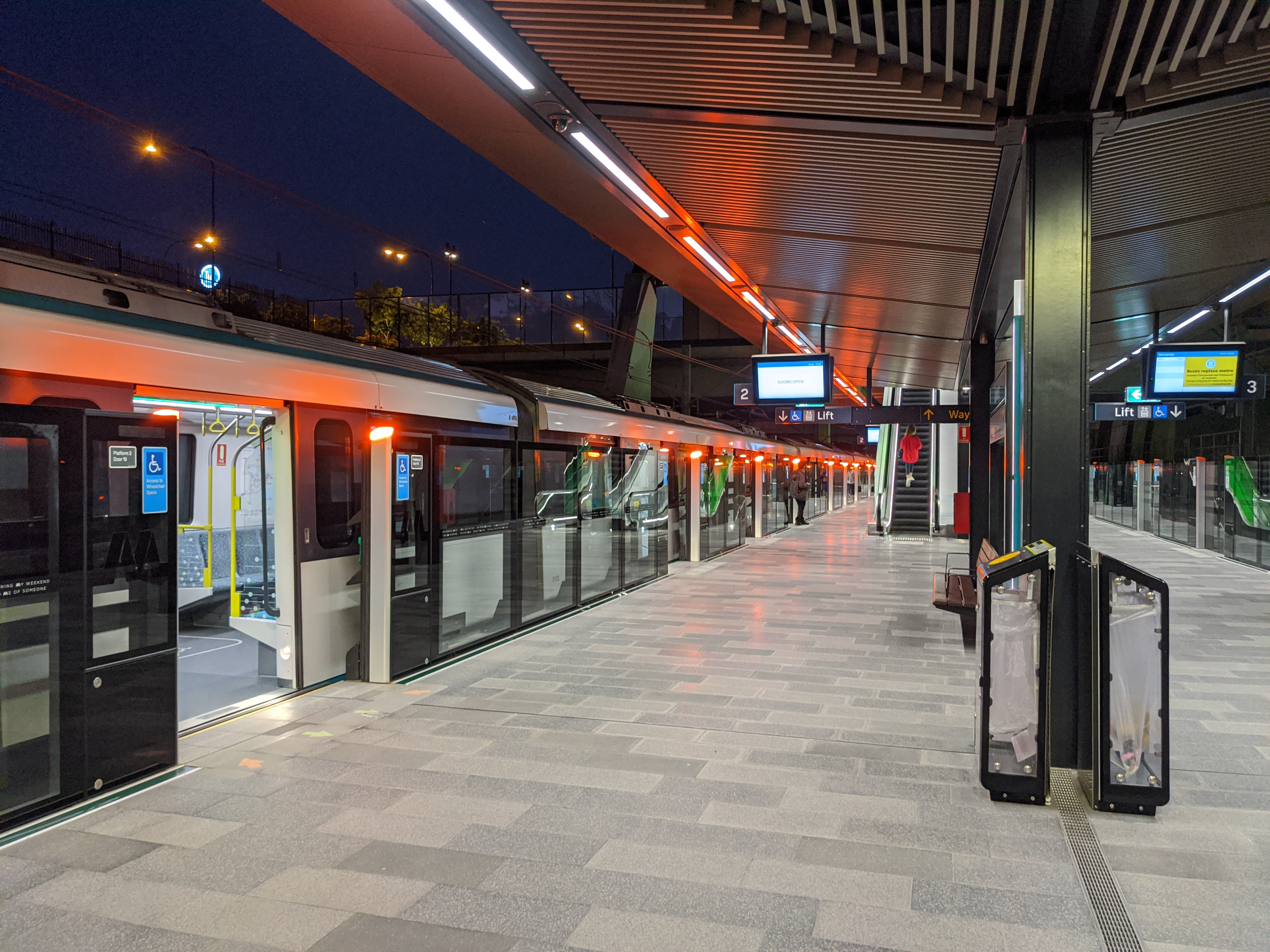
Platforms in May 2020

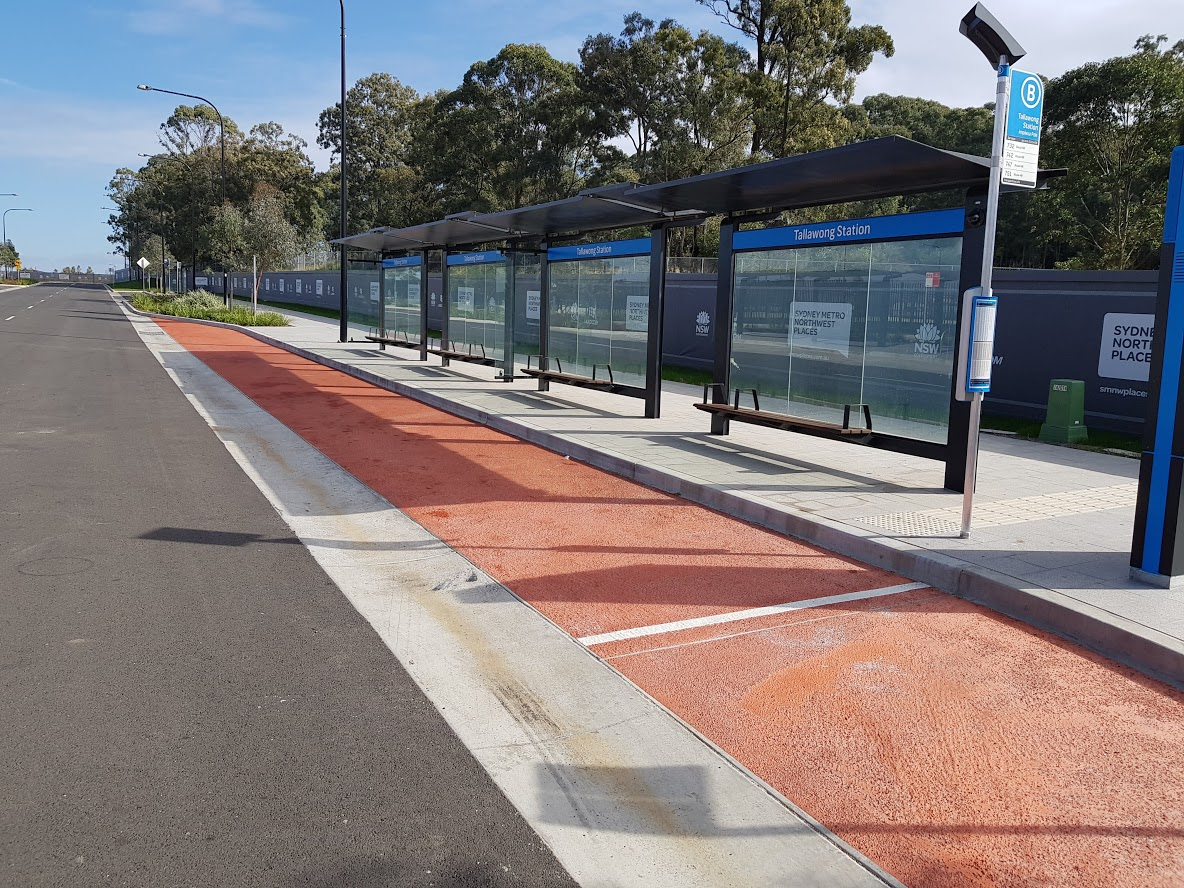
Connecting bus stands in June 2019
