= Dean Park, New South Wales =

Dean Park
- Suburb
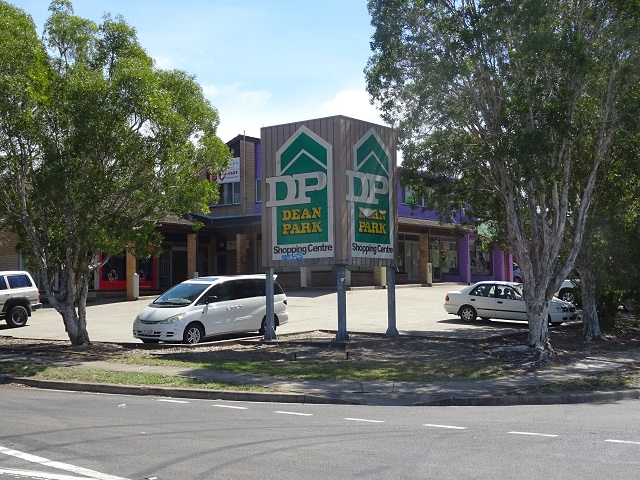
- Dean Park Shopping Centre

- Interactive map of Dean Park
- Country: Australia
- State: New South Wales
- City: Sydney
- LGA: City of Blacktown
- Location: 43 km (27 mi) west of Sydney CBD

Government
  - State electorate: Mount Druitt
  - Federal division: Chifley

Population
  - Total: 3,180 (2021 census)
- Postcode: 2761
Suburbs around Dean Park
Marsden Park	Colebee	Nirimba Fields
Hassall Grove	Dean Park	Quakers Hill
Oakhurst	Glendenning	Doonside

Dean Park is a suburb of Sydney, in the state of New South Wales, Australia. Dean Park is located 43 kilometres west of the Sydney central business district, in the local government area of the City of Blacktown and is part of the Western Sydney region.

== History ==
Dean Park takes its name from the Dean family. William 'Lumpy' Dean (1776–1854) received two grants of land of 100 and 50 acres in 1817, and later a third one of 50 acres, beside Eastern Creek. His family owned the Bush Inn on the Western Highway. Dean Park is home to William Dean Public School named in honour of the Convict originally granted the land.

The suburb was originally planned and developed in the early 1980s. Some of the street names are aboriginal in origin such as Yarramundi Drive. It is said that other street names take on the names of the original site developers, the Hoyle brothers (Nathan, Kenneth and Wayne).

== Transport ==
Dean Park is serviced by busways routes 754 and 751

== Population ==
At the 2021 census, there were 3,180 residents in Dean Park. 55.5% of people were born in Australia. The most common countries of birth were Philippines 8.5% and India 6.0%. 54.6% of people spoke only English at home. Other languages spoken at home included Tagalog 5.4%, Arabic 4.7% and Punjabi 3.7%. The most common responses for religion were Catholic 31.1%, No Religion 21.0% and Anglican 7.7%. Of occupied private dwellings in Dean Park, 95.4% were separate houses.

== Notable residents ==
Notable former residents of Dean Park include:

- Former Guantanamo Bay inmate Mamdouh Habib.
- National Rugby League Grand Final champion Luke Swain.
