= Wyndham College =

Location
- Nirimba Education Precinct, Eastern Road, Nirimba Fields 2763, New South Wales; Australia

Information
- Type: Government, public co-educational day school
- Motto: Working Together to Widen Horizons
- Denomination: Non denominational
- Established: 1999
- Principal: Kristine MacPhail
- Staff: 71 staff
- Grades: Years 11 & 12 (Senior Secondary School)
- Enrolment: 800-900 students (approx.)
- Colours: Blue, gold and red
- Website: Wyndham College

Wyndham College is a public senior secondary school located at Nirimba Fields, New South Wales, Australia.

Established in 1999, its intake of students comes from three surrounding high schools: Quakers Hill High School, Riverstone High School, and Seven Hills High School. With Wyndham College, they make the Nirimba Collegiate Group of Schools. The Collegiate Group of Schools all operate independently of each other, but the four principals work closely together.

The college is situated on the Nirimba Education Precinct, co-located within: the University of Western Sydney, Blacktown, Western Sydney Institute of TAFE – Nirimba College, and St John Paul II Catholic College, Senior Campus.

Wyndham College Logo prior to change in 2022.

Visual artworks completed by students from the college are regularly nominated and featured in Art Express.

== Tradewynds Café ==
Wyndham College hosts a café which is run by both school staff and students. Students working at the Tradewynds Café are a part of the school's hospitality faculty. The café operates from 7:30am until 1:30pm on Mondays to Thursdays (NSW school term days only), serving breakfast and lunch to both the school community and general public. The cafe hosts an indoor seating area, outdoor deck, car park, function centre and commercial kitchen which provides hospitality students with a practical learning area. Tradewynds Café is a non-profit business and all proceeds and funds are given to Wyndham College to supplement student learning programs.

== History ==
Wyndham College was named after the previous NSW Director General of Education, Harold Wyndham, who assisted in implementing the Higher School Certificate (HSC) for Year 12 students and the School Certificate for Year 10 students. Wyndham College is built on the former site of the naval training base HMAS Nirimba, and the campus derives its name "Nirimba Education Precinct" from this historical connection.

== Sports ==
- Rugby league, Indoor Soccer, Ultimate Frisbee, Swimming, Athletics, Golf, Cross Country Netball

== Notable alumni ==
=== Sport ===
- Andrew Fifita – Rugby League Player:
- Kenrick Monk – Swimming: 2007 World Aquatics Championships, Beijing 2008 Summer Olympics and the 2010 Commonwealth Games.

== See also ==
- List of Government schools in New South Wales
