= Kings Park, New South Wales =

Kings Park
- Suburb
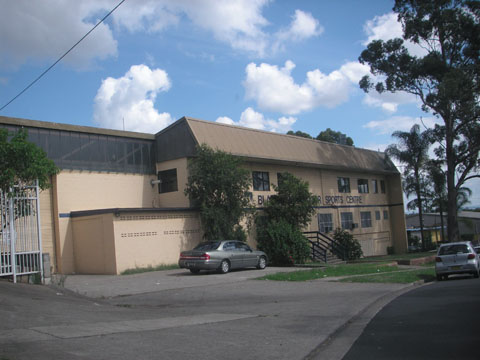
- Blacktown Indoor Sports Centre, Kings Park

- Interactive map of Kings Park
- Country: Australia
- State: New South Wales
- City: Sydney
- LGA: City of Blacktown
- Location: 40 km (25 mi) west of Sydney CBD
- Established: 1987

Government
  - State electorate: Blacktown
  - Federal division: Greenway
- Elevation: 63 m (207 ft)

Population
  - Total: 3,476 (2021 census)
- Postcode: 2148
Suburbs around Kings Park
Quakers Hill	Acacia Gardens	Glenwood
Marayong	Kings Park	Kings Langley
Woodcroft	Blacktown	Lalor Park

Kings Park is a suburb of Sydney, in the state of New South Wales, Australia. Kings Park is located 40 km west of the Sydney central business district, in the local government area of the City of Blacktown and part of the Greater Western Sydney region.

== Description ==
Kings Park is bounded by the Richmond railway line to the west, the Westlink M7 to the north, Sunnyholt Road to the east and Breakfast Creek to the south. The southern half of the suburb is industrial while the northern half is newer residential homes. There are no schools or shopping centres within Kings Park with these facilities found in the neighbouring suburbs of Marayong, Blacktown and Kings Langley. The major landmarks are St Andrews church, and Blacktown Indoor Sports centre near Marayong railway station and Faulkland Crescent Reserve in the northern part of the suburb.

The suburb has three Christian church denominations represented, Catholic, Brethren and Pentecostal. A Hindu Temple is also in the suburb, while a Sikh temple is located nearby.

== History ==
Kings Park was originally part of Marayong, but with increased residential development, residents wanted a separate identity, and the developer's estate name was adopted in 1987.

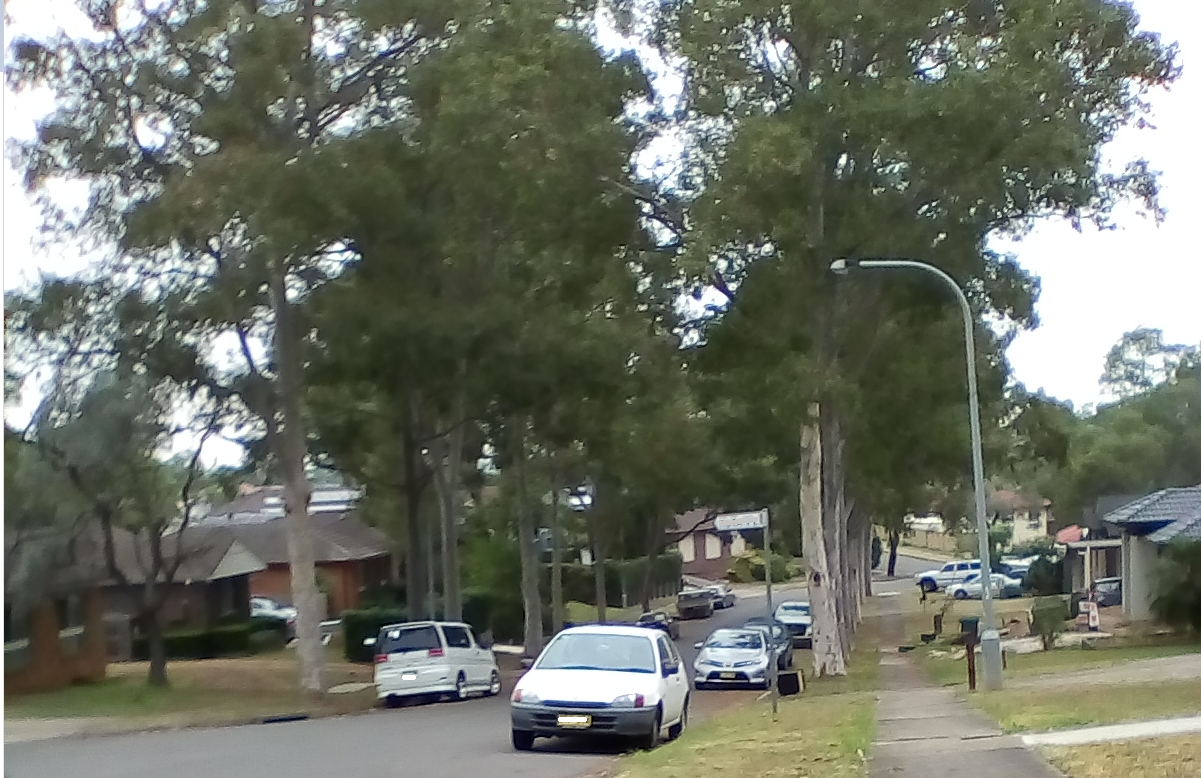
Street scene in Kings Park, New South Wales

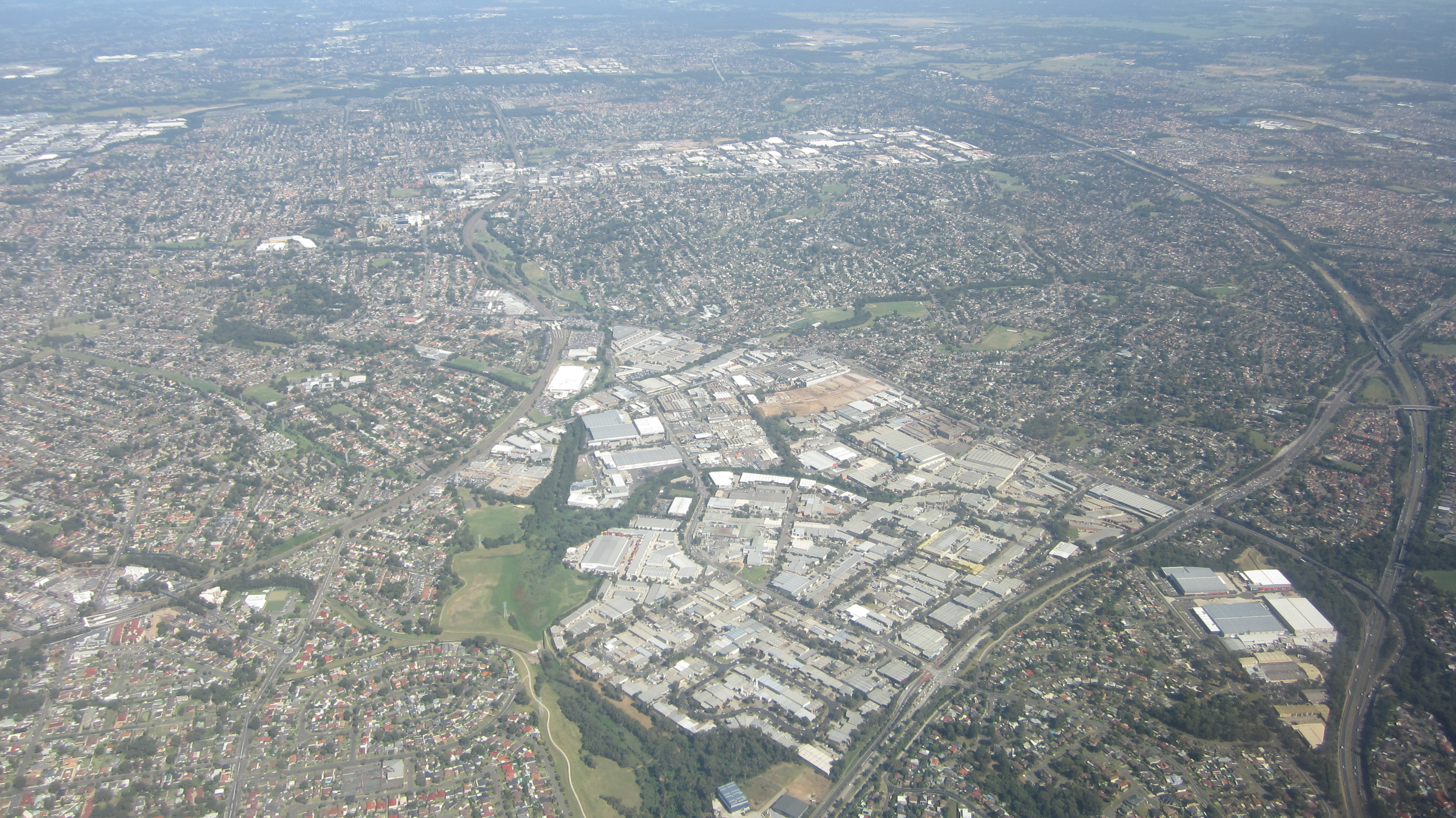
Kings Park area

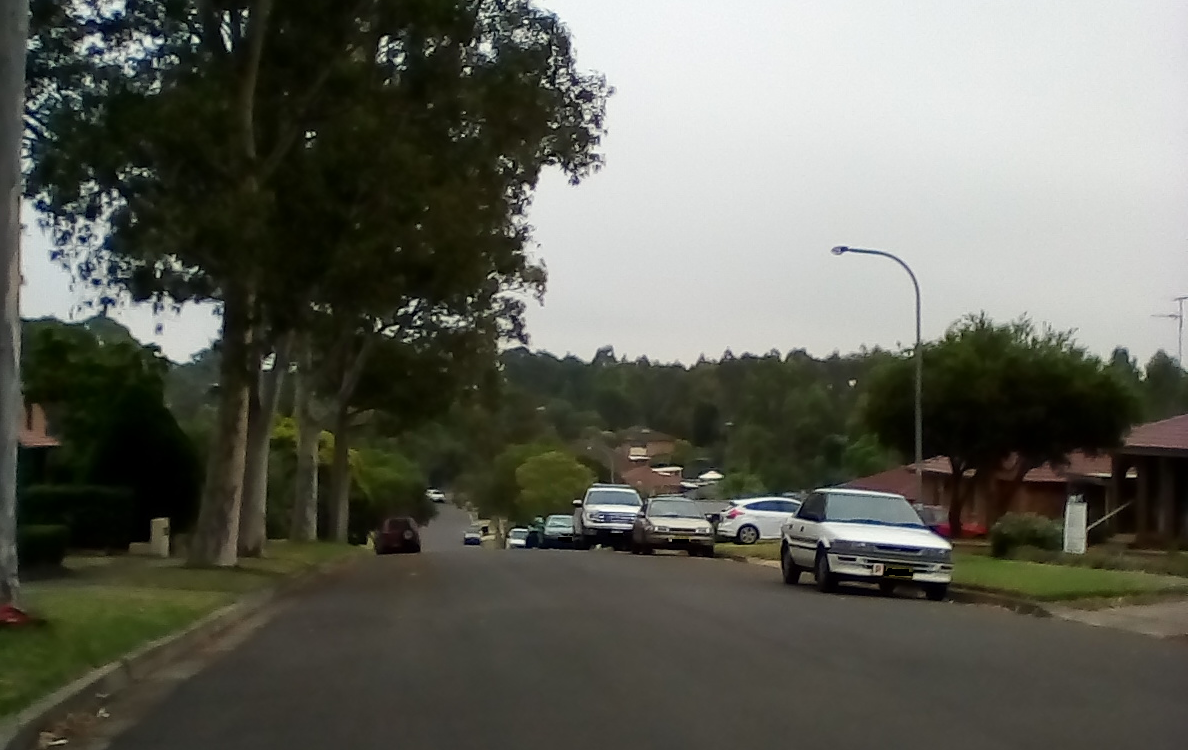
Kings Park looking west with Westlink M7 reserve to the right behind trees

== Population ==
In the 2021 Census, there were 3,476 people in Kings Park. 67.9% of people were born in Australia. The next most common countries of birth were India 5.4%, Philippines 2.9%, England 2.6%, New Zealand 2.3% and China 1.4%. 70.9% of people spoke only English at home. The most common responses for religion were Catholic 28.8%, No Religion 28.7% and Anglican 11.7%.

== Transport ==
The suburb is served by Marayong railway station on the Richmond railway line and the Blacktown-Parklea branch of the North-West T-way.
