= Acacia Gardens =

- Suburb
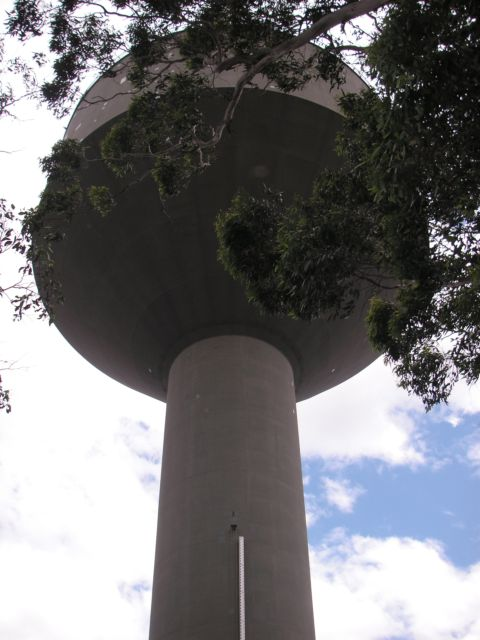
- Water tower in Acacia Gardens c. 2011

- Interactive map of Acacia Gardens
- Country: Australia
- State: New South Wales
- City: Sydney
- LGA: City of Blacktown
- Location: 30 km (19 mi) NW of Sydney CBD
- Established: 1996

Government
  - State electorate: Riverstone
  - Federal division: Greenway

Area
  - Total: 1 km^{2} (0.39 sq mi)
- Elevation: 87 m (285 ft)

Population
  - Total: 3,668 (2021 census)
  - Density: 3,700/km^{2} (10,000/sq mi)
- Postcode: 2763
Suburbs around Acacia Gardens
Quakers Hill	Parklea	Stanhope Gardens
Quakers Hill	Acacia Gardens	Glenwood
Marayong	Kings Park	Kings Langley

Acacia Gardens is a suburb of Sydney, in the state of New South Wales, Australia, 40 kilometres north-west of the Sydney central business district, in the local government area of the City of Blacktown. Acacia Gardens is part of the Greater Western Sydney region.

== History ==
Acacia Gardens was formerly a part of Quakers Hill. The name was chosen to reflect the rural quality of the suburb, with acacia trees being prevalent in the area. Many of the streets in the suburb are named after flowers. It was formally recognised as a suburb in 1996.

== Demographics ==
According to the 2021 census of the population, there were 3,668 residents in Acacia Gardens. 54.1% of people were born in Australia. The next most common countries of birth were India 16.7% and the Philippines 4.2%. 51.5% of people only spoke English at home. Other languages spoken at home included Punjabi 8.1%, Hindi 5.7% and Tagalog 2.9%. The most common responses for religious affiliation were Catholic 25.2%, No Religion 18.6%, Hinduism 15.4%, Anglican 8.4% and Sikhism 7.4%.

== Education ==
=== Acacia Gardens ===
Quakers Hill East Public School is the only school in Acacia Gardens. The school is a primary school that was founded on 1 January 1959 on Lalor Road (Quakers Hill). In 2002, the school was moved to its current location, as of 2025, at Chase Drive (Acacia Gardens).

=== Nearby suburbs ===
In nearby suburbs, there are other public primary schools:

==== Public ====
- Barnier Public School (Quakers Hill)
- Hambledon Public School (Quakers Hill)
- Quakers Hill Public School (Quakers Hill)

==== Private (Catholic) ====
- Mary Immaculate (Quakers Hill)
- St John XXIII Primary (Stanhope Gardens)

There are also several High schools in nearby suburbs:

==== Public ====
- Glenwood High School (Glenwood)
- Quakers Hill High School (Quakers Hill)
- Wyndham College (Nirimba Fields)

==== Private (Catholic) ====
- St. John Paul II Catholic College (Schofields - years 7-10 and Nirimba Fields - years 11–12)
- St Mark's Catholic College (Wattle Grove)

== Transport ==
Busways provides regular services to Blacktown, Castle Hill, Rouse Hill, Plumpton, St Marys and Macquarie Centre. The closest railway stations are located at Quakers Hill and Blacktown. CDC NSW provides services to Parramatta and Sydney CBD from neighbouring Stanhope Gardens.

The suburb is served by Wilson station on the North-West T-way.
