= Marayong =

- Suburb
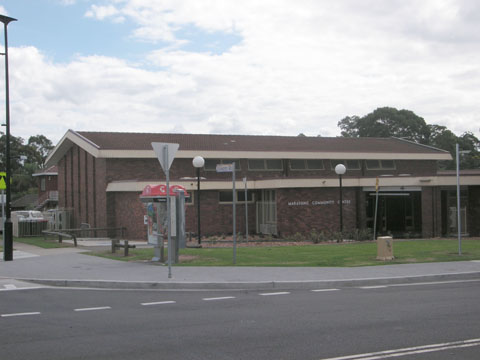
- Marayong Community Centre

- Interactive map of Marayong
- Country: Australia
- State: New South Wales
- City: Sydney
- LGA: City of Blacktown
- Location: 32 km (20 mi) WNW of Sydney CBD
- Established: 1926

Government
  - State electorate: Blacktown
  - Federal division: Chifley
- Elevation: 41 m (135 ft)

Population
  - Total: 7,834 (2021 census)
- Postcode: 2148
Suburbs around Marayong
Quakers Hill	Quakers Hill	Acacia Gardens
Parklea	Marayong	Kings Park
Kings Langley	Woodcroft	Blacktown

Marayong is an urban residential suburb of Sydney, in the state of New South Wales, Australia. Marayong is located approximately 32 kilometres north west of the Sydney central business district, in the local government area of the City of Blacktown and is part of the Greater Western Sydney region.

== History ==
The name 'Marayong' is derived from the Dharug language word 'Mariyung', which means emu or place of cranes. The name was first given by the New South Wales Railways to the railway station when it opened in October 1922.

Around 1900–1905, large areas were subdivided and market gardens and poultry farms were established. The area was part of Quakers Hill but in 1926 the Marayong Progress Association applied to have Marayong made a suburb, in its own right.

The area was mostly rural until the 1960s. Housing Commission (public housing) estates, opened in the 1960s, marked the urbanization of the suburb predominantly south of the railway line. In addition, an industrial area was also released north of the railway line.

== Demographics ==
The population of Marayong was 7,834 at the 2021 census. The median household income of $1,593 per week was a bit less than the national average. There were a substantial number of people born in India (14.1%) and the number of Catholics in Marayong (30.6%) was well above the national average.

Maryong is ranked 16/100 in Australia by number and severity of crimes proportionate to population indicating a "moderately safe" suburb. The majority of crimes committed are Assault and related offences cases.

== Transport ==
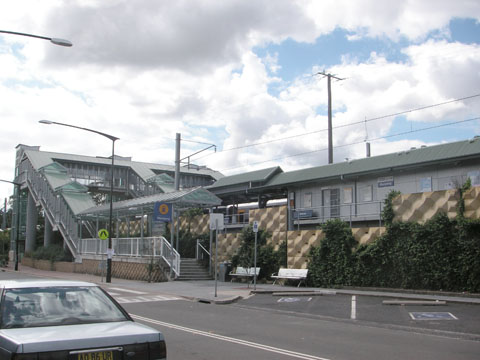
Marayong railway station

Marayong railway station is on the Richmond Line. It provides services out to Richmond and in to the city via Blacktown and Parramatta.

Years ago, Motor Rail No. 1 would run between Blacktown stopping at Marayong Station en route.

Richmond Road marks the southern boundary of the suburb and provides links to Blacktown and Richmond while the Westlink M7 curls around the suburb and can be accessed via the Sunnyholt Road intersection at Kings Park or the Richmond Road intersection at Dean Park.

== Schools ==
There are two government-run primary schools in the suburb, Marayong Public and Marayong Heights Public. There is also a Catholic primary school, St Andrews Primary and a high school St Andrews College which is divided into two campuses, the Holy Family campus on Quakers Road catering to years 7–10 and the John Paul II senior campus on Breakfast Road. The nearest government-run high schools are Quakers Hill High School, Blacktown Boys High School, Blacktown Girls High School and Doonside Technology High School.
