= Crestwood, New South Wales =

Crestwood, New South Wales may refer to:

- Crestwood, Queanbeyan
- Crestwood, Sydney
