= Parklea =

- Suburb
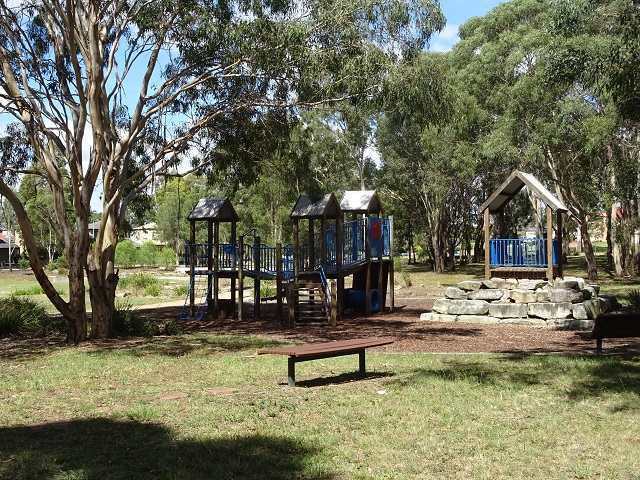
- Playground in Davison Park

- Interactive map of Parklea
- Country: Australia
- State: New South Wales
- City: Sydney
- LGA: Blacktown
- Location: 35 km (22 mi) NW of Sydney

Government
  - State electorate: Riverstone
  - Federal division: Greenway
- Elevation: 71 m (233 ft)

Population
  - Total: 3,684 (2021 census)
- Postcode: 2768
Suburbs around Parklea
Quakers Hill	Stanhope Gardens	Kellyville
Quakers Hill	Parklea	Glenwood
Quakers Hill	Acacia Gardens	Glenwood

Parklea is a suburb in Sydney, in the state of New South Wales, Australia. It is approximately 35 kilometres north-west of the Sydney central business district, in the local government area of the City of Blacktown and is a part of Greater Western Sydney. The suburb was named by the subdividers in the early 1900s and is well known for the major Sydney landmark of Parklea Markets.

== Population ==
According to the 2021 census of Population, there were 3,684 people in Parklea.

- Aboriginal and Torres Strait Islander people made up 8.3% of the population.
- 52.3% of people were born in Australia. The next most common countries of birth were India 12.8%, Philippines 3.6%, Fiji 2.6%, Sri Lanka 1.9% and New Zealand 1.8%.
- 26.5% of people spoke only English at home. Other languages spoken at home included Punjabi 6.7%, Hindi 5.6%, Tagalog 2.0%, Arabic 1.9% and Mandarin 1.5%.

== Landmarks ==
Landmarks include:

- Parklea Correctional Centre
- Parklea Markets (Sunnyholt Road)
- Parklea Garden Village (transportable home village – across the road from Parklea Markets)
- Blacktown Leisure Centre

== Transport ==
CDC NSW provides services to Parramatta, Sydney CBD and Rouse Hill, whilst Busways provides services to Macquarie Park, Castle Hill and Blacktown. The suburb is served by Sorrento and Stanhope stations on the Blacktown-Parklea T-way.

== Notable residents ==
- Doug Bollinger – Australian cricketer
