= Division of Greenway =

Australian federal electoral division

Coordinates: 33.733°S 150.913°E

Greenway Australian House of Representatives Division
- Interactive map of electorate boundaries from the 2025 federal election
- Created: 1984
- MP: Michelle Rowland
- Party: Labor
- Namesake: Francis Greenway
- Electors: 118,936 (2025)
- Area: 90 km^{2} (34.7 sq mi)
- Demographic: Outer metropolitan
Electorates around Greenway:
Macquarie	Macquarie	Berowra
Chifley	Greenway	Mitchell
Chifley	McMahon	Parramatta

The Division of Greenway is an Australian electoral division in the state of New South Wales. It is located in Sydney's west and northwestern suburbs and includes parts of the Blacktown City Council and The Hills Shire. It is currently represented by Labor MP Michelle Rowland.

Greenway is a relatively diverse electorate, with a large Indian community and smaller immigrant communities of Filipino and Sri Lankan ancestry. According to the 2016 census, only 54.5% of electors were born in Australia, while 11% were born in India.

== History ==
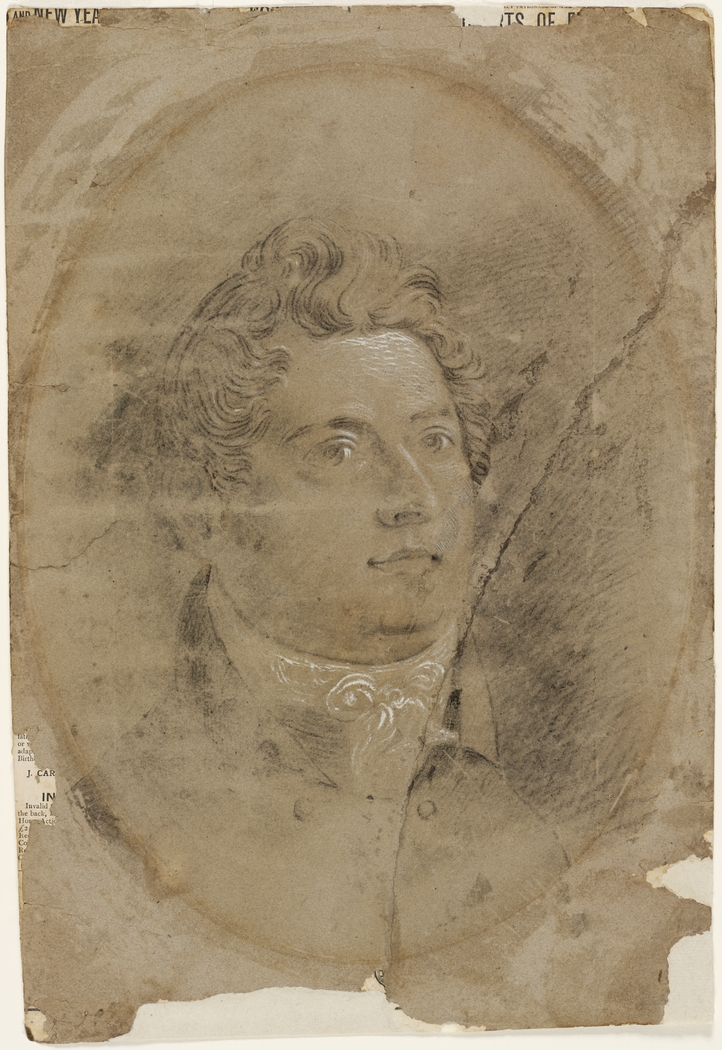
Francis Greenway, the division's namesake

The division was created in 1984 and is named for Francis Greenway, an ex-convict who became a prominent architect in colonial Sydney. For most of its history, Greenway was a safe seat for Labor. However, demographic changes in the areas north of Blacktown, specifically Kellyville Ridge, Stanhope Gardens and Glenwood, resulted in a shift away from Labor at the 2001 election. At the 2004 election this trend continued and the seat was won by the Liberal Party following the retirement of the sitting member, Frank Mossfield and an extensive Liberal campaign. Louise Markus, a Pentecostal social worker and member of Hillsong Church, defeated Ed Husic, a former political adviser and a non-practising Muslim, to take the seat by a small margin of 0.6 points. A large informal vote of 11.83%, the highest in the 2004 election, contributed to the closeness of this result, the vast majority indicating a first preference for Louise Markus.

A redistribution of the seat ahead of the 2007 federal election resulted in the Hawkesbury area towns, a strongly conservative area, moving to Greenway from the Division of Macquarie, and the loss of traditional Labor-voting areas such as Blacktown, Dean Park, Lalor Park and Seven Hills as well as the Liberal-leaning areas of Kings Langley and Seven Hills North. This boosted the notional Liberal majority to 11.7%, making it on paper a safe Liberal seat. However, at the 2007 federal election, Markus suffered a 6.9-point swing, turning Greenway into a marginal Liberal seat.

The seat was redistributed again in 2009, essentially restoring the pre-2007 boundaries and demographics. Under redistribution, most of the Hawkesbury region, including Richmond and Windsor, were shifted back to Macquarie. In return, it regained the Labor voting suburbs of Blacktown, Toongabbie, Seven Hills and Pendle Hill. Following the redistribution, the seat was notionally Labor held on a margin of 5 points. Michelle Rowland duly won the seat for Labor in 2010, and has held the seat since.

The division is a demographically diverse population that includes the working class suburbs of Blacktown, Seven Hills, Lalor Park, Schofields, Riverstone and Toongabbie which are Labor leaning, as well as the high income, Liberal leaning suburbs of Kellyville Ridge, Stanhope Gardens, Glenwood, The Ponds and Kings Langley.

== Geography ==
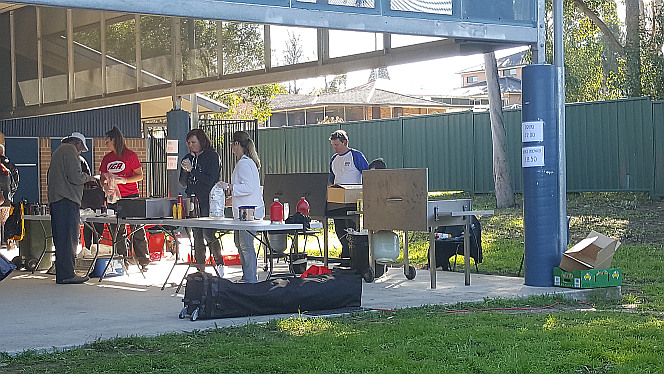
Volunteer-run sausage sizzle fundraiser at Metella Road Public School in Toongabbie at the 2016 election

Since 1984, federal electoral division boundaries in Australia have been determined at redistributions by a redistribution committee appointed by the Australian Electoral Commission. Redistributions occur for the boundaries of divisions in a particular state, and they occur every seven years, or sooner if a state's representation entitlement changes or when divisions of a state are malapportioned.

When the division was created in 1984, majority of the division was previously part of the division of Mitchell. The areas to the south at Blacktown, Seven Hills and Prospect were previously parts of the divisions of Chifley and Parramatta.

Since the division was created, it has always been located in the west and north-west suburbs of Sydney, traditionally been north and east portions of the Blacktown district. As of 2025, it also includes small portions of the Hills Shire areas. Since the 2024 redistribution, suburbs and towns include Acacia Gardens, Box Hill, Gables, Glenwood, Kellyville Ridge, Kings Langley, Kings Park, Lalor Park, Nelson, Parklea, Rouse Hill, Stanhope Gardens, and The Ponds; as well as parts of Blacktown, Quakers Hill, Riverstone, Seven Hills and Schofields.

== Members ==
Image	Member	Party	Term	Notes
	Russ Gorman (1926–2017)	Labor	1 December 1984 – 29 January 1996	Previously held the Division of Chifley. Retired. Last veteran of the Second World War to serve in the House of Representatives
	Frank Mossfield (1935–)	Labor	2 March 1996 – 31 August 2004	Retired
	Louise Markus (1958–)	Liberal	9 October 2004 – 21 August 2010	Transferred to the Division of Macquarie
	Michelle Rowland (1971–)	Labor	21 August 2010 – present	Incumbent. Currently a minister under Albanese. The longest serving Member for Greenway.

== Election results ==
2025 Australian federal election: Greenway
Party	Candidate	Votes	%	±%
Labor	Michelle Rowland	51,802	50.41	+5.63
Liberal	Rattan Virk	28,230	27.47	−6.01
Greens	Palaniappan Subramanian	11,018	10.72	+3.08
One Nation	Edwin Swann	4,700	4.57	+1.86
Independent	Robert Stuckey	2,711	2.64	+2.64
Trumpet of Patriots	Justin Mulligan	2,663	2.59	+2.59
Libertarian	Mark Rex	1,631	1.59	−1.40
Total formal votes		102,755	93.03	+0.42
Informal votes		7,700	6.97	−0.42
Turnout		110,455	92.89	+12.78
Two-party-preferred result
Labor	Michelle Rowland	65,518	63.76	+5.82
Liberal	Rattan Virk	37,237	36.24	−5.82
Labor hold		Swing	+5.82	
