= Crestwood High School (New South Wales) =

School in Baulkham Hills, Australia

Location
- 17 Chapel Lane; Baulkham Hills, New South Wales; Australia; 33.74372°S 150.97535°E

Information
- Type: Public, co-educational
- Motto: Vision and Progress
- Established: 1981
- Employees: 94 (2014)
- Grades: 7–12
- Enrolment: 1,062 (2014)
- Campus type: Suburban
- Colours: Sky blue and maroon
- Website: Crestwood High School Website

Crestwood High School is a public high school in Crestwood, Baulkham Hills, in the north-west of Sydney, Australia. Crestwood High School offers an education culminating in the award of the HSC, administered in accordance with New South Wales Education Standards Authority. Their overall state score is 90. The school offers comprehensive classes for students in grades seven through to twelve.

The school is of moderate size, counting 1,062 students and 94 employees in 2014, slightly smaller than many nearby high schools. Entry for prospective out-of-area students is increasingly competitive. In addition to the standard educational facilities, the school has a farm used for lessons in agriculture, sizeable arts and technology faculties, and a support unit which provides special education classes for persons with disabilities.

== Location ==
The school is located in the suburb of Baulkham Hills in the Hills District. Prospective students in the prescribed drawing area (including portions of Baulkham Hills, Castle Hill, and Bella Vista) are given first preference for available places. A limited number of places are generally available for students outside of this area, awarded on merit in line with DEC guidelines. Students often come from local suburbs including Kings Langley and Kellyville, but also as far as Rouse Hill and Toongabbie. Private operator Hillsbus operates school bus services to some of the aforementioned locations. Since its opening in 2019, Sydney Metro additionally improves accessibility to the high school, with Norwest railway station located a 30-minute walk from Crestwood High School.

== Academic achievements ==
A selection of the notable achievements by students at Crestwood in recent years includes:

- Two students attained an ATAR above 99 in the 2014 HSC.
- 54 mentions in the HSC Distinguished Achievers list in 2014.
- 11 mentions in the HSC Top Achievers list (top 5–20 in course), including first in NSW in Legal Studies (2008), and in Industrial Technology (2007).
- 9 mentions in the HSC All-round Achievers list, one in 2014.
- In 2015, one student progressed to the state semi final level of The Plain English Public Speaking Competition.
- One student in 2014 attained the highest score in the Australian Science Innovations Big Science Competition. This score was awarded to only 64 of 49,000 participants.
- A team of four year 11 students were placed in the top four entrants in the University of Newcastle Business Plan Challenge in 2013.

== Houses ==
Crestwood has four houses, which are prominent in sporting events such as the athletics and swimming carnival. The house with the most points at the end of the event wins. Each house has 2 captains from year 12 to represent their house in a myriad of sporting events and festivities. Each house has a mascot which represents their house. Doyle's mascot is a shark, Hendle's mascot is a crocodile, Pearce's mascot is a dragon and Ward's mascot is a bear. Each house has an additional chant which is shouted during sporting events and carnivals.

- Doyle (blue)
- Hendle (green)
- Pearce (red)
- Ward (yellow)

== Curriculum and activities ==
Crestwood offers a more diverse curriculum in years 7 through 10, before the HSC curriculum in years 11 and 12. In stage four, students rotate technology subjects each semester, with courses including textile design, food technology, metalwork and woodwork. This is in addition to language, drama, and digital literacy courses, the aim of which is to give a holistic foundation with which to approach higher study. Grade nine and ten students elect to complete two 200-hour courses over the stage, and two 100-hour courses. This gives students the ability to trial subjects that they might be interested in before selecting the subjects to take them through the HSC course.

The school operates a Gifted & Talented class for its top performing students (based on semesterly and common examinations) in stage four, and offers a streamed Gifted & Talented class in Stage five. Years 7 and 8 students work on the 'Gifted & Talented Forum Project' annually, an open dialogue for the presentation of ideas and opinion, introducing concepts of ideation and entrepreneurialism.

Crestwood students from Grades 8 through 10 have the option of participating in a weekly sporting competition against neighbouring schools, as well as entering knock-out tournaments and a variety of regional and state sporting events. Other extra-curricular activities offered at Crestwood includes dance and drama, the Duke of Edinburgh’s Award programme, barista training, a concert band, debating, peer tutoring, and a small selection of special-interest groups and clubs.

The school also maintains connections with the local community through a handful of schemes, most recently the Community Mentoring Programme. The programme connects noteworthy figures in the local community to aspiring students in year 11, providing them with support and an opportunity to share experience. Beyond this, the school hosts an annual musical, and is involved in local fundraising exercises including the Relay for Life.

== Notable alumni ==
- Jana Pittman – Olympian, represented Australia in athletics at the 2000 and 2004 Summer Olympics, and 2014 Winter Olympics (in bobsleigh); also won the gold medal for the 400m hurdles at the 2003 and 2007 world championships.
- Sophie Luck – actor, played Fly Watson in the TV series Blue Water High; also appeared in other shows such as Home and Away, all the while attending Crestwood.
- Keanu Baccus – soccer player; has played for the Western Sydney Wanderers since 2016, also represented Australia at the 2021 Olympics.
- Olivia Tauro – athlete, represented Australia at the 2010 Commonwealth Games in New Delhi, India; competed in the women’s 4 X 400m relay, finishing 4th.
- Laura Condon – water polo player, played 11 Australian National Water Polo League matches for the Sydney Uni Water Polo Club in the 2009 season.
