= Lalor Park =

- Suburb
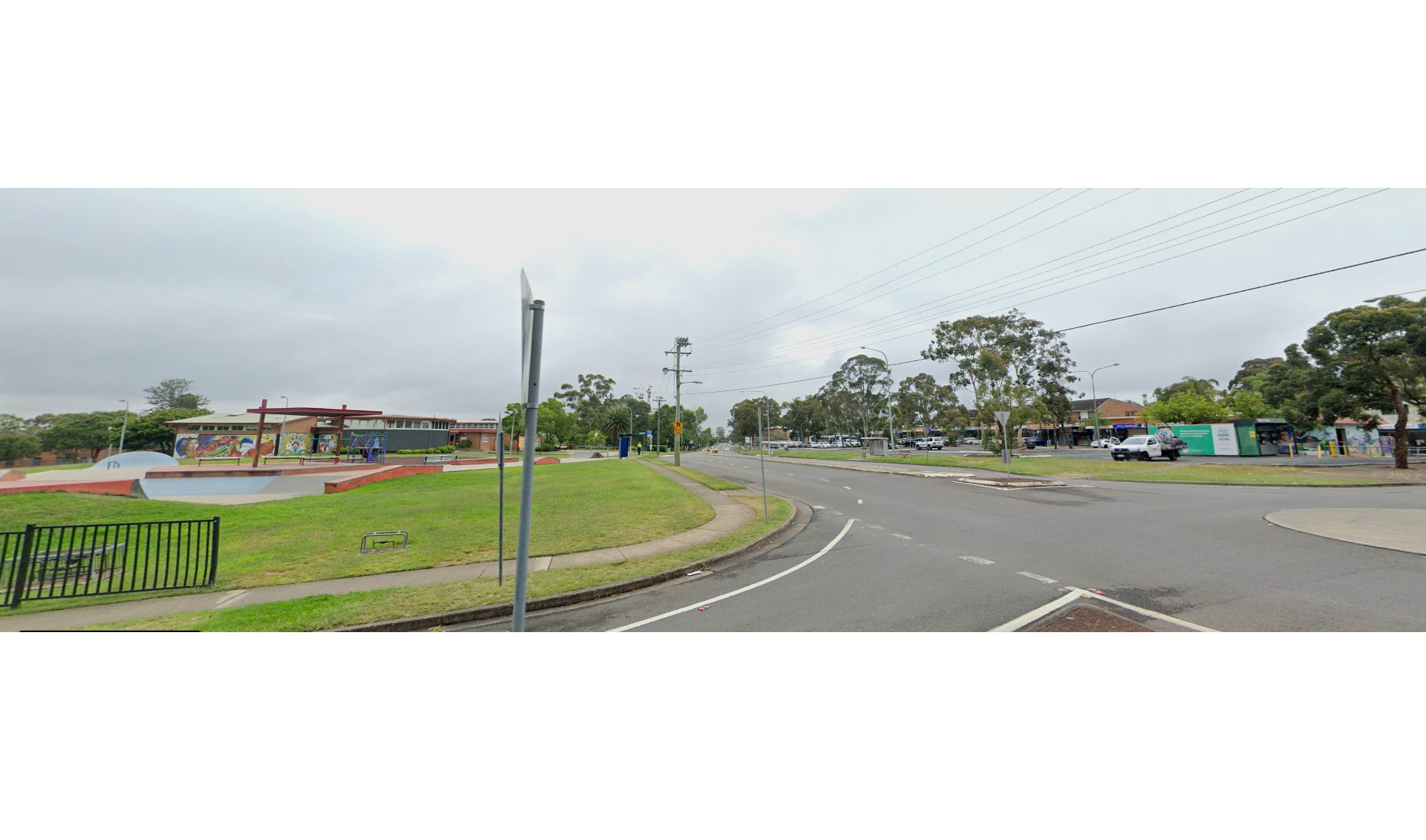
- Panorama of Lalor Park's central hub, with the community precinct on the left side of Freeman street, and the shopping district with its carpark on the right side

- Interactive map of Lalor Park
- Country: Australia
- State: New South Wales
- City: Sydney
- LGA: Blacktown
- Location: 35 km (22 mi) west of Sydney CBD

Government
  - State electorates: Winston Hills; Blacktown
  - Federal division: Greenway
- Elevation: 60 m (200 ft)

Population
  - Total: 7,834 (2021 census)
- Postcode: 2147
Suburbs around Lalor Park
Blacktown	Kings Langley	Kings Langley
Blacktown	Lalor Park	Seven Hills
Blacktown	Seven Hills	Seven Hills

Lalor Park is a suburb of Sydney, in the state of New South Wales, Australia. Lalor Park is located 35 kilometres (22 mi) west of the Sydney central business district in the local government area of the City of Blacktown. Lalor Park is part of the Greater Western Sydney region. Lalor Park is commonly abbreviated as 'L.P'.

== Population ==
According to the 2021 census of Population, there were 7,834 people in Lalor Park.

- Aboriginal and Torres Strait Islander people made up 3.8% of the population.
- 63.8% of people were born in Australia. The most common other countries of birth were India 3.9%, Philippines 3.4%, New Zealand 2.2%, England 1.5% and South Korea 1.3%.
- 64.6% of people only spoke English at home. Other languages spoken at home included Arabic 3.9%, Tagalog 2.0%, Punjabi 1.9%, Korean 1.7% and Tamil 1.5%.
- The most common responses for religion were No Religion 26.0%, Catholic 25.1% and Anglican 11.0%.

== Community Facilities ==
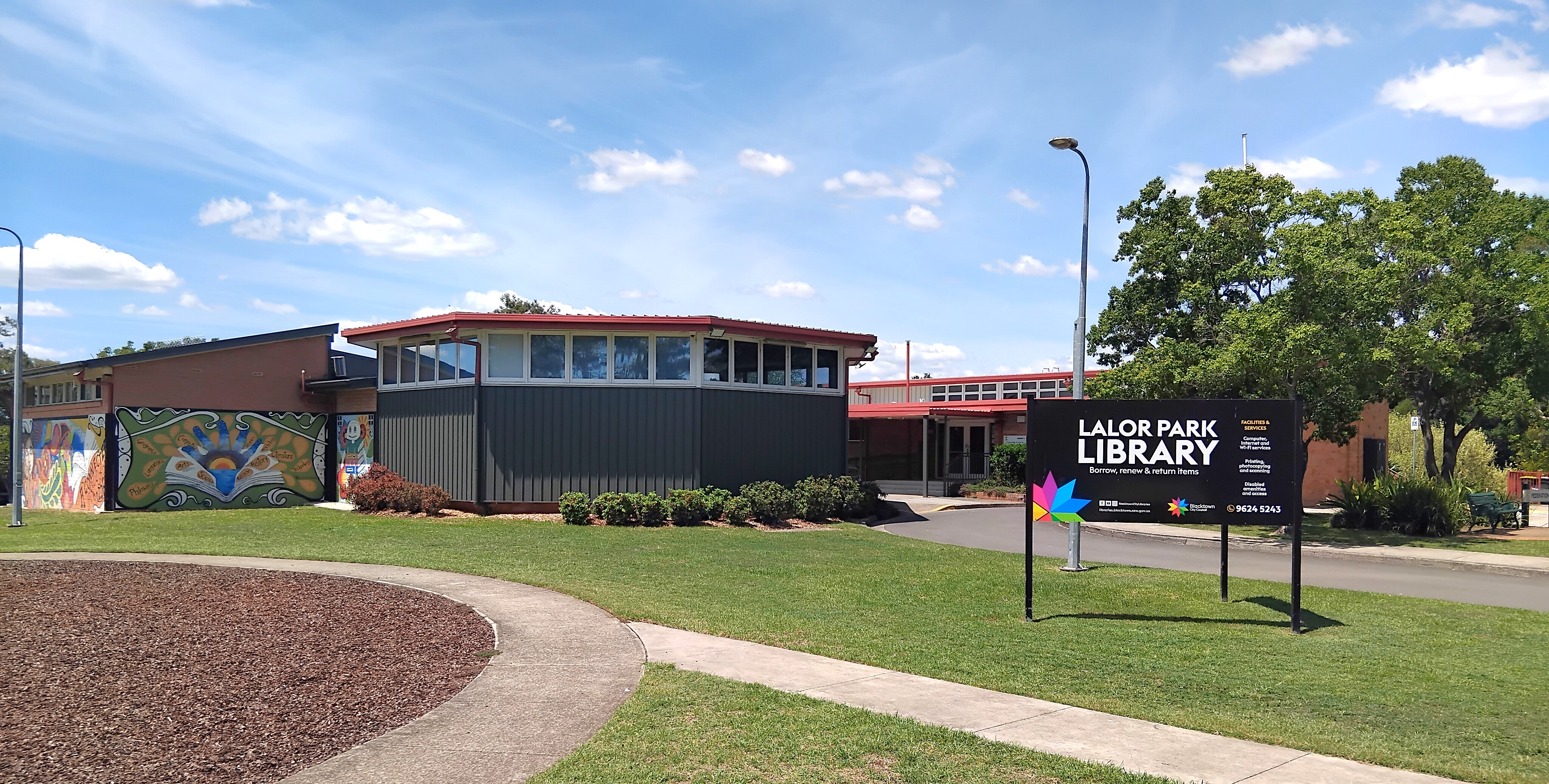
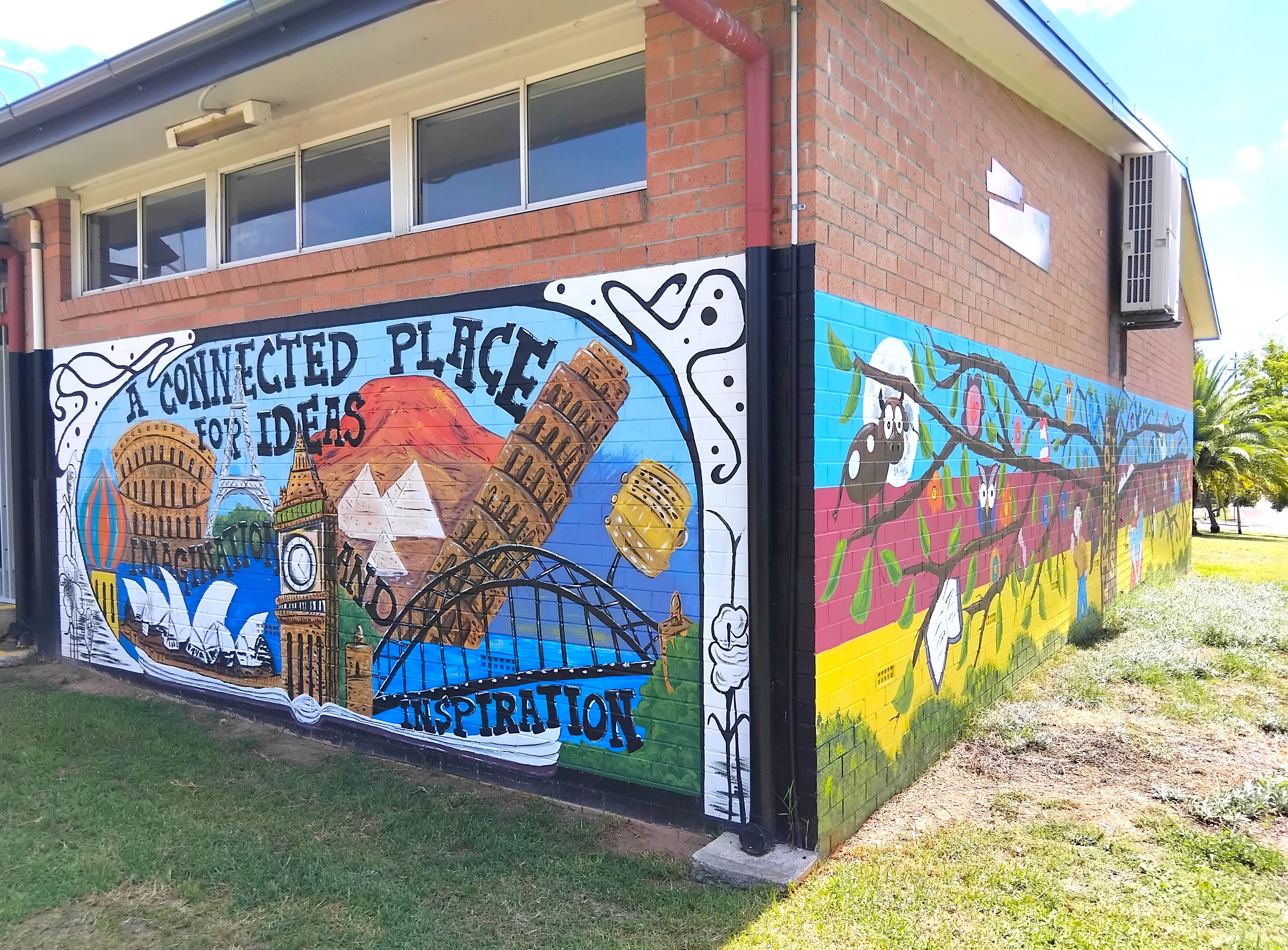
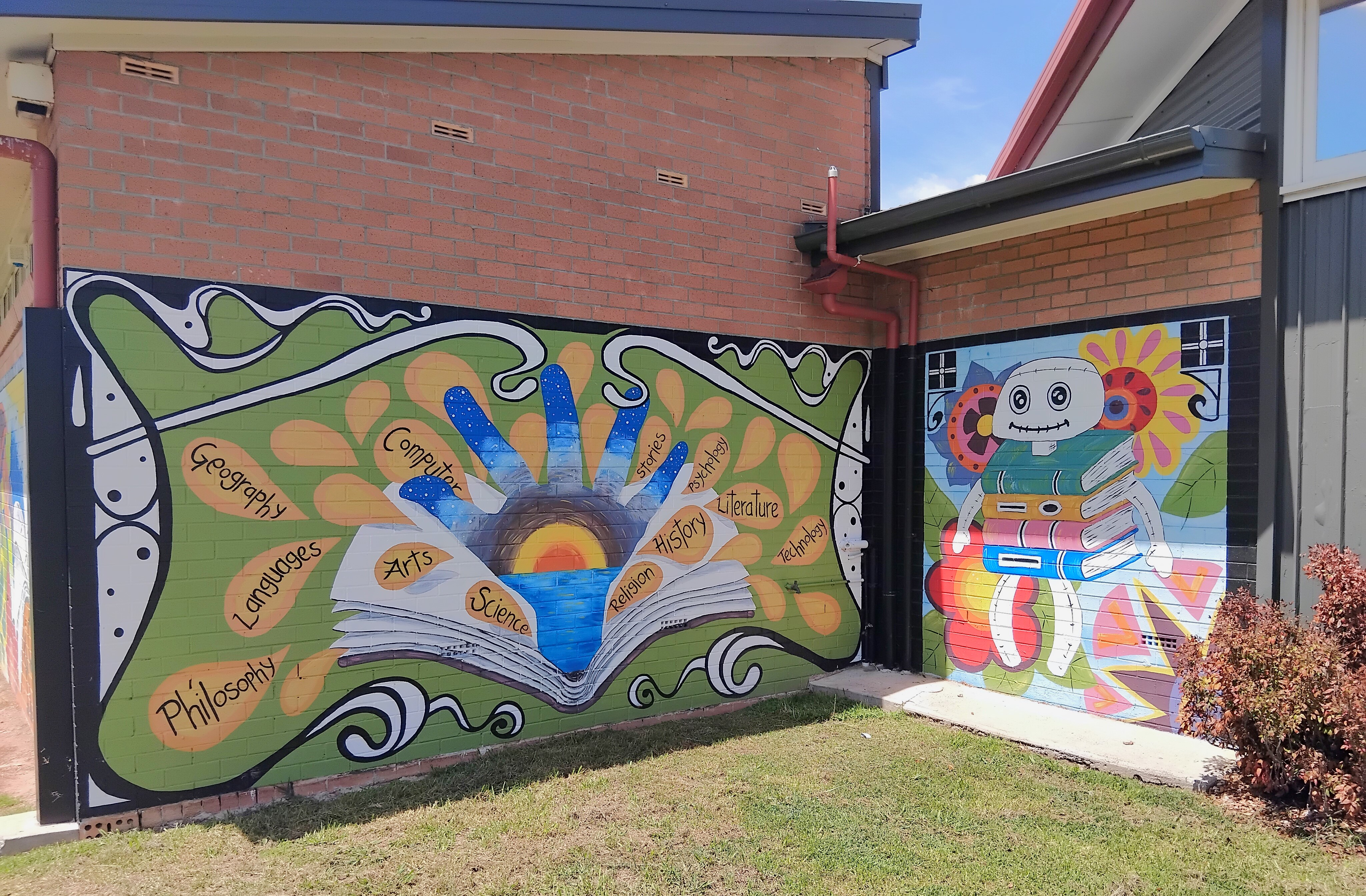
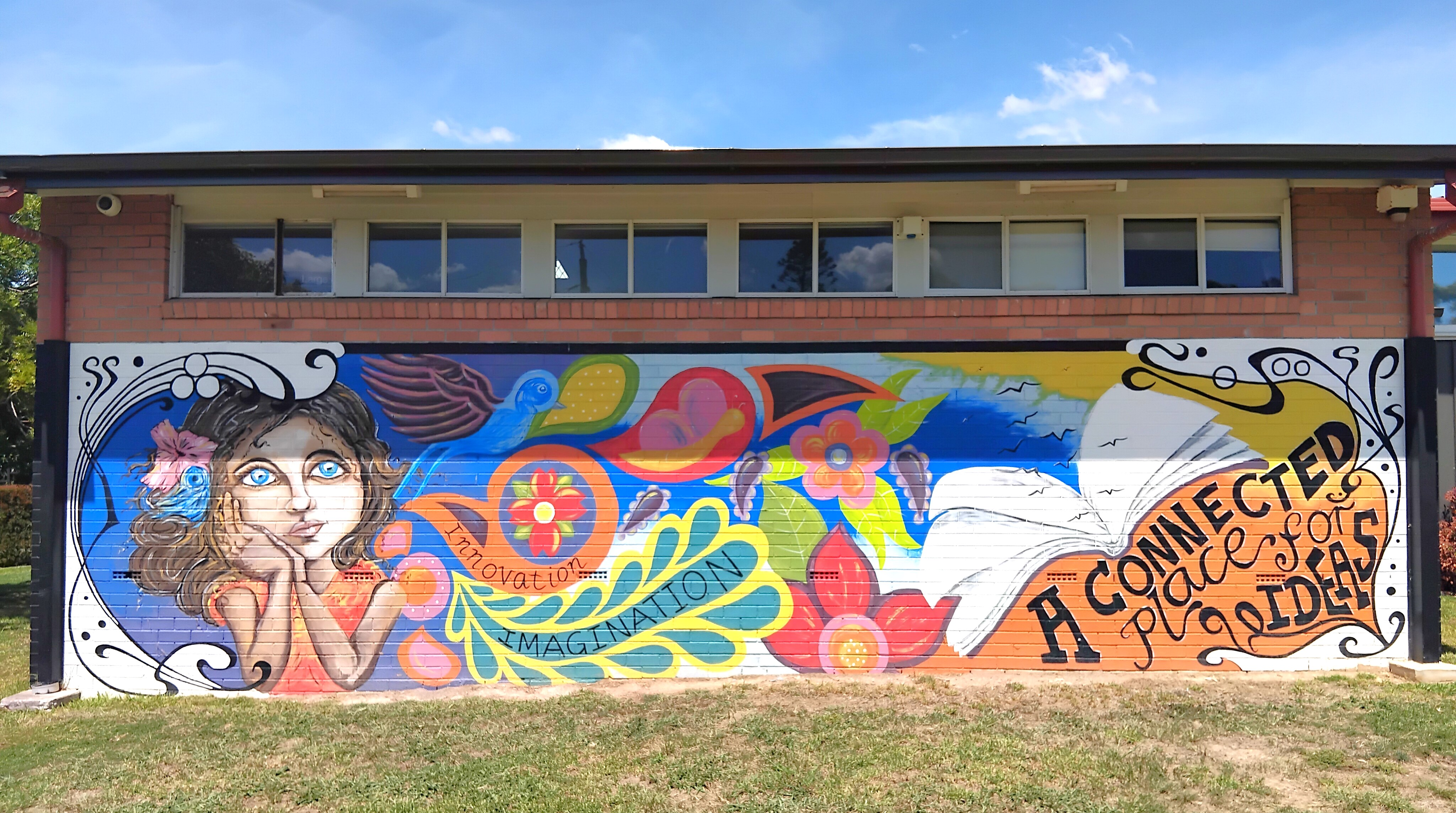
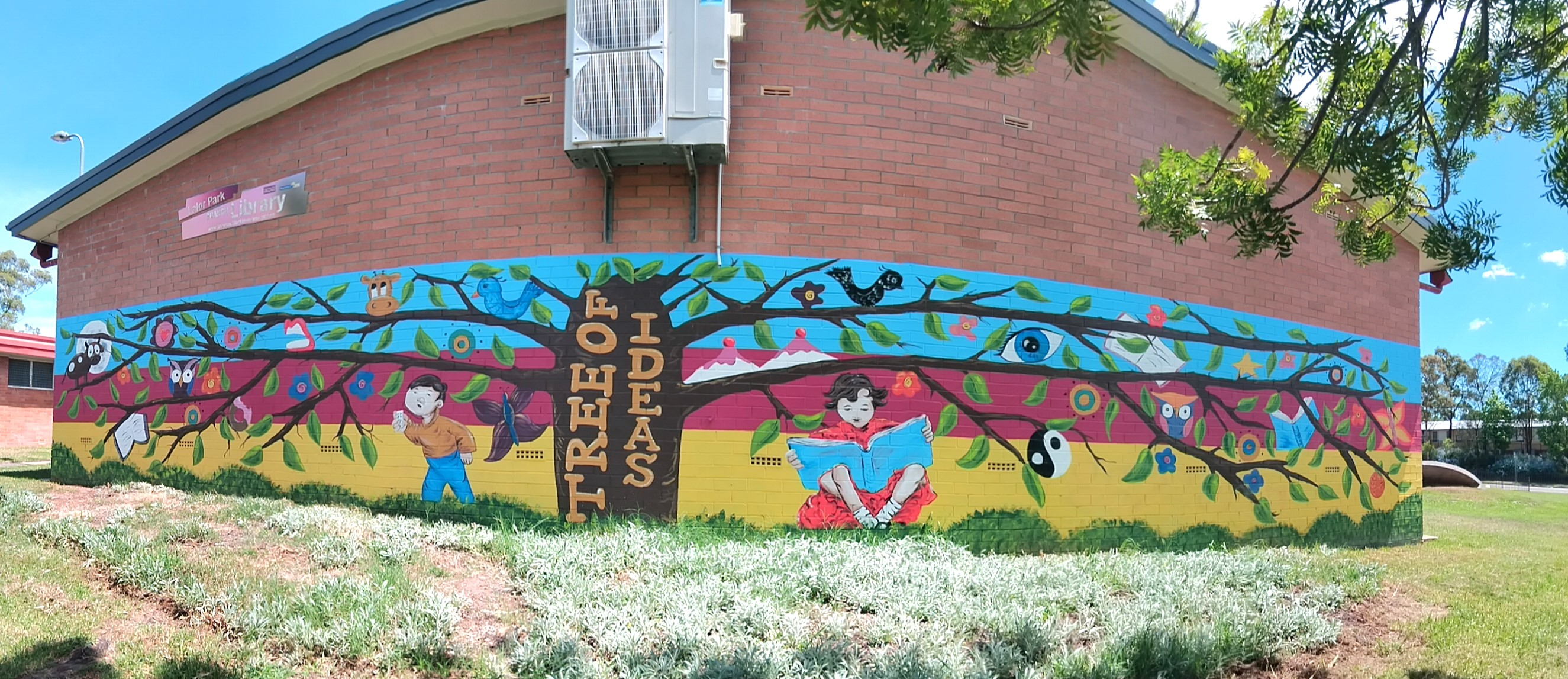
Lalor Park Library, decorated with bright, colourful murals all around its exterior, is the centerpiece of the community precinct

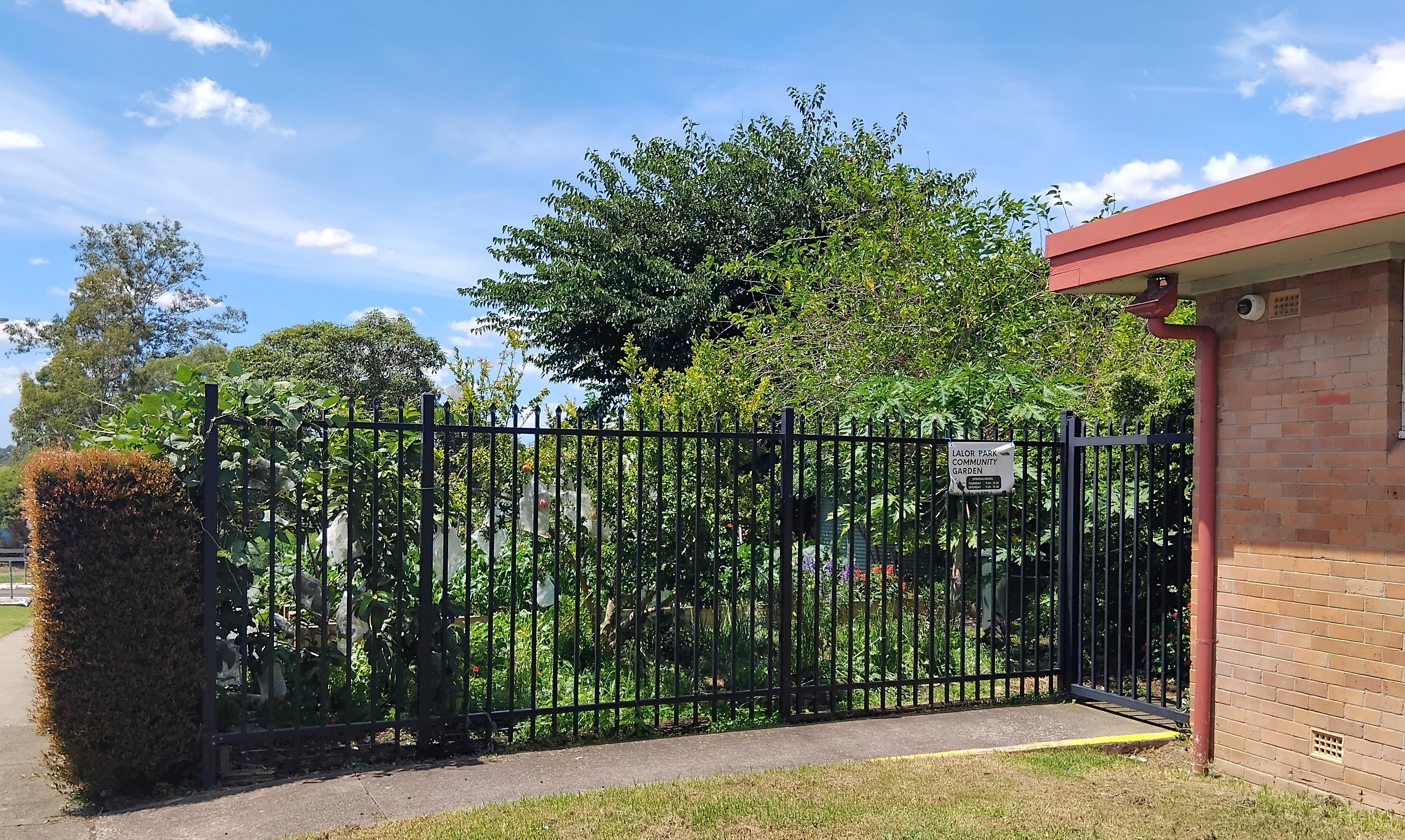
Lalor Park Community Garden, where numerous kinds of fruits, vegetables, and flowers are cultivated by volunteers

Lalor Park has a small but strong presence of community centres, which cluster around the Chiefly Reserve block along Freeman Street and include:

- Lalor Park Public Library – administered by Blacktown City Council
- Lalor Park Community Garden – an outdoor garden run by volunteers
- Lalor Skate Park – a small outdoor skatepark and neighboring playground

== Commercial areas ==
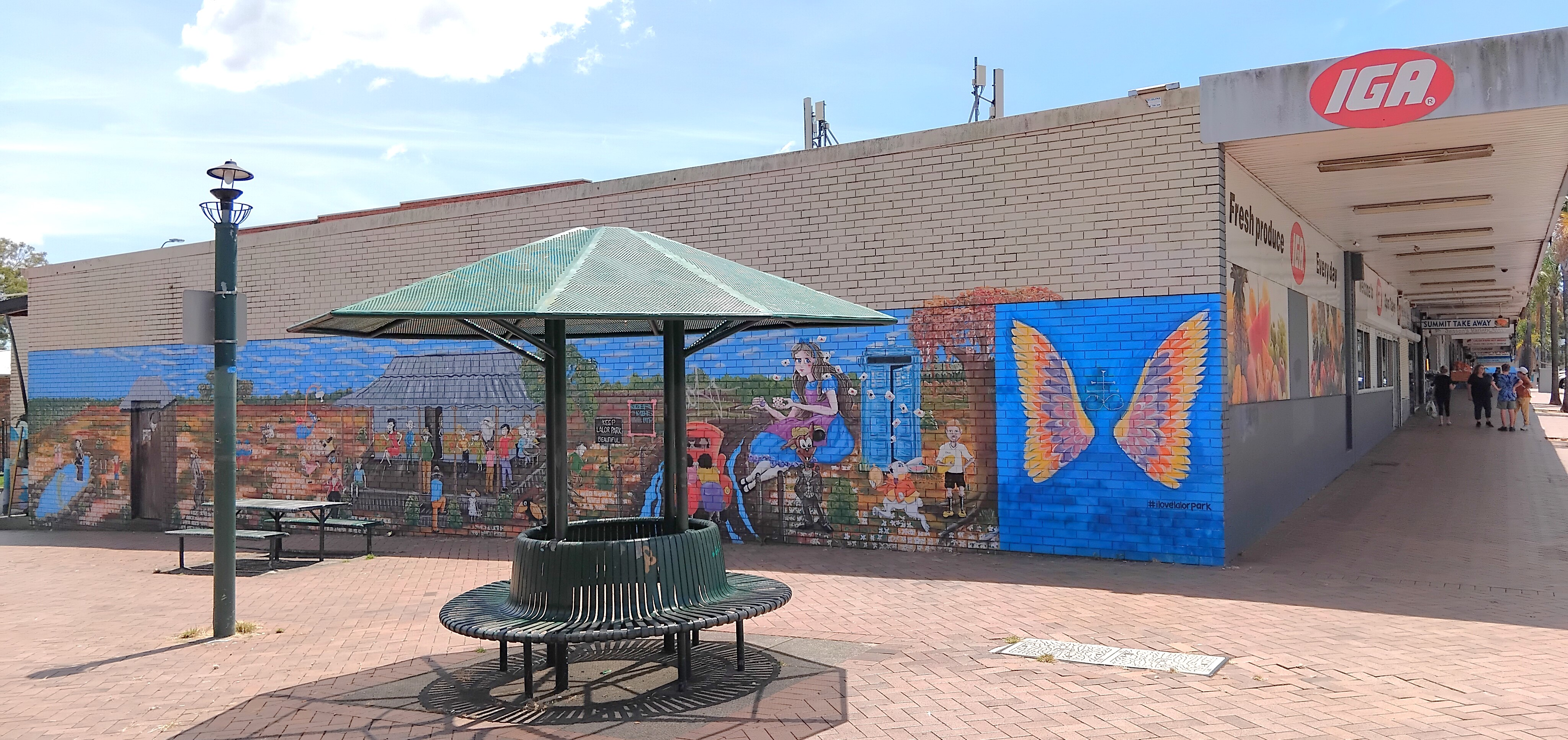
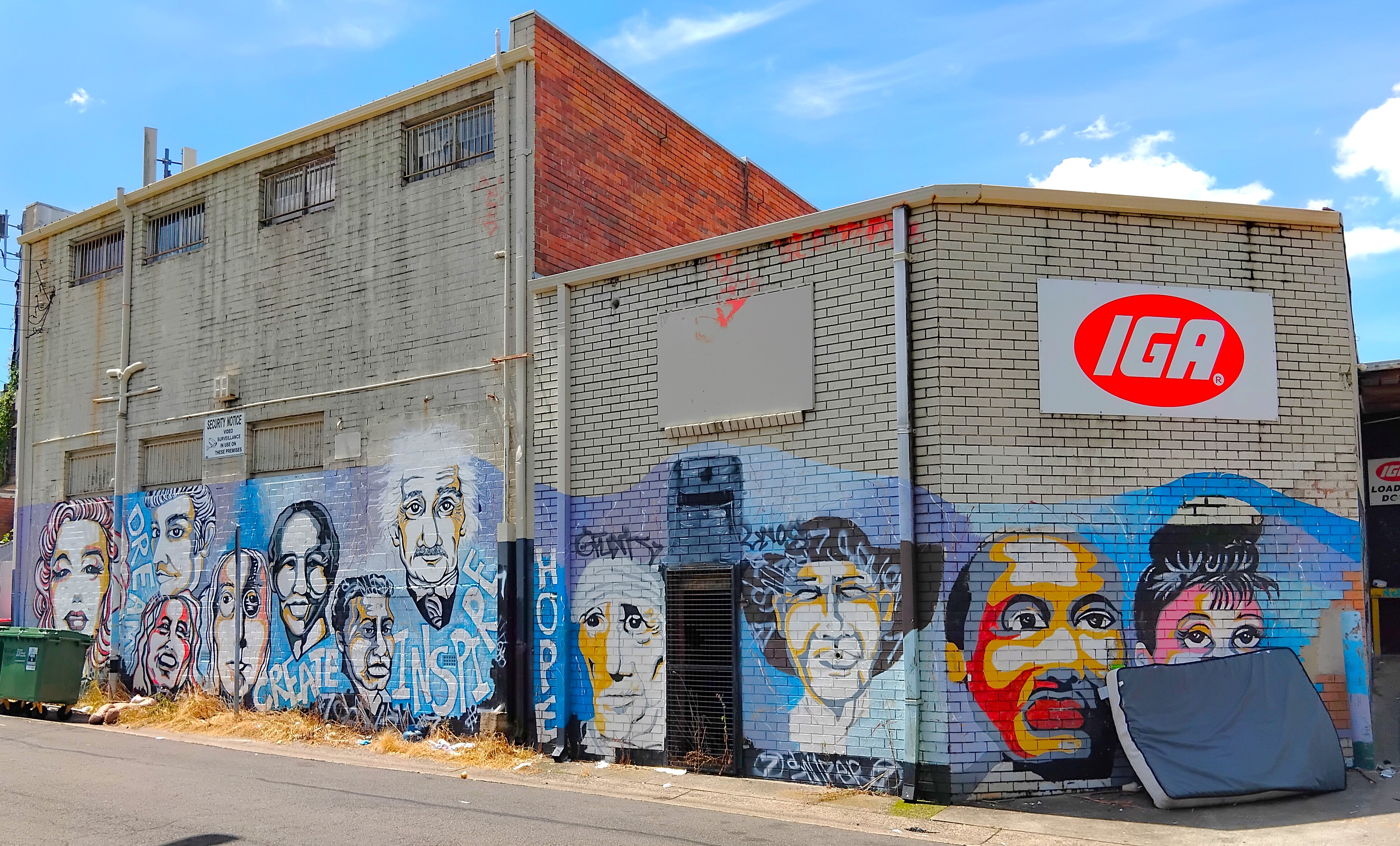
Many painted murals adorn the exterior walls around Lalor Park shops, and are the works of local artists

Serving the primarily residential suburb of Lalor Park is an outdoor shopping precinct with a few dozen retailers and small businesses, located at the junction of Northcott Road and Freeman Street. Although the exterior walls of the buildings were vandalised, the graffiti has since been covered by murals painted by Danielle RG of Creative Groundz and Nathan Marshall of Common Groundz Cafe.

== Education ==
Lalor Park is the location of a number of educational institutions including:

- Lalor Park Preschool – A community based preschool
- Lalor Park Public School – K-6 public primary school founded in 1959
- St Bernadette's Primary – systemic Catholic K-6 Primary School founded 1960 by the Sisters of St Joseph
- Kids' Early Learning Lalor Park – owned and operated by Blacktown City Council

== Sport ==
Lalor Park Kookaburras Rugby League Club was established in 1959. They compete in the Parramatta Junior Rugby League. The club's colours are blue, brown and white. Home ground for the Kookaburras is Cavanagh Reserve (Venn Ave, Lalor Park). Lalor Park juniors that have played 1st grade in Australia include Luke Lewis, Feleti Mateo, Brett Delaney, Jorge Taufua, Hohepa Puru, Niwhai Puru

== Transport ==
The suburb is served by the Blacktown-Parklea branch of the North-West T-way and Sydney Trains Seven Hills railway station.
