= Glenwood, New South Wales =

Glenwood
- Suburb
- Interactive map of Glenwood
- Country: Australia
- State: New South Wales
- City: Blacktown
- LGA: City of Blacktown
- Location: 31 km (19 mi) NW of Sydney CBD
- Established: 1996

Government
  - State electorate: Winston Hills
  - Federal division: Greenway
- Elevation: 72 m (236 ft)

Population
  - Total: 15,829 (2021 census)
- Postcode: 2768
Suburbs around Glenwood
Parklea	Stanhope Gardens	Kellyville
Acacia Gardens	Glenwood	Bella Vista
Kings Park	Kings Langley	Baulkham Hills

Glenwood is a suburb in the state of New South Wales, Australia. Glenwood is located around 30 kilometres north-west of the Sydney central business district in the local government area of the City of Blacktown.

== History ==
Glenwood takes its name from an historic property in the area, named 'Glenwood Park' in the 1940s, but previously known as Norfolk Vale (1846–1882), and Sorrento (1882–1941). It was formally recognised as a suburb in 1996.

It is noted as the first site to be developed within the Rouse Hill Development area.

== Heritage listings ==
Glenwood has a heritage-listed site, which is:

- 2 Knightsbridge Avenue: Exeter Farm

== Population ==
At the 2011 census, there were 15,325 residents in Glenwood. The population was younger than average, with a median age of 32, and 26.6% of people aged 14 years and under. Just over half of residents were born in Australia. The top other countries of birth are Philippines 5.1%, Indian 19.2% and Sri Lanka 2.5%. Almost half of residents spoke a language other than English at home. These languages included Punjabi 6.7%, Hindi 5.4% and Tagalog 3.1%. Most dwellings were separate houses and these tended to be large, with 81.6% having 4 or more bedrooms.

In the 2016 Census, there were 16,130 residents in Glenwood. The median age of the population was 34, younger than the median age for New South Wales and Australia (38 years). 23.2% of the people were 14 years and under. 51% of Glenwood's residents were born in Australia, 33.5% were born in India, 4.8% were born in the Philippines, 2.8% in Sri Lanka, 2% in China and 1.9% in Fiji. Only English was spoken in 50.1% of the homes but other languages spoken at home included Punjabi 9.5%, Hindi 5.6%, Tagalog 2.9%, Mandarin 2.6% and Sinhalese 2.1%.

In the 2021 Census, there were 15,829 residents in Glenwood. The median age of the population was 37, younger than the median age for New South Wales and Australia (38 years). 21.0% of the people were 14 years and under. 48.2% of Glenwood's residents were born in Australia, 18.7% were born in India, 4.0% in the Philippines, 3.0% in Sri Lanka, 2.7% in China and 1.7% in Fiji. Only English was spoken in 44.3% of the homes but other languages spoken at home included Punjabi 11.9%, Hindi 6.7%, Mandarin 3.3%, Tamil 2.9% and Tagalog 2.4%.

== Transport ==
The Westlink M7 Motorway runs along the southern border of the suburb and provides a link to the M2 Hills Motorway. Old Windsor Road borders the suburb to the east & Sunnyholt Rd borders the suburb to the west & north.

Glenwood is served by Bella Vista and Norwest stations on the Sydney Metro Northwest, with high frequency services to Macquarie Park, Chatswood, the Sydney CBD and Tallawong

CDC NSW provides services to Rouse Hill (663, 664, 665), Parramatta (663, 664, 665) and Sydney CBD (607X, 616X) whilst Busways provides regular services to Rouse Hill (735), Riverstone (734), Blacktown (730, 734, 735), Bella Vista (745) and Castle Hill (730).

The suburb is serviced by Burns and Sorrento stations on the Blacktown-Parklea branch of the North-West T-way, and Burns, Balmoral, Celebration, Meurants and Norbrik stations on the Rouse Hill-Parramatta section of the T-way.

== Schools ==
Glenwood High School, Caddies Creek Public School, Parklea Public School and Holy Cross Primary School.

== Churches ==
Emmanuel Baptist Church

== Valentine Sport Park ==
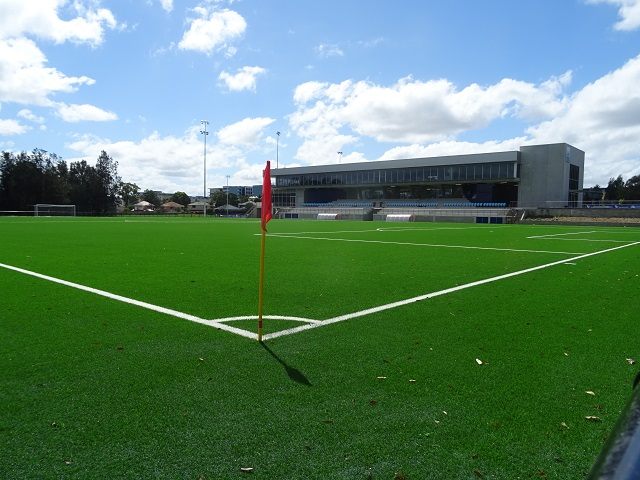
Valentine Park

Valentine Sport Park, at which the headquarters of Football NSW are located, in Glenwood is a multipurpose sporting complex which caters for various groups, as well as individuals.

== Sporting clubs ==
Sporting clubs in the Glenwood suburb include:

=== Rugby League ===
- Northwest Hurricanes Junior Rugby League Club
- St Patricks Blacktown Junior Rugby League Club (despite the name, this club is based in Glenwood.)

=== Netball ===
- Glenwood Netball Club

=== Association Football ===
- Glenwood Redbacks Soccer Club

=== Rugby Union ===
- Blacktown Warriors Rugby Union Football Club
- Norwest "Bulls" Junior Rugby Union Club
