= Stanhope Gardens, New South Wales =

Stanhope Gardens
- Suburb
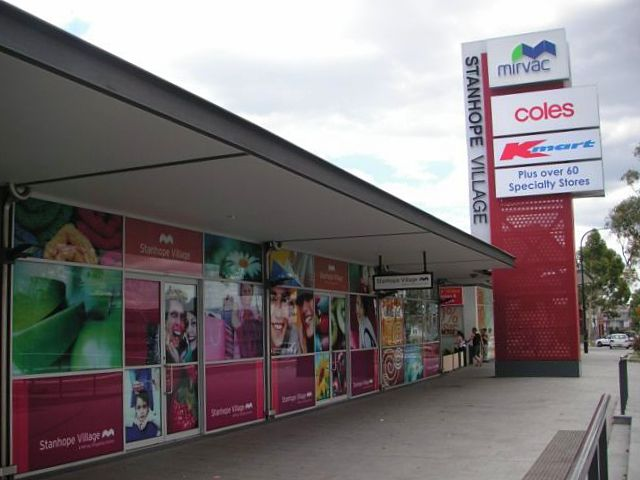
- Stanhope Village shopping centre

- Interactive map of Stanhope Gardens
- Country: Australia
- State: New South Wales
- City: Sydney
- LGA: City of Blacktown
- Location: 42 km (26 mi) north-west of Sydney CBD
- Established: 1996

Government
  - State electorate: Riverstone
  - Federal division: Greenway
- Elevation: 54 m (177 ft)

Population
  - Total: 9,349 (2021 census)
- Postcode: 2768
Suburbs around Stanhope Gardens
Quakers Hill	Kellyville Ridge	Rouse Hill
Parklea	Stanhope Gardens	Kellyville
Parklea	Glenwood	Kellyville

Stanhope Gardens is a suburb of Greater Western Sydney, in the state of New South Wales, Australia. Stanhope Gardens is located 42 kilometres north-west of the Sydney central business district in the local government area of City of Blacktown.

== Population ==
In the 2021 Census, there were 9,349 people in Stanhope Gardens. 50.3% of people were born in Australia. The next most common countries of birth were India 12.6%, Philippines 5.1%, China 3.0%, England 2.2% and New Zealand 1.8%.

50.9% of people spoke only English at home. Other languages spoken at home included Hindi 6.3%, Mandarin 3.8%, Punjabi 3.2%, Tagalog 2.7% and Gujarati 2.0%. The most common responses for religion were Catholic 24.6%, No Religion 20.0%, Hinduism 15.1% and Anglican 9.3%.

== History ==
John Hillas (1768–1837) arrived in Australia in 1801 and received two land grants (in 1801 and 1804) on the Windsor Road. The second of these, of 150 acres, he named "Stanhope Farm". He established an inn, the Stanhope Arms on Windsor Road, to cater for the traffic between the Macquarie Towns and Parramatta.

By 1856, the Pearce family owned Stanhope Farm. In 1928, Jack Peel bought Stanhope Farm and called it Stanhope Park Dairy.

In 1973, the New South Wales Housing Commission compulsorily resumed Stanhope Park Dairy.

The suburb name reflects these early properties. Stanhope Gardens Estate opened in 1995 and was recognised as a suburb in 1996.

When Stanhope Gardens was first being developed into what it is today, it was called Irish Town, Kellyville and Parklea. A petition was sent around with most people voting to keep Stanhope in the name, becoming Stanhope Gardens.

Newbury Estate – a master-planned estate – now occupies a large part of the suburb of Stanhope Gardens, planned by Landcom in 1999 and majority built by Mirvac. Newbury estate compromise of 1,761 properties, subdivided into seven community title subdivisions, each with its community facility including a clubhouse, tennis court, pool, spa and BBQ area.

== Education ==
Schools located in Stanhope Gardens includes:

- John XXIII Catholic Primary School (Catholic Primary School, 160 Perfection Ave, Stanhope Gardens NSW 2768).
- St Mark's Catholic College (Catholic High School, 160 Perfection Ave, Stanhope Gardens NSW 2768).

Stanhope Gardens has the following public school catchment:

- John Palmer Public School (Public Primary School, The Ponds).
- Kellyville Ridge Public School (Public Primary School, Kellyville Ridge).
- Parklea Public School (Public Primary School, Glenwood).
- Glenwood High School (Public High School, Glenwood).
- The Ponds High School (Public High School, The Ponds).
- Rouse Hill High School (Public High School, Rouse Hill).

== Transport ==
Public transport is provided by private bus operators CDC NSW (route 6xx) and Busways (route 7xx), under contract from Transport for NSW. Services are available to Sydney CBD, Parramatta, Rouse Hill, Blacktown, Castle Hill, Pennant Hills and Epping.

The suburb is served by Stanhope Station on the Blacktown-Parklea branch of the North-West T-way. It is also close to Kellyville station on the Sydney Metro Northwest, and is connected by bus routes 603, 632 and 735

Eastbound bus services that serve Stanhope Gardens are:

From Stanhope T-way

- Route 735 to Blacktown via T-way

From Stanhope Village

- Route 616X to City QVB via Glenwood (weekday mornings only)
- Route 663 to Parramatta via Glenwood
- Route 745 to Bella Vista via Glenwood
- Route 731 to Blacktown via Acacia Gardens
- Route 734 to Blacktown

From Perfection Ave

- Route 603 to Parramatta via Kellyville station and Castle Hill
- Route 632 to Pennant Hills via Kellyville Station and Norwest Station

In the westbound direction:

From Stanhope T-way

- Route 735 to Rouse Hill

From Stanhope Village

- Route 616X to Kellyville Ridge (weekday afternoons only)
- Route 663 to Rouse Hill Station via Kellyville Ridge
- Route 745 to St Marys via Quakers Hill and Plumpton
- Route 731 to Rouse Hill Station
- Route 734 to Riverstone via The Ponds

From Perfection Ave

- Route 603 to Rouse Hill Station via Kellyville Ridge
- Route 632 to Rouse Hill Station via Kellyville Ridge

== Sport and recreation ==
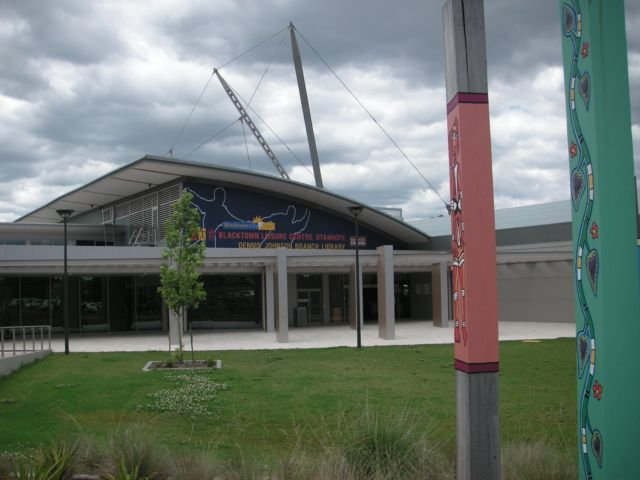
Blacktown Leisure Centre Stanhope

Blacktown Leisure Centre Stanhope is a fitness and swimming centre with a wave pool and library. Located opposite the shopping centre, it is operated by the Blacktown City Council. It hosted the 2016 Women's Oceania Handball Championship in October 2016.

== Places of worship ==
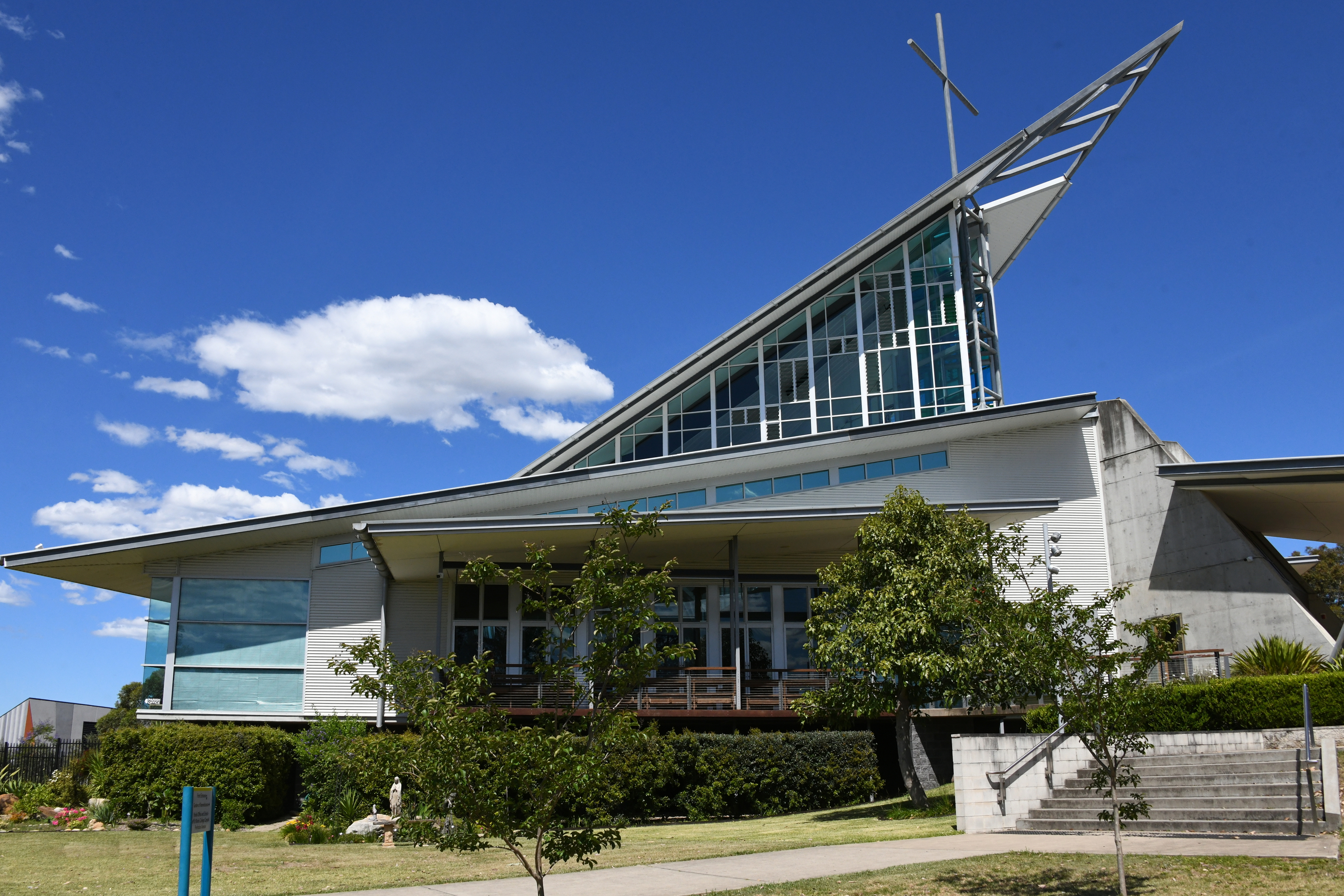
St John XXIII Catholic Church

Stanhope Anglican Church holds services in a dedicated building on View St, opened in July 2020. The Catholic Parish of Blessed John XXIII holds services in the Church on Perfection Avenue, Stanhope Gardens. Attached to the Church is John 23rd Catholic Primary School (pre-school to Year 6), and St Marks Catholic Secondary College (years 7–12).

== Politics ==
The suburb is in the Electoral district of Riverstone for the state of New South Wales. At Federal level, the suburb is located in the Division of Greenway.

== Commercial area ==
Stanhope Village is a sub-regional shopping centre anchored by supermarkets and 40 other specialised retail, service, fashion and food outlets. In March 2015 a redevelopment and extension of the centre was opened.
