= Glenwood High School (Australia) =

Location
- Glenwood Park Dr &, Forman Ave. Glenwood, New South Wales; Australia; 33.73286°S 150.93748°E

Information
- Type: Public, co-educational, day school
- Motto: Opportunity Through Learning
- Established: 2005
- Principal: Sonja Anderson
- Staff: 106
- Enrolment: 1500 students (Years 7–12)
- Campus: Urban
- Colours: Blue, grey and white
- Slogan: Opportunity through learning
- Website: glenwood-h.schools.nsw.gov.au
- Last updated: 8 March 2023

Glenwood High School is a public high school located in Glenwood, New South Wales, Australia. It opened in 2005 with 490 students across two grades, Year 7 and Year 8. As of 2022 it had 1500+ students across Years 7–12.

Glenwood High School was ranked 177 in NSW in 2022, based on Higher School Certificate Results.
