= Woodcroft, New South Wales =

Woodcroft
- Suburb
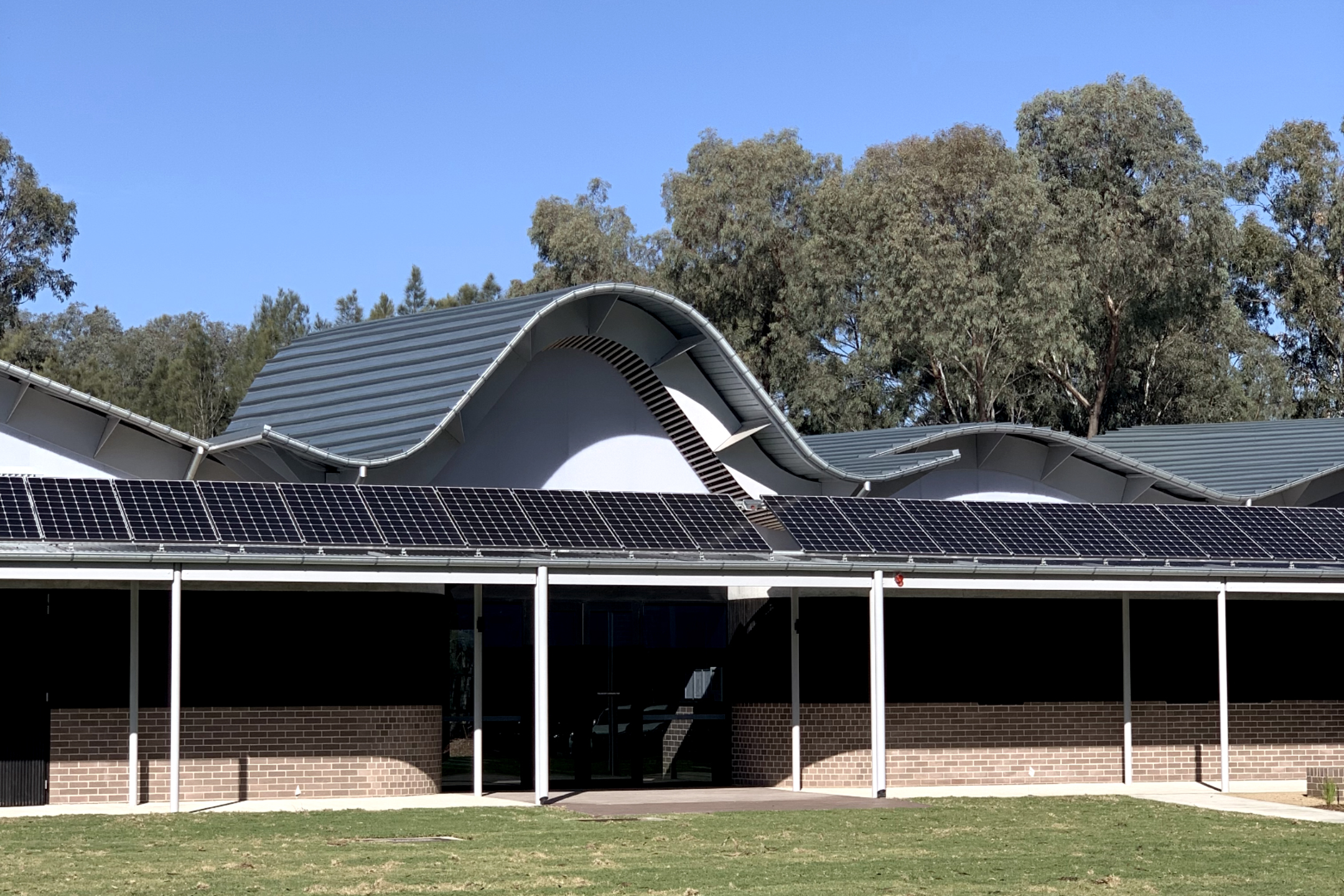
- Woodcroft Neighbourhood Centre

- Interactive map of Woodcroft
- Country: Australia
- State: New South Wales
- City: Sydney
- LGA: City of Blacktown
- Location: 37 km (23 mi) west of Sydney CBD
- Established: 1996

Government
  - State electorate: Blacktown
  - Federal division: Chifley
- Elevation: 36 m (118 ft)

Population
  - Total: 6,597 (2021 census)
- Postcode: 2767
Suburbs around Woodcroft
Quakers Hill	Marayong	Marayong
Doonside	Woodcroft	Blacktown
Doonside	Doonside	Blacktown

Woodcroft is a suburb of Sydney, in the state of New South Wales, Australia. Woodcroft is located 37 kilometres west of the Sydney central business district, in the local government area of the City of Blacktown and is part of the Greater Western Sydney region. Woodcroft Lake is on Bricketwood Drive and the Neighbourhood Centre is beside it. It is popular among the community. The suburb contains many play areas.

== History ==
From 1969 to 1988 Woodcroft was the State Brickworks in Doonside (and prior to 1969 it was the location of the State Timberworks). In 1989, the land was purchased by estate agents and developers LJ Hooker. After rezoning, residential construction commenced in 1992 and Woodcroft was formally recognised as a suburb in 1996.

== Commercial area ==
There is a modest independent retail mall on Richmond Road. Services include a service station, supermarket, doctor's surgery, and a variety of independent and franchise fast food outlets.

Facilities such as disabled toilets, parenting rooms, and children's play areas, are limited.

== Transport ==
The Blacktown Social Plan shows that Woodcroft households are much more likely to have one car than is usual across both the city of Blacktown, and the Sydney greater metropolitan area. However they are also much less likely to have two or more cars than is usual. This is somewhat of an indication of the transport connections throughout the area and the demographic of the population.

Access to public transport is somewhat limited, being via bus to either Blacktown, Doonside or Quakers Hill railway stations. Most households have one car.

The M7 motorway is accessible to Woodcroft via either Richmond Road or Quakers Hill Parkway. Since it opened in December 2005, this has improved access to the Hills District, Liverpool, and provided connections to both the M2 and M4 motorways.

== Housing ==
The predominant form of housing throughout the suburb are free standing single homes, apartments and 19.0% are townhouses, semi-detached or similar. A number of streets in Woodcroft are named after well-known Australian lakes; for example, Burrinjuck Drive is named after Burrinjuck Dam and Burragorang Street is named after Lake Burragorang.

== Landmarks ==
=== Woodcroft Lake ===
Woodcroft features a small man-made lake called Woodcroft Lake, on the area of a former Brick Pit. Each year, in September, the lake and surrounding park is home to the Woodcroft Festival.

=== Woodcroft Neighbourhood Centre ===
In 2019, a new Neighbourhood Centre designed by Carter Williamson Architects was opened. It replaced the previous neighbourhood centre which was destroyed by a fire in 2015.

=== Woodcroft Reserve ===
Located along Woodcroft Drive, Woodcroft Reserve features two multi-purpose courts and outdoor fitness equipment. The reserve also has a playspace with features such as a flying fox, trampoline and toddler-friendly swings.

== Population ==
The Blacktown Social Plan indicates that between 1996 and 2001 census, the population increased from 1683 to 4969 people, an increase of over 195%. This is linked directly to the level of residential development occurring throughout the 1990s. It has since stabilised somewhat, growing to 5,355 in 2006, 6,440 at the 2016 census and 6,597 at the 2021 census. 23.1% of the population was born in the Philippines in 2011, the highest proportion born in the Philippines in Sydney. This had fallen slightly to 21.1% in 2016 and 19.3% in 2021.
