= Kings Langley, New South Wales =

Kings Langley
- Suburb
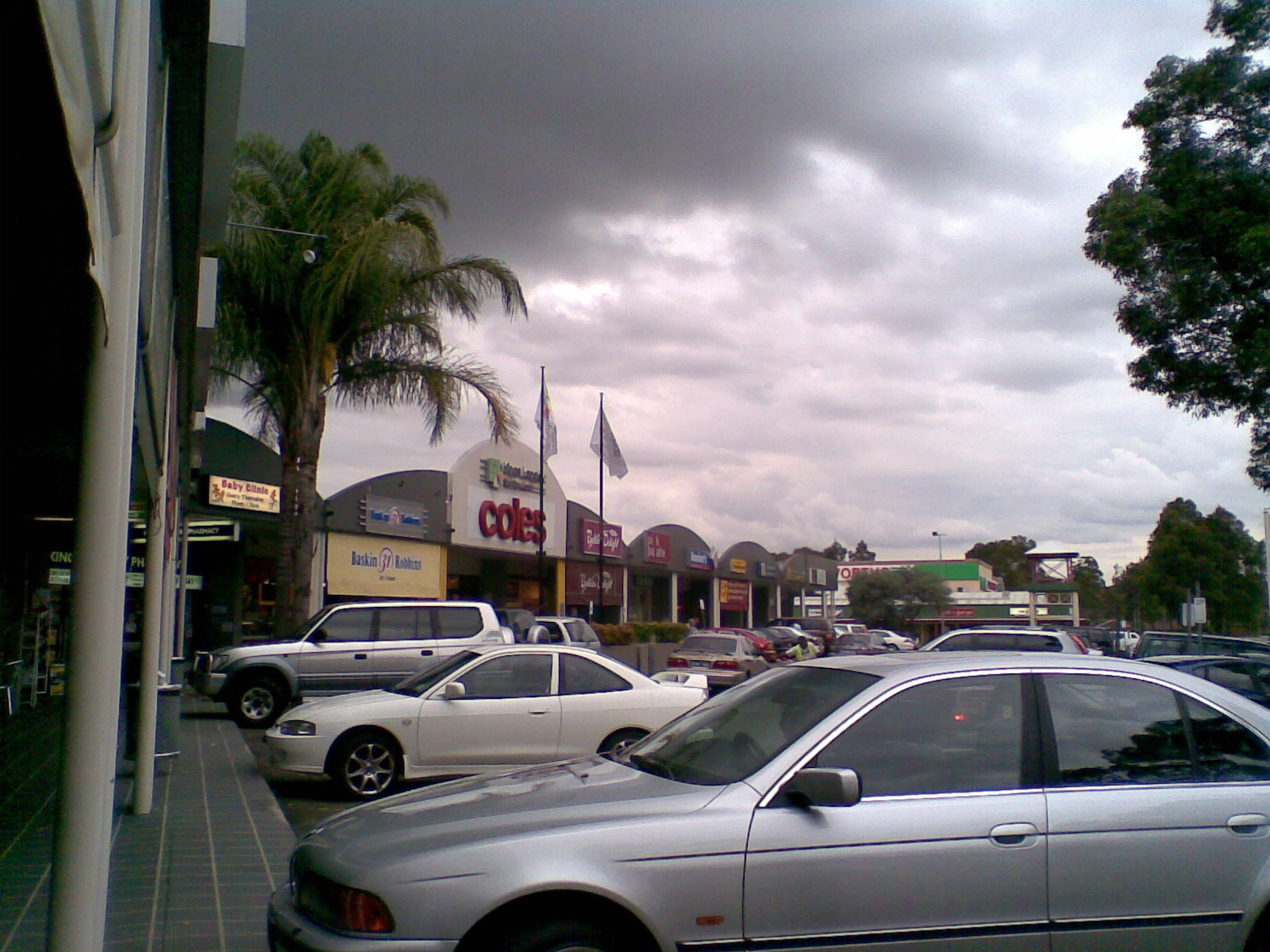
- Kings Langley Shopping Centre

- Interactive map of Kings Langley
- Country: Australia
- State: New South Wales
- City: Sydney
- LGA: Blacktown
- Location: 33 km (21 mi) NW of Sydney CBD
- Established: 1976

Government
  - State electorate: Winston Hills
  - Federal division: Greenway
- Elevation: 59 m (194 ft)

Population
  - Total: 9,354 (2021 census)
- Postcode: 2147
Suburbs around Kings Langley
Acacia Gardens	Glenwood	Bella Vista
Kings Park	Kings Langley	Bella Vista
Blacktown	Lalor Park	Seven Hills

Kings Langley is a suburb of Sydney, in the state of New South Wales, Australia. Kings Langley is located 28.3 kilometres north-west in a straight line from the Sydney central business district in the local government area of Blacktown City council.

The suburb extends from the south-west of Vardys Road and Sunnyholt Road, with the north-east adjacent the Glenwood, Bella Vista and Baulkham Hills areas.

Homely, a real estate website, gave an overall score of 9.4/10 and ranked it the 14th-best suburb in Sydney.

== History ==
Early settler Matthew Pearce (1762–1831) called his 160-acre (65 ha) land grant after Kings Langley Manor House in Hertfordshire, England, where he was said to have been born. Pearce's grant was situated on the opposite side of the Old Windsor Road to the present day suburb of Kings Langley. A housing scheme used the name in the 1970s. It was recognised as a "neighbourhood" in 1976 and classified as a suburb in 1987.

== Transport ==
Kings Langley is well served by public transport, including Hillsbus routes 661, 706, 715, 705 and Busways routes 743 and 718. Those bus routes connect it with the larger suburbs of Blacktown, Castle Hill, Seven Hills, Westmead and Parramatta.

The suburb is served by Joseph Banks and Troubadour bus stations on the North-West T-way, providing connections to North Sydney (602X), Sydney CBD (607X, 607N), Rouse Hill (663, 664, 665), Castle Hill (662), Norwest (664) and Parramatta (660–665) as well as James Cook station on the Blacktown- Parklea T-way, providing services to Blacktown (730–735), Castle Hill (730), Rouse Hill (731, 735) and Schofields (734).

Kings Langley is 10 minutes away from Seven Hills and Marayong Sydney Trains stations, and also 10 minutes away from Bella Vista and Norwest Metro Trains Sydney stations.

A trip to the Sydney CBD in the off-peak can take in 27 minutes via the M2 Hills Motorway. Access to Western Sydney was improved by the opening of the Westlink M7 in December 2005.

== Services ==
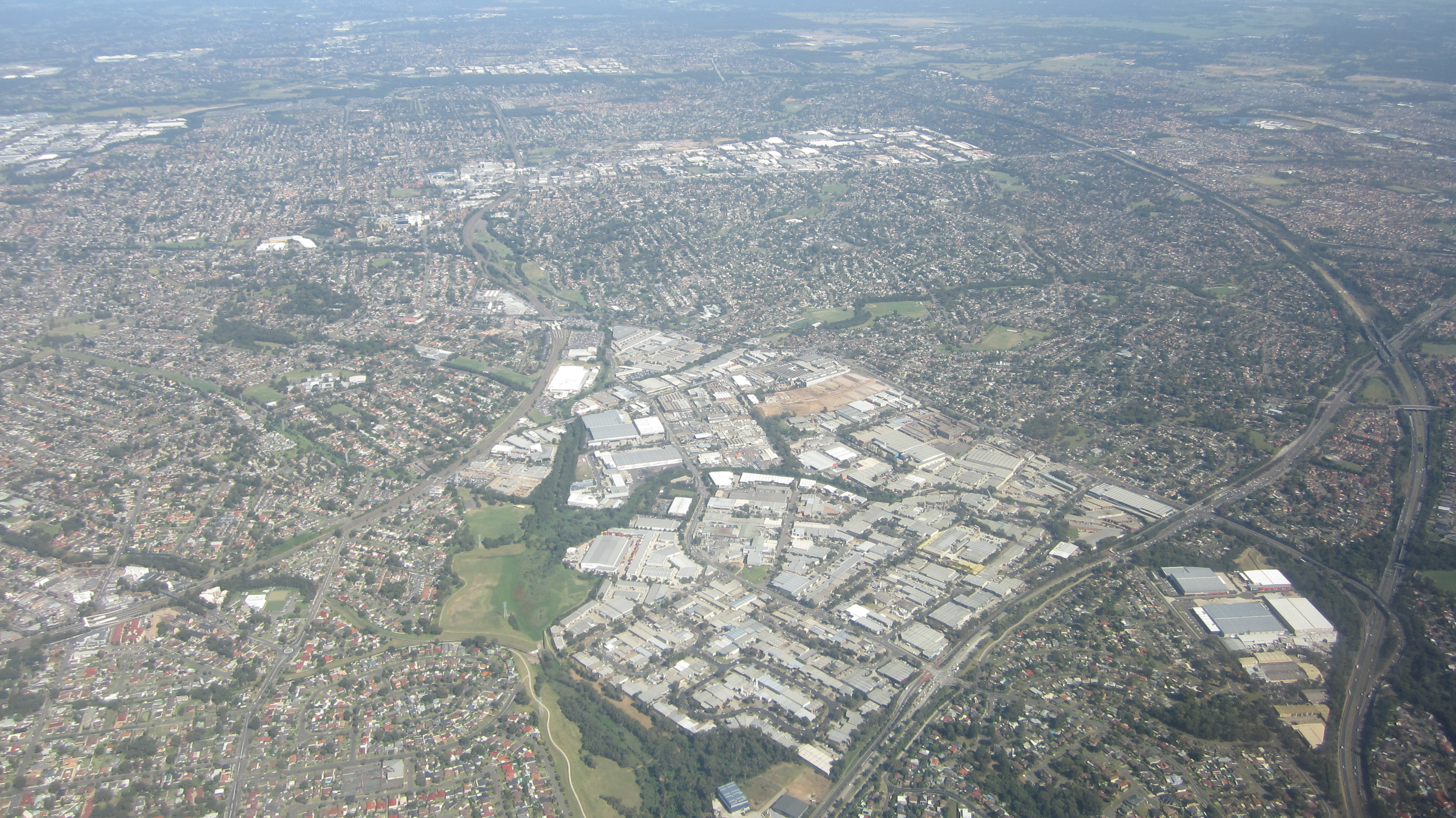
Kings Langley Area

Kings Langley has three shopping centres. Kings Langley Central is located on James Cook Drive and includes a Coles as well as many speciality stores. In the same precinct Kings Langley shopping Centre located directly opposite Kings Langley Central includes Woolworths Supermarket, and some other specialty stores. The two were formerly known as Kings Langley shopping centre however the shopping centre with Coles supermarket has come under new ownership by Charter Hall. The smaller Solander Centre has a convenience store, Speedway petrol station and several specialty stores. Kings Langley is close to both Blacktown Hospital and the Norwest Private Hospital.

== Education ==
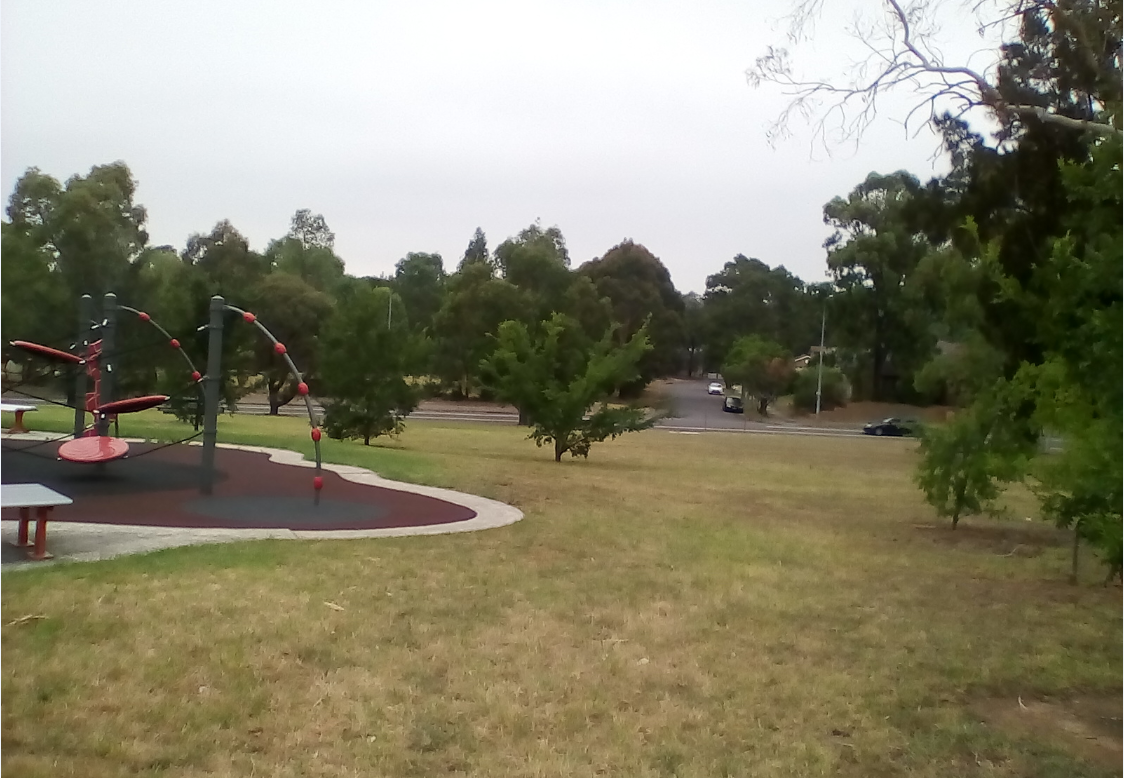
Parks are an integral feature of Kings Langley

Kings Langley is served by several government schools. Two primary schools are located in the suburb: Vardys Road Primary School on Vardys Road (established in 1959) and Kings Langley Public School (established in 1981) on Isaac Smith Parade. There is no high school in Kings Langley, but the suburb falls in the catchment area for St Andrews in Marayong, Patrician Brothers Blacktown, Nagle College, Blacktown Boys High School, Blacktown Girls High School and Seven Hills High School. Many parents in Kings Langley choose to have their children educated in nearby Baulkham Hills at Crestwood High School and Model Farms High School.

== Demographics ==
According to the 2021 census of Population, there were 9,354 people in Kings Langley.

- Aboriginal and Torres Strait Islander people made up 1.0% of the population.
- 69.8% of people were born in Australia. The next most common countries of birth were India 3.6%, England 3.0%, China 2.5%, New Zealand 1.6% and Philippines 1.0%.
- 73.5% of people spoke only English at home. Other languages spoken at home included Mandarin 3.2%, Cantonese 1.5%, Tamil 1.3%, Spanish 1.2% and Arabic 1.2%.
- The most common responses for religion were Catholic 29.7%, No Religion 27.0% and Anglican 14.7%.
- Unemployment was recorded at 3.8%.
- Median family income was $2,694 per week compared to the Australian median of $2,120.
