= Crestwood, Sydney =

Crestwood
- Interactive map of Crestwood
- Coordinates: 33°44′35″S 150°58′26″E
- Country: Australia
- State: New South Wales
- City: Sydney
- LGA: The Hills Shire

Government
  - State electorate: Kellyville
  - Federal division: Mitchell

Crestwood is an urban place in Sydney, New South Wales, Australia. Crestwood is located in the suburb of Baulkham Hills in the local government area of The Hills Shire.

== Education ==
- Crestwood High School - 7-12 Government Owned. Founded 1981.
- Crestwood Public School - K-6 Government Owned (Crestwood High feeder school); founded 1972.
- St Michael's Primary School - K-6 Catholic School (Gilroy College and Oakhill College feeder school); founded 1972.

== Crestwood Reserve ==
Is a large public park located in the centre of Crestwood, facilities include:

- 2 Rugby League fields
- 6 Tennis courts
- 2 Playgrounds
- 2 Half court Basketball courts
- Netball courts
- Picnic and BBQ facilities
- Fenced dog leash free area
- Skate park
- Girl Guides hall

== Places of worship ==
Norwest Anglican - formerly known as Crestwood Anglican Church or St Andrews Crestwood - is located in Crestwood, adjacent to Crestwood High. Chapel Lane is the evening service of Norwest Anglican

== History ==
The area was developed between 1966 and the early 1970s. The land had been part of Joseph Foveaux's estate, acquired by John Macarthur, then returned to the crown in exchange for land elsewhere. It was built in the headwaters of Toongabbie creek.
