= North-West T-way =

Roads in New South Wales

Overview
- Operator: Busways; CDC NSW
- Began service: 10 March 2007

Route
- Start: Blacktown station Rouse Hill station
- Via: Norwest Business Park; Westmead Hospital
- End: Parramatta station
- Length: 24 km

The North-West T-way is a continuous series of bus-only lanes and bus roadways between Parramatta, Blacktown and Rouse Hill in Western Sydney. Opened in stages between March and November 2007, the 24 km (14.9 mi) T-way was the second bus rapid transit route to be built in Sydney after the Liverpool–Parramatta T-way.

== Alignment ==
The T-way follows Old Windsor Road north from Westmead Hospital. At Memorial Avenue, Kellyville, the route branches, with one branch continuing north along Old Windsor and Windsor roads to Rouse Hill Town Centre and the other heading west along Sunnyholt Road to Blacktown.

The alignment includes 10 new bridges and two new underpasses. Three of the T-way's 24 route-kilometres are bus lanes on existing roads.

The Bella Vista–Rouse Hill section of the T-way runs parallel with the Sydney Metro Northwest rail line.

Interactive map of the North-West T-way. Only the sections that are separate from public roads are marked, but the map includes all stops along the T-way.

== Construction ==
The Government of New South Wales announced the T-way network as part of its Action for Transport plan in 1998. The North-West project was approved in February 2004 and was jointly overseen by the then Ministry of Transport and Roads & Traffic Authority. The contract was awarded to Leighton Contractors in December 2004 and construction began in June 2005. Construction took place alongside a major upgrade and widening program on Windsor and Old Windsor roads, known as 'All the way to Windsor'.

The design was said to avoid many of the mistakes that had made the earlier Liverpool–Parramatta T-way so expensive to build.

The T-way opened in three stages:

- Parramatta to Merriville Road, Rouse Hill – 10 March 2007
- Merriville Road to Rouse Hill Town Centre – 25 September 2007
- Blacktown branch – 4 November 2007

A fourth section, continuing from the Blacktown branch and between Burns Interchange to Castle Hill, was never constructed.

== Stations ==
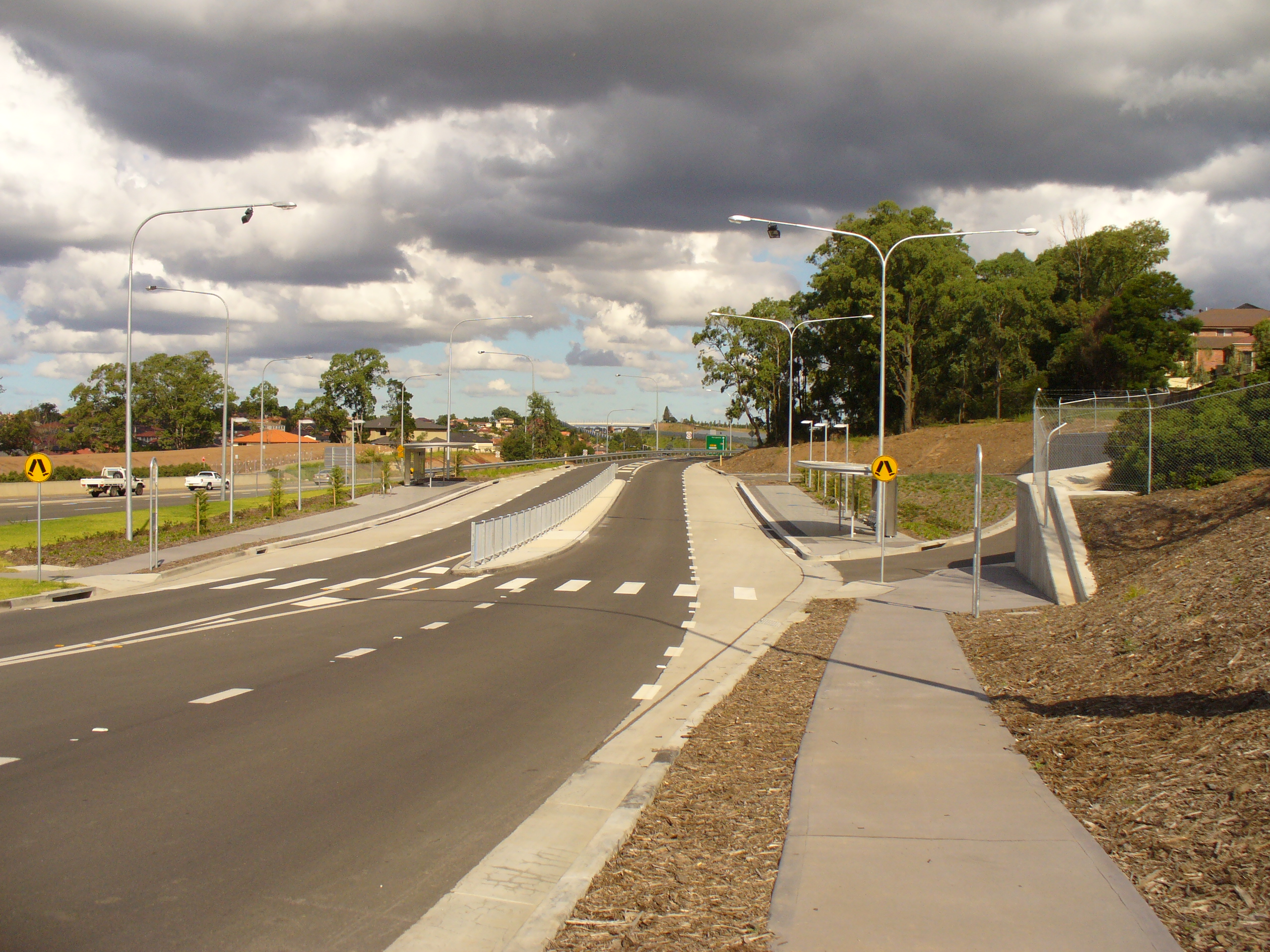
Norbrik

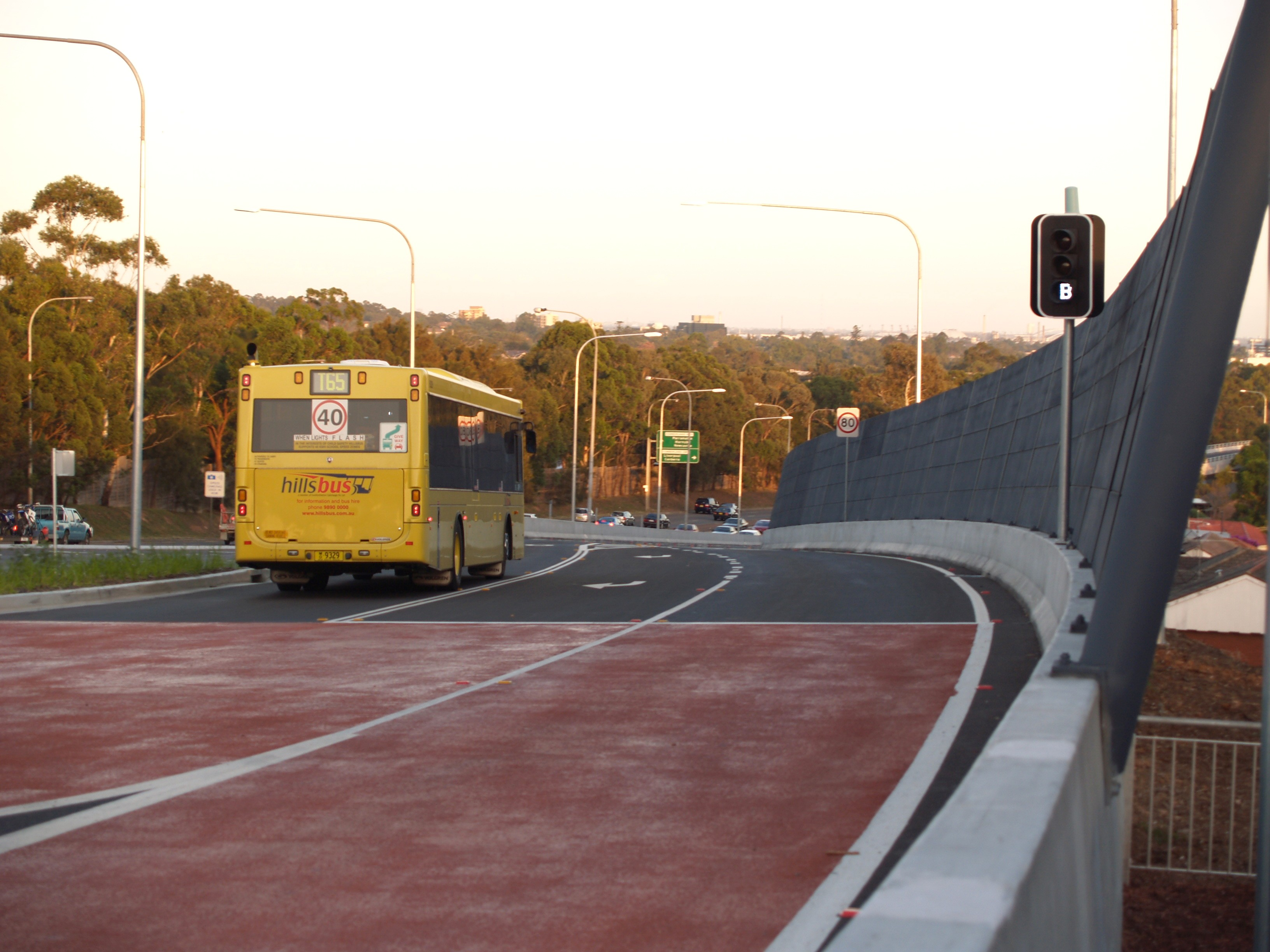
Constitution Hill

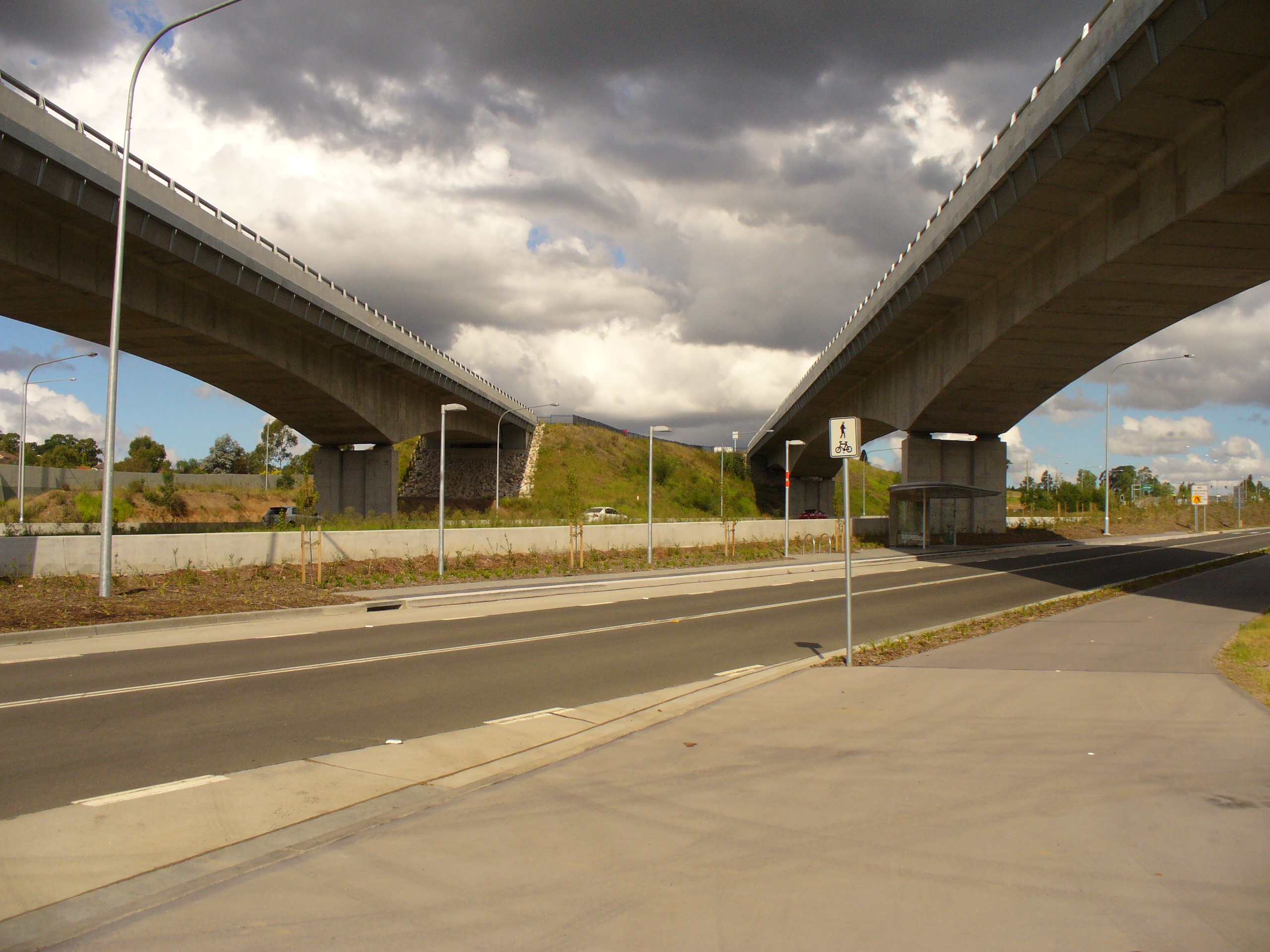
Troubadour

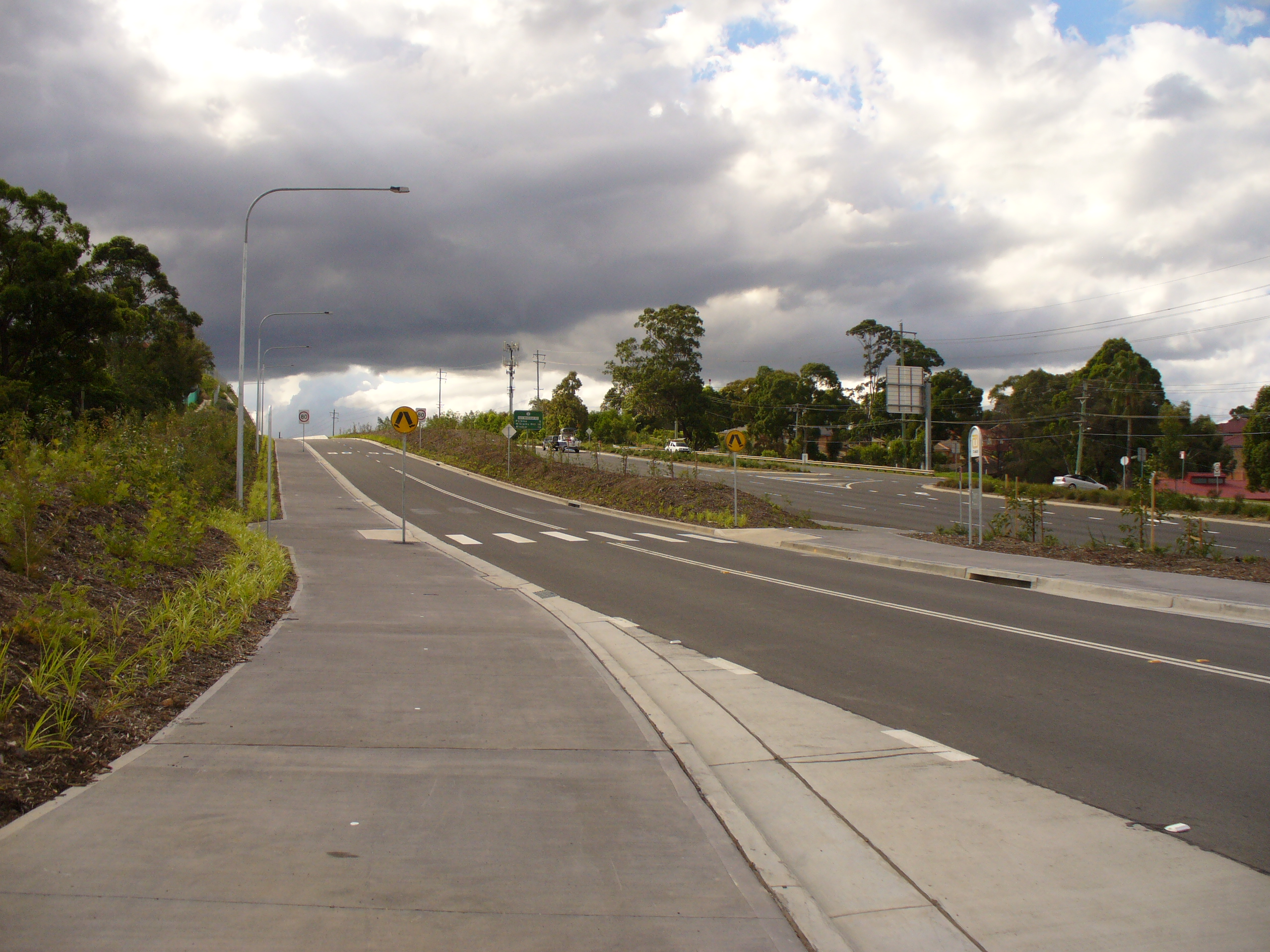
Abbott

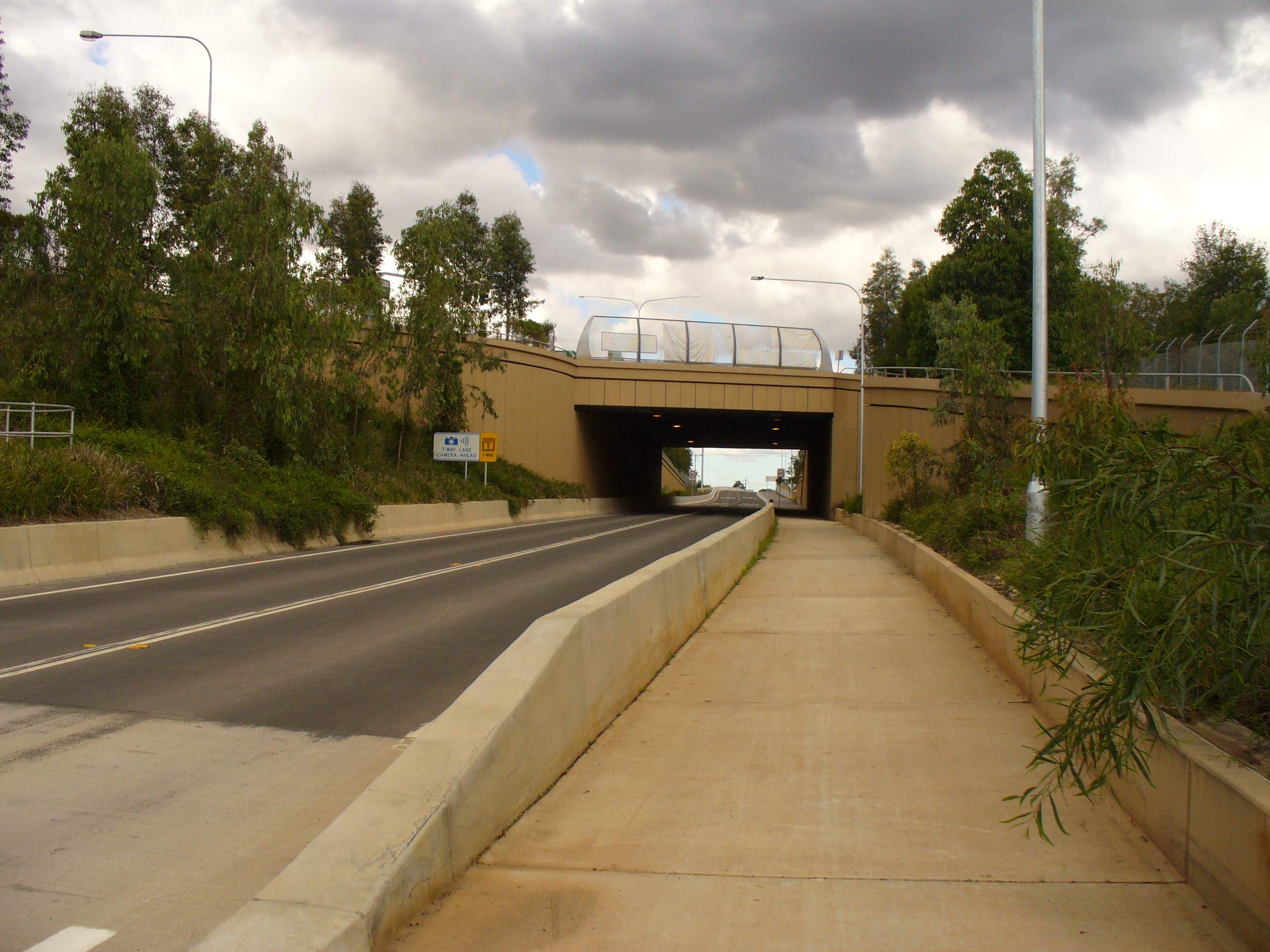
Seven Hills

The North-West T-way has 30 stations, spaced approximately every 800 metres. Stations feature closed-circuit television, real-time information screens, emergency help points, audio announcements and extensive landscaping.

One station, Parramatta, also forms part of the Liverpool–Parramatta T-way. The other stations are, from Parramatta:

- Westmead Station, Westmead
- Hospital, at Westmead Hospital
- Mons, at Mons Road, Westmead
- Briens, at Briens Road, Northmead
- Constitution Hill
- Fitzwilliam, near Fitzwilliam Road, Constitution Hill
- Johnstons, near Johnstons Bridge, Old Toongabbie
- Powers, near Powers Road, Seven Hills
- Abbott, near Abbott Road (Prospect Highway), Seven Hills
- Joseph Banks, near Joseph Banks Drive, Kings Langley
- Troubador, near Troubador Park, Kings Langley
- Norbrik, near Norbrik Drive, Glenwood
- Meurants, near Meurants Lane, Glenwood
- Bella Vista Station (formerly Celebration), Glenwood
- Burns, near Memorial Avenue (formerly Burns Road), Kellyville

From Burns, the Blacktown branch proceeds to:

- Stanhope, near Stanhope Parkway, Glenwood
- Sorrento, near Sorrento Drive, Glenwood
- Wilson, near Wilson Road, Glenwood
- James Cook, near James Cook Drive, Kings Langley
- Vardys, near Vardys Road, Blacktown
- Turner, near Turner Street, Blacktown
- Bessemer, near Bessemer Street, Blacktown
- Sackville, near Sackville Street, Blacktown
- Devitt, near Devitt Street, Blacktown
- Blacktown Station, Blacktown

From Burns, the Rouse Hill branch proceeds to:

- Kellyville Station (formerly Riley), Kellyville
- Merriville, near Merriville Road, Rouse Hill
- Sanctuary, near Sanctuary Drive, Rouse Hill
- Rouse Hill Station (formerly Rouse Hill), Rouse Hill

After the opening of Sydney Metro Northwest, a number of T-way stations were renamed by Transport for NSW, and became part of the bus interchanges belonging to the new metro stations. However, at a number of these stations, the old signage with the old station names have remained, with only the bus stop information sign and timetable containing the new names for each stop. The changes were:

- Rouse Hill renamed Rouse Hill Station, with stops named:
  - North-West T-way opposite Rouse Hill Station (towards Parramatta and Blacktown)
  - Rouse Hill Station, North-West T-way (towards Rouse Hill)
- Riley renamed Kellyville Station, with stops named:
  - Kellyville Station, North-West T-way, Stand A (towards Parramatta and Blacktown)
  - Kellyville Station, North-West T-way, Stand B (towards Rouse Hill)
- Celebration renamed Bella Vista Station, with stops named:
  - Bella Vista Station, North-West T-way, Stand C (towards Blacktown and Parramatta)
  - Bella Vista Station, North-West T-way, Stand D (towards Rouse Hill)

== Services ==
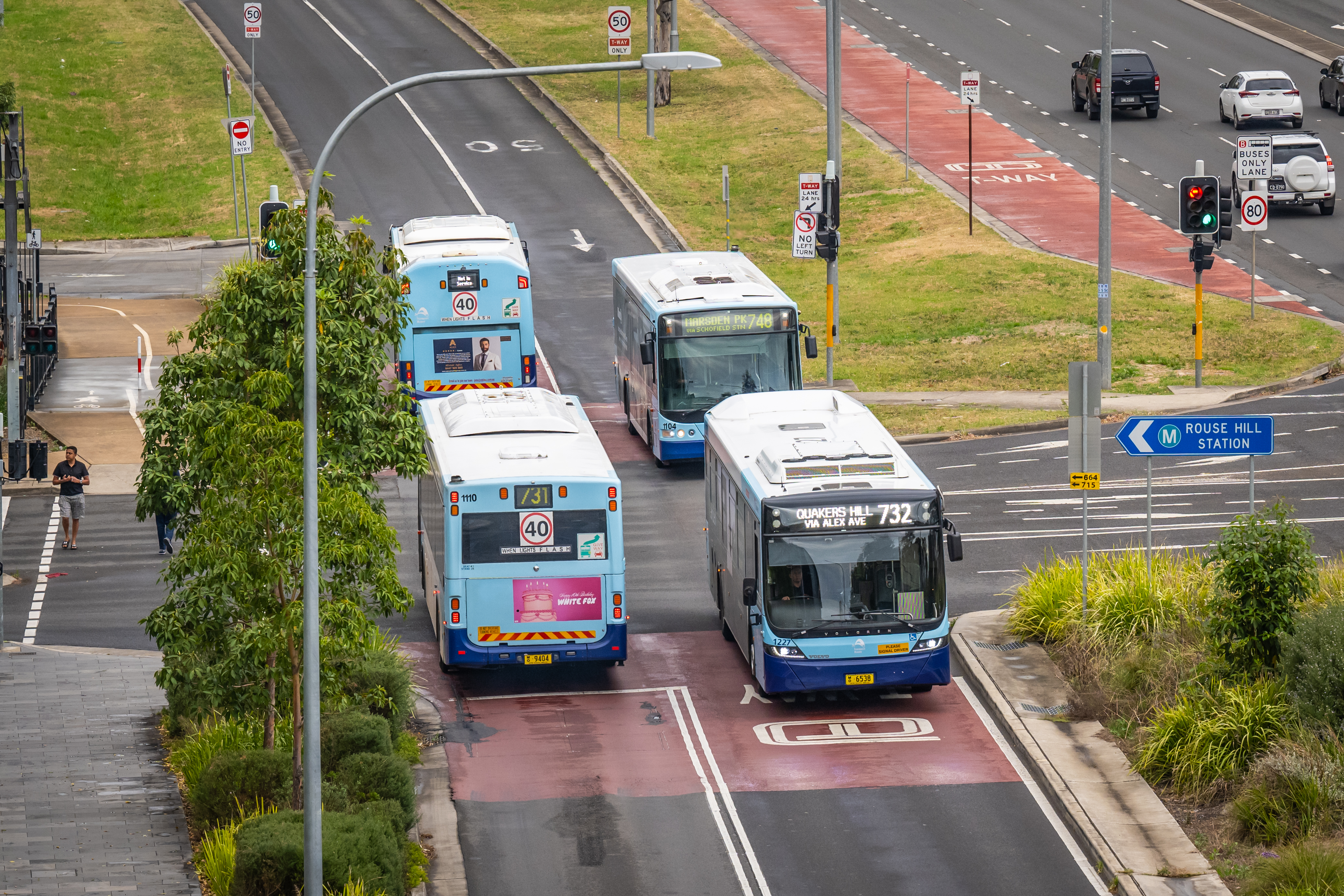
Buses at Rouse Hill station

Busways and Hillsbus operate North-West T-way services. There are many services which traverse the T-Way, either in its entirety or a section of it. The route numbering follows the Sydney Metropolitan Bus Route Numbering System with T-way specific routes prefixed with T until July 2019. (Hillsbus T6x and Busways T7x) On 28 July 2019 the remaining Txx routes were renumbered as three digit numbers.

The following T services use the Parramatta–Rouse Hill T-Way

- T60 Parramatta station – Castle Hill via Crestwood (renumbered 660 28 July 2019)
- T61 Parramatta station – Blacktown station via Kings Langley (renumbered 661 28 July 2019)
- T62 Parramatta station – Castle Hill via Bella Vista and Tuckwell Road (renumbered 662 28 July 2019)
- T63 Parramatta station – Rouse Hill Town Centre via Glenwood and Stanhope Gardens (renumbered 663 28 July 2019)
- T64 Parramatta station – Rouse Hill Town Centre via Norwest Business Park and Kellyville (renumbered 664 28 July 2019)
- T65 Parramatta station – Rouse Hill Town Centre (renumbered 665 28 July 2019)
- T66 Parramatta station – Rouse Hill via Rouse Hill Town Centre (amalgamated with T65 as 665 28 July 2019)

The following T services use the Blacktown–Parklea T-Way

- T61 Blacktown station – Parramatta station via Kings Langley (renumbered 661 28 July 2019)
- T70 Blacktown station – Castle Hill via Glenwood and Norwest Business Park (renumbered 730 26 May 2019)
- T71 Blacktown station – Castle Hill via Stanhope Gardens, Rouse Hill Town Centre and Kellyville (renumbered 731 and curtailed to Blacktown – Rouse Hill Town Centre 26 May 2019)
- T72 Blacktown station – Quakers Hill via Pye Road (renumbered 732 26 May 2019)
- T74 Blacktown station – Riverstone via Stanhope Gardens and The Ponds (renumbered 734 26 May 2019)
- T75 Blacktown station – Riverstone via Rouse Hill (renumbered 735 26 May 2019)

Hillsbus and Busways also operate other routes along the T-way.

== Criticisms ==
The T-way and its operations has come under criticism in several areas. Even before its opening, the Roads & Traffic Authority was criticised for its lack of planning and broken promises on the T-way's construction. Parramatta Council complained during construction that noise walls had not been built next to the homes of residents who lived along the T-way route, causing them distress. The planned cycleway alongside the T-way was not built in its entire length, and included a large deviation which Council complained would erode the cycleway's effectiveness. After the opening of the first stage of the T-way, a local cycle advocacy group identified a large gap in the cycleway, potentially compromising cyclists' safety. Some local residents had their backyards destroyed.

On the opening of the initial route several other problems were raised. Comments were made concerning the initial patronage of the T-way. While the State Government refused to say how many people used the T-way in its first week, a local newspaper discovered that the commuter carpark attracted as few as ten cars a day in the first week of operation. Another local newspaper reported a traffic barrier separating vehicles from the busway at Westmead railway station was causing accidents.

On 12 April 2007, the Roads & Traffic Authority scrapped the bus priority system that would have given buses priority at all at-grade intersections. The decision was criticised as eliminating the main advantage of the T-way and not entice commuters back to public transport. Bus operators expected better patronage once the toll on the Lane Cove Tunnel came into effect.
