= List of schools in Greater Western Sydney =

This is a list of schools in the Greater Western Sydney region of Sydney, the capital of the Australian state of New South Wales. The New South Wales education system traditionally consists of primary schools, which accommodate students from Kindergarten to Year 6 (ages 5–12), and high schools, which accommodate students from Years 7 to 12 (ages 12–18).

== Public schools ==
=== Primary schools ===
Name	Suburb	LGA
Ambarvale Public School	Ambarvale	Campbelltown
Annangrove Public Schools	Annangrove	The Hills
Ashcroft Public School	Ashcroft	Liverpool
Auburn Public School	Auburn	Cumberland
Auburn North Public School	Auburn	Cumberland
Auburn West Public School	Auburn	Cumberland
Austral Public School	Austral	Liverpool
Banks Public School	St Clair	Penrith
Banksia Road Primary School	Greenacre	Canterbury-Bankstown
Bankstown Public School	Bankstown	Canterbury-Bankstown
Bankstown North Public School	Bankstown	Canterbury-Bankstown
Bankstown South Infants School	Bankstown	Canterbury-Bankstown
Bankstown West Public School	Bankstown	Canterbury-Bankstown
Barnier Public School	Quakers Hill	Blacktown
Bass Hill Public School	Bass Hill	Canterbury-Bankstown
Baulkham Hills North Public School	Baulkham Hills	The Hills
Beaumont Hills Public School	Beaumont Hills	The Hills
Bennett Road Public School	Colyton	Penrith
Berala Public School	Berala	Cumberland
Beresford Road Public School	Greystanes	Cumberland
Bert Oldfield Public School	Seven Hills	Blacktown
Bidwill Public School	Bidwill	Blacktown
Bilpin Public School	Bilpin	Hawkesbury
Birrong Public School	Birrong	Canterbury-Bankstown
Blackett Public School	Blackett	Blacktown
Blacktown North Public School	Blacktown	Blacktown
Blacktown South Public School	Blacktown	Blacktown
Blacktown West Public School	Blacktown	Blacktown
Blackwell Public School	St Clair	Penrith
Blairmount Public School	Blairmount	Campbelltown
Blaxcell Street Public School	Granville	Cumberland
Bligh Park Public School	Bligh Park	Hawkesbury
Bonnyrigg Public School	Bonnyrigg	Fairfield
Bonnyrigg Heights Public School	Bonnyrigg Heights	Fairfield
Bossley Park Public School	Bossley Park	Fairfield
Bradbury Public School	Bradbury	Campbelltown
Braddock Public School	Cranebrook	Penrith
Briar Road Public School	Airds	Campbelltown
Bringelly Public School	Bringelly	Liverpool
Burnside Public School	Parramatta North	Parramatta
Busby Public School	Busby	Liverpool
Busby West Public School	Green Valley	Liverpool
Cabramatta Public School	Cabramatta	Fairfield
Cabramatta West Public School	Cabramatta	Fairfield
Caddies Creek Public School	Glenwood	Blacktown
Cambridge Gardens Public School	Cambridge Park	Penrith
Cambridge Park Public School	Cambridge Park	Penrith
Camden Public School	Camden	Camden
Camden South Public School	Camden	Camden
Campbellfield Public School	Minto	Campbelltown
Campbelltown Public School	Campbelltown	Campbelltown
Campbelltown East Public School	Campbelltown	Campbelltown
Campbelltown North Public School	Campbelltown	Campbelltown
Canley Heights Public School	Canley Heights	Fairfield
Canley Vale Public School	Canley Vale	Fairfield
Carlingford Public School	Carlingford	Parramatta
Carlingford West Public School	Carlingford	The Hills
Carramar Public School	Carramar	Fairfield
Cartwright Public School	Cartwright	Liverpool
Castle Hill Public School	Castle Hill	The Hills
Castlereagh Public School	Castlereagh	Penrith
Casula Public School	Casula	Liverpool
Cattai Public School	Cattai	The Hills
Cecil Hills Public School	Cecil Hills	Liverpool
Chester Hill Public School	Chester Hill	Canterbury-Bankstown
Chester Hill North Public School	Chester Hill	Canterbury-Bankstown
Chipping Norton Public School	Chipping Norton	Liverpool
Chullora Public School	Chullora	Canterbury-Bankstown
Clairgate Public School	St Clair	Penrith
Claremont Meadows Public School	Claremont Meadows	Penrith
Claymore Public School	Claymore	Campbelltown
Colo Heights Public School	Colo Heights	Hawkesbury
Colyton Public School	Mount Druitt	Blacktown
Comleroy Road Public School	Kurrajong	Hawkesbury
Condell Park Public School	Bankstown	Canterbury-Bankstown
Crawford Public School	Doonside	Blacktown
Crestwood Public School	Baulkham Hills	The Hills
Curran Public School	Macquarie Fields	Campbelltown
Currans Hill Public School	Currans Hill	Camden
Dalmeny Public School	Prestons	Liverpool
Darcy Road Public School	Wentworthville	Parramatta
Dawson Public School	Dharruk	Blacktown
Doonside Public School	Doonside	Blacktown
Dundas Public School	Dundas	Parramatta
Dural Public School	Dural	The Hills
East Hills Public School	Panania	Canterbury-Bankstown
Eastern Creek Public School	Eastern Creek	Blacktown
Ebenezer Public School	Ebenezer	Hawkesbury
Edensor Park Public School	Edensor Park	Fairfield
Elderslie Public School	Elderslie	Camden
Emerton Public School	Emerton	Blacktown
Emu Heights Public School	Emu Plains	Penrith
Emu Plains Public School	Emu Plains	Penrith
Ermington West Public School	Ermington	Parramatta
Eschol Park Public School	Eschol Park	Campbelltown
Excelsior Public School	Castle Hill	The Hills
Fairfield Public School	Fairfield	Fairfield
Fairfield Heights Public School	Fairfield Heights	Fairfield
Fairfield West Public School	Fairfield West	Fairfield
Fairvale Public School	Fairfield	Fairfield
Freemans Reach Public School	Freemans Reach	Hawkesbury
Georges Hall Public School	Georges Hall	Canterbury-Bankstown
Girraween Public School	Girraween	Cumberland
Glendenning Public School	Glendenning	Blacktown
Glenfield Public School	Glenfield	Campbelltown
Glenhaven Public School	Glenhaven	The Hills
Glenmore Park Public School	Glenmore Park	Penrith
Glenorie Public School	Glenorie	The Hills
Glenwood Public School	Glenfield	Campbelltown
Glossodia Public School	Glossodia	Hawkesbury
Governor Philip King Public School	Edensor Park	Fairfield
The Grange Public School	Minto	Campbelltown
Granville Public School	Granville	Cumberland
Granville East Public School	Granville	Cumberland
Granville South Public School	Guildford	Cumberland
Green Valley Public School	Green Valley	Liverpool
Greenacre Public School	Greenacre	Canterbury-Bankstown
Greenway Park Public School	West Hoxton	Liverpool
Greystanes Public School	Greystanes	Cumberland
Grose View Public School	Grose Vale	Hawkesbury
Guildford Public School	Guildford	Cumberland
Guildford West Public School	Guildford West	Cumberland
Guise Public School	Macquarie Fields	Campbelltown
Hambledon Public School	Quakers Hill	Blacktown
Hammondville Public School	Hammondville	Liverpool
Harrington Park Public School	Harrington Park	Camden
Harrington Street Public School	Cabramatta	Fairfield
Hassall Grove Public School	Hassall Grove	Blacktown
Hebersham Public School	Hebersham	Blacktown
Heckenberg Public School	Heckenberg	Liverpool
Henry Fulton Public School	Cranebrook	Penrith
Hillside Public School	Glenorie	The Hills
Hilltop Road Public School	Wentworthville	Cumberland
Hinchinbrook Public School	Hinchinbrook	Liverpool
Hobartville Public School	Hobartville	Hawkesbury
Holsworthy Public School	Holsworthy	Liverpool
Horsley Park Public School	Horsley Park	Fairfield
Hoxton Park Public School	Hoxton Park	Liverpool
Ingleburn Public School	Ingleburn	Campbelltown
Ironbark Ridge Public School	Rouse Hill	The Hills
James Erskine Public School	Erskine Park	Penrith
Jamisontown Public School	Jamisontown	Penrith
Jasper Road Public School	Baulkham Hills	The Hills
John Palmer Public School	The Ponds	Blacktown
John Warby Public School	Airds	Campbelltown
Kearns Public School	Kearns	Campbelltown
Kellyville Public School	Kellyville	The Hills
Kellyville Ridge Public School	Kellyville Ridge	Blacktown
Kemps Creek Public School	Kemps Creek	Liverpool
Kenthurst Public School	Kenthurst	The Hills
Kentlyn Public School	Kentlyn	Campbelltown
King Park Public School	St Johns Park	Fairfield
Kings Langley Public School	Kings Langley	Blacktown
Kingswood Public School	Kingswood	Penrith
Kingswood Park Public School	Penrith	Penrith
Kingswood South Public School	Kingswood	Penrith
Kurmond Public School	Kurmond	Hawkesbury
Kurrajong Public School	Kurrajong	Hawkesbury
Kurrajong East Public School	East Kurrajong	Hawkesbury
Kurrajong North Public School	Kurrajong Hills	Hawkesbury
Lalor Park Public School	Lalor Park	Blacktown
Lansvale Public School	Canley Vale	Fairfield
Lansvale East Public School	Lansvale	Fairfield
Leonay Public School	Leonay	Penrith
Leppington Public School	Leppington	Camden
Lethbridge Park Public School	Lethbridge Park	Blacktown
Leumeah Public School	Leumeah	Campbelltown
Lidcombe Public School	Lidcombe	Cumberland
Liverpool Public School	Liverpool	Liverpool
Liverpool West Public School	Liverpool	Liverpool
Llandilo Public School	Llandilo	Penrith
Londonderry Public School	Londonderry	Penrith
Luddenham Public School	Luddenham	Liverpool
Lurnea Public School	Lurnea	Liverpool
Lynwood Park Public School	Blacktown	Blacktown
Macquarie Fields Public School	Macquarie Fields	Campbelltown
Madang Avenue Public School	Whalan	Blacktown
Maraylya Public School	Maraylya	Hawkesbury
Marayong Heights Public School	Marayong	Blacktown
Marayong Public School	Blacktown	Blacktown
Marayong South Public School	Blacktown	Blacktown
Maroota Public School	Maroota	The Hills
Marsden Park Public School	Marsden Park	Blacktown
Marsden Road Public School	Liverpool	Liverpool
Matthew Pearce Public School	Baulkham Hills	The Hills
Mawarra Public School	Camden	Camden
The Meadows Public School	Seven Hills	Blacktown
Merrylands Public School	Merrylands	Cumberland
Merrylands East Public School	Merrylands	Cumberland
Metella Road Public School	Toongabbie	Blacktown
Middle Dural Public School	Middle Dural	The Hills
Middleton Grange Public School	Middleton Grange	Liverpool
Miller Public School	Miller	Liverpool
Milperra Public School	Milperra	Canterbury-Bankstown
Minchinbury Public School	Minchinbury	Blacktown
Minto Public School	Minto	Campbelltown
Mount Annan Public School	Mount Annan	Camden
Mount Druitt Public School	Mount Druitt	Blacktown
Mount Lewis Infants School	Greenacre	Canterbury-Bankstown
Mount Pritchard Public School	Mount Pritchard	Fairfield
Mount Pritchard East Public School	Mount Pritchard	Fairfield
Mulgoa Public School	Mulgoa	Penrith
Murray Farm Public School	Carlingford	The Hills
Narellan Public School	Narellan	Camden
Narellan Vale Public School	Narellan Vale	Camden
Newbridge Heights Public School	Chipping Norton	Liverpool
Newington Public School	Newington	Parramatta
North Rocks Public School	North Rocks	The Hills
Northmead Public School	Northmead	Parramatta
Nouméa Public School	Shalvey	Blacktown
Nuwarra Public School	Moorebank	Liverpool
Oakhill Drive Public School	Castle Hill	The Hills
Oakville Public School	Oakville	Hawkesbury
Oatlands Public School	Oatlands	The Hills
Old Guildford Public School	Guildford	Fairfield
Orchard Hills Public School	Orchard Hills	Penrith
Oxley Park Public School	St Marys	Penrith
Padstow Heights Public School	Padstow	Canterbury-Bankstown
Padstow North Public School	Padstow	Canterbury-Bankstown
Padstow Park Public School	Padstow	Canterbury-Bankstown
Panania Public School	Panania	Canterbury-Bankstown
Panania North Public School	Panania	Canterbury-Bankstown
Parklea Public School	Parklea	Blacktown
Parramatta Public School	Parramatta	Parramatta
Parramatta North Public School	Parramatta North	Parramatta
Parramatta West Public School	Parramatta	Parramatta
Pendle Hill Public School	Pendle Hill	Cumberland
Penrith Public School	Penrith	Penrith
Penrith South Public School	South Penrith	Penrith
Picnic Point Public School	Picnic Point	Canterbury-Bankstown
Pitt Town Public School	Pitt Town	Hawkesbury
Plumpton Public School	Plumpton	Blacktown
Prairievale Public School	Bossley Park	Fairfield
Prestons Public School	Prestons	Liverpool
Punchbowl Public School	Punchbowl	Canterbury-Bankstown
Quakers Hill Public School	Quakers Hill	Blacktown
Quakers Hill East Public School	Acacia Gardens	Blacktown
Regents Park Public School	Regents Park	Canterbury-Bankstown
Regentville Public School	Regentville	Penrith
Revesby Public School	Revesby	Canterbury-Bankstown
Revesby South Public School	Revesby	Canterbury-Bankstown
Richmond North Public School	North Richmond	Hawkesbury
Richmond Public School	Richmond	Hawkesbury
Ringrose Public School	Greystanes	Cumberland
Riverstone Public School	Riverstone	Blacktown
Robert Townson Public School	Raby	Campbelltown
Rooty Hill Public School	Rooty Hill	Blacktown
Ropes Crossing Public School	Ropes Crossing	Blacktown
Rosehill Public School	Rosehill	Parramatta
Rosemeadow Public School	Rosemeadow	Campbelltown
Rossmore Public School	Rossmore	Liverpool
Rouse Hill Public School	Rouse Hill	The Hills
Ruse Public School	Ruse	Campbelltown
Rydalmere Public School	Rydalmere	Parramatta
Rydalmere East Public School	Ermington	Parramatta
Sackville Street Public School	Ingleburn	Campbelltown
Sadleir Public School	Sadleir	Liverpool
Samuel Gilbert Public School	Castle Hill	The Hills
Samuel Terry Public School	Cranebrook	Penrith
Sarah Redfern Public School	Minto	Campbelltown
Schofields Public School	Schofields	Blacktown
Sefton Infants School	Sefton	Canterbury-Bankstown
Seven Hills Public School	Seven Hills	Blacktown
Seven Hills North Public School	Seven Hills	Blacktown
Seven Hills West Public School	Seven Hills	Blacktown
Shalvey Public School	Shalvey	Blacktown
Shelley Public School	Blacktown	Blacktown
Sherwood Grange Public School	Merrylands	Cumberland
Sherwood Ridge Public School	Kellyville	The Hills
Smithfield Public School	Smithfield	Fairfield
Smithfield West Public School	Wetherill Park	Fairfield
St Andrews Public School	St Andrews	Campbelltown
St Clair Public School	St Clair	Penrith
St Helens Park Public School	St Helens Park	Campbelltown
St Johns Park Public School	St Johns Park	Fairfield
St Marys Public School	St Marys	Penrith
St Marys North Public School	North St Marys	Penrith
St Marys South Public School	St Marys	Penrith
Surveyors Creek Public School	Glenmore Park	Penrith
Telopea Public School	Telopea	Parramatta
Thomas Acres Public School	Ambarvale	Campbelltown
Toongabbie Public School	Toongabbie	Parramatta
Toongabbie East Public School	Wentworthville	Parramatta
Toongabbie West Public School	Toongabbie	Parramatta
Tower Street Public School	Panania	Canterbury-Bankstown
Tregear Public School	Tregear	Blacktown
Vardys Road Public School	Seven Hills	Blacktown
Villawood East Public School	Villawood	Canterbury-Bankstown
Villawood North Public School	Fairfield East	Fairfield
Vineyard Public School	Vineyard	Blacktown
Wallacia Public School	Wallacia	Penrith
Walters Road Public School	Blacktown	Blacktown
Warwick Farm Public School	Warwick Farm	Liverpool
Wattawa Heights Public School	Bankstown	Canterbury-Bankstown
Wattle Grove Public School	Wattle Grove	Liverpool
Wentworthville Public School	Wentworthville	Cumberland
Werrington County Public School	Werrington County	Penrith
Werrington Public School	Werrington	Penrith
Westmead Public School	Westmead	Cumberland
Whalan Public School	Whalan	Blacktown
Widemere Public School	Greystanes	Cumberland
Wilberforce Public School	Wilberforce	Hawkesbury
Wiley Park Public School	Wiley Park	Canterbury-Bankstown
William Dean Public School	Dean Park	Blacktown
William Stimson Public School	Wetherill Park	Fairfield
Willmot Public School	Willmot	Blacktown
Windsor Public School	Windsor	Hawkesbury
Windsor Park Public School	South Windsor	Hawkesbury
Windsor South Public School	South Windsor	Hawkesbury
Winston Heights Public School	Winston Hills	Parramatta
Winston Hills Public School	Winston Hills	Parramatta
Woodland Road Public School	St Helens Park	Campbelltown
Yagoona Public School	Yagoona	Canterbury-Bankstown
Yates Avenue Public School	Dundas Valley	Parramatta
Yennora Public School	Yennora	Fairfield
York Public School	South Penrith	Penrith

=== High schools ===
In New South Wales, a high school generally covers Years 7 to 12 in the education system, and a central or community school, intended to provide comprehensive education in a rural district, covers Kindergarten to Year 12. An additional class of high schools has emerged in recent years as a result of amalgamations which have produced multi-campus colleges consisting of Junior and Senior campuses.

While most schools are comprehensive and take in all students of high school age living within its defined school boundaries, some schools are either specialist in a given key learning area, or selective in that they set examinations or other performance criteria for entrance.

Name	Suburb	LGA
Airds High School	Airds	Campbelltown
Ambarvale High School	Ambarvale	Campbelltown
Arthur Phillip High School	Parramatta	Parramatta
Ashcroft High School	Ashcroft	Liverpool
Auburn Girls High School	Auburn	Cumberland
Bankstown Girls High School	Bankstown	Canterbury-Bankstown
Bankstown Senior College	Bankstown	Canterbury-Bankstown
Bass High School	Bass Hill	Canterbury-Bankstown
Baulkham Hills High School	Baulkham Hills	The Hills
Bensley Selective High School	Long Point	Campbelltown
Birrong Boys High School	Birrong	Canterbury-Bankstown
Birrong Girls High School	Birrong	Canterbury-Bankstown
Blacktown Boys High School	Blacktown	Blacktown
Blacktown Girls High School	Blacktown	Blacktown
Bonnyrigg High School	Bonnyrigg	Fairfield
Bossley Park High School	Bossley Park	Fairfield
Cabramatta High School	Cabramatta	Fairfield
Cambridge Park High School	Cambridge Park	Penrith
Camden High School	Camden	Camden
Campbelltown Performing Arts High School	Campbelltown	Campbelltown
Canley Vale High School	Canley Vale	Fairfield
Castle Hill High School	Castle Hill	The Hills
Casula High School	Casula	Liverpool
Cecil Hills High School	Cecil Hills	Liverpool
Chester Hill High School	Chester Hill	Canterbury-Bankstown
Chifley College (Bidwill Campus)	Bidwill	Blacktown
Chifley College (Dunheved Campus)	North St Marys	Penrith
Chifley College (Mount Druitt Campus)	Mount Druitt	Blacktown
Chifley College (Shalvey Campus)	Shalvey	Blacktown
Chifley College Senior Campus	Mount Druitt	Blacktown
Colo High School	North Richmond	Hawkesbury
Colyton High School	Colyton	Penrith
Condell Park High School	Condell Park	Canterbury-Bankstown
Cranebrook High School	Cranebrook	Penrith
Crestwood High School	Baulkham Hills	The Hills
Cumberland High School	Carlingford	The Hills
Doonside Technology High School	Doonside	Blacktown
Eagle Vale High School	Eagle Vale	Campbelltown
East Hills Boys High School	Panania	Canterbury-Bankstown
East Hills Girls Technology High School	Panania	Canterbury-Bankstown
Elderslie High School	Narellan	Camden
Elizabeth Macarthur High School	Narellan	Camden
Erskine Park High School	Erskine Park	Penrith
Evans High School	Blacktown	Blacktown
Fairfield High School	Fairfield	Fairfield
Fairvale High School	Fairfield West	Fairfield
Girraween High School	Girraween	Cumberland
Glenmore Park High School	Glenmore Park	Penrith
Glenwood High School	Glenwood	Blacktown
Granville Boys High School	Granville	Cumberland
Granville South Creative and Performing Arts High School	Guildford	Cumberland
Greystanes High School	Greystanes	Cumberland
Hawkesbury High School	Freemans Reach	Hawkesbury
The Hills Sports High School	Seven Hills	Blacktown
Holroyd High School	Greystanes	Cumberland
Holsworthy High School	Holsworthy	Liverpool
Hoxton Park High School	Hinchinbrook	Liverpool
Hurlstone Agricultural High School	Glenfield	Campbelltown
Ingleburn High School	Ingleburn	Campbelltown
James Busby High School	Green Valley	Liverpool
James Meehan High School	Macquarie Fields	Campbelltown
James Ruse Agricultural High School	Carlingford	The Hills
Jamison High School	South Penrith	Penrith
John Edmondson High School	Horningsea Park	Liverpool
Kellyville High School	Kellyville	The Hills
Kingswood High School	Kingswood	Penrith
Leumeah High School	Leumeah	Campbelltown
Liverpool Boys High School	Liverpool	Liverpool
Liverpool Girls High School	Liverpool	Liverpool
Lurnea High School	Lurnea	Liverpool
Macarthur Girls High School	Parramatta	Parramatta
Macquarie Fields High School	Macquarie Fields	Campbelltown
Merrylands High School	Merrylands	Cumberland
Miller Technology High School	Miller	Liverpool
Mitchell High School	Blacktown	Blacktown
Model Farms High School	Baulkham Hills	The Hills
Moorebank High School	Moorebank	Liverpool
Mount Annan High School	Mount Annan	Camden
Muirfield High School	North Rocks	Parramatta
Nepean Creative and Performing Arts High School	Emu Plains	Penrith
Northmead Creative and Performing Arts High School	Northmead	The Hills
Parramatta High School	Parramatta	Parramatta
Pendle Hill High School	Pendle Hill	Parramatta
Penrith Selective High School	Penrith	Penrith
Picnic Point High School	Panania	Canterbury-Bankstown
Plumpton High School	Plumpton	Blacktown
Prairiewood High School	Wetherill Park	Fairfield
Punchbowl Boys High School	Punchbowl	Canterbury-Bankstown
Quakers Hill High School	Quakers Hill	Blacktown
Richmond High School	Richmond	Hawkesbury
Rooty Hill High School	Rooty Hill	Blacktown
Riverstone High School	Riverstone	Blacktown
Robert Townson High School	Raby	Campbelltown
Rouse Hill High School	Rouse Hill	The Hills
Sarah Redfern High School	Minto	Campbelltown
Sefton High School	Sefton	Canterbury-Bankstown
Seven Hills High School	Seven Hills	Blacktown
Sir Joseph Banks High School	Revesby	Canterbury-Bankstown
St Johns Park High School	St Johns Park	Fairfield
St Marys Senior High School	St Marys	Penrith
Thomas Reddall High School	Ambarvale	Campbelltown
Westfields Sports High School	Fairfield West	Fairfield
Wiley Park Girls High School	Punchbowl	Canterbury-Bankstown
Windsor High School	Mulgrave	Hawkesbury
Wyndham College	Quakers Hill	Blacktown

=== Special schools ===
Special schools are public schools designed for children or youth with chronic disabilities or who for other reasons cannot be accommodated in the comprehensive school system.

Name	Suburb	LGA	Opened
Ajuga School	Glenfield	Campbelltown	1992
Bankstown Hospital School	Bankstown	Bankstown	1966
Beverley Park School	Campbelltown	Campbelltown	1941
Broderick Gillawarna School	Revesby	Bankstown	1954
Campbell House School	Glenfield	Campbelltown	1990
Caroline Chisholm School	Padstow	Bankstown	1966
Casuarina School	Riverstone	Blacktown	2001
The Hospital School at Westmead	Westmead	Parramatta	1996
Coreen School	Blacktown	Blacktown	1970
Dorchester School	Airds	Campbelltown	1973
Fowler Road School	Merrylands	Holroyd	1980
Glenfield Park School	Glenfield	Campbelltown	1927
Halinda School	Whalan	Blacktown	1974
The Hills School	Northmead	The Hills	1978
Holroyd School	Merrylands	Holroyd	1964
Karningul School	Regents Park	Auburn	2001
Kurrambee School	Werrington	Penrith	1965
Lawrence Hargrave School	Warwick Farm	Liverpool	1970
Les Powell School	Mount Pritchard	Fairfield	1985
Liverpool Hospital School	Liverpool	Liverpool	1973
Lomandra School	Campbelltown	Campbelltown	1998
Mainsbridge School	Warwick Farm	Liverpool	1964
Mary Brooksbank School	Rosemeadow	Campbelltown	1987
Niland School	Blackett	Blacktown	1972
Palm Avenue School	Westmead	Parramatta	1972
Passfield Park School	Minto	Campbelltown	1980
Penrith Valley School	Werrington	Penrith	2007
Plumpton House School	Plumpton	Blacktown	1998
Putland School	Werrington	Penrith	1980
Redbank School	Westmead	Parramatta	1976
Rowland Hassall School	Chester Hill	Canterbury-Bankstown	2017
Tallowood School	Beaumont Hills	The Hills	2004
Verona School	Fairfield East	Fairfield	2001
Waratah Centre	Telopea	Parramatta	2001
William Rose School	Seven Hills	Blacktown	1962
Yandelora School	Narellan	Camden	2019

=== Defunct government schools ===
Name	Suburb	LGA	Opened	Closed
Agnes Banks Public School	Agnes Banks	Hawkesbury	1875	1970
Bankstown Boys High School	Bankstown	Bankstown	1963	1991
Baulkham Hills Public School	Baulkham Hills	The Hills	1868	1998
Bensley Public School	Macquarie Fields	Campbelltown	1976	1978
Blacktown High School	Blacktown	Blacktown	1956	1958
Blacktown Public School	Blacktown	Blacktown	1871	1990
Blaxlands Ridge Public School	Blaxlands Ridge	Hawkesbury	1892	1977
Camden Park Public School	Camden Park	Camden	1879	1887
Campbelltown South Public School	Campbelltown	Campbelltown	1914	1937
Castlereagh Upper Public School	Upper Castlereagh	Penrith	1879	1975
Colo Central Public School	Central Colo	Hawkesbury	1904	1934
Colo Upper Public School	Upper Colo	Hawkesbury	1907	1947
Dundas Public School	Dundas	Parramatta	1869	1957
Erskine Park Public School	Erskine Park	Penrith	1879	1971
Fairfield Boys High School	Fairfield	Fairfield	1954	1980
Fairfield Girls High School	Fairfield	Fairfield	1955	1980
Farrar Public School for the Deaf	Croydon Park	Campise	1946	2000
Fred Birks Special School	Westmead	Parramatta	1930	1995
Grose Vale Public School	Grose Vale	Hawkesbury	1871	1976
Grose Wold Public School	Grose Vale	Hawkesbury	1902	1976
Lower Portland Public School	Lower Portland	The Hills	1867	1996
Lynwood Hall Special School	Guildford	Holroyd	1939	1976
Macquarie Boys High School	Parramatta North	Parramatta	1944	2010
Minto East Public School	Minto	Campbelltown	1898	1948
Nepean Special School	Penrith	Penrith	1962	1991
North Rocks School for the Deaf	North Rocks	The Hills	1962	1998
Northcott Special School	Parramatta North	Parramatta	1954	1989
Parramatta Girls Training School	Parramatta	Parramatta	1887	1974
Parramatta Hospital School	Parramatta	Parramatta	1962	1979
Prospect Public School	Prospect	Blacktown	1867	1988
Rosehill Girls Junior High School	Rosehill	Parramatta	1966	1971
Sackville North Public School	Sackville North	The Hills	1868	1972
Scheyville Holding Centre	Scheyville	Hawkesbury	1950	1965
Tennyson Public School	Tennyson	Hawkesbury	1895	1951
Wedderburn Public School	Wedderburn	Campbelltown	1896	1976
Werombi Road School	Camden	Camden	1973	1983
Werrington Park Special School	Werrington	Penrith	1960	1980
Westmead Boys Junior High School	Westmead	Parramatta	1952	1969
Westmead Hospital School	Westmead	Parramatta	1980	1995

== Independent schools ==
=== Catholic primary schools ===
In New South Wales, Catholic primary schools are usually (but not always) linked to a parish. Prior to the 1970s, most schools were founded by religious institutes, but with the decrease in membership of these institutes, together with major reforms inside the church, lay teachers and administrators began to take over the schools, a process which completed by approximately 1995. The Catholic Education Offices (CEO), located in each of the Parramatta and Wollongong Dioceses and the Sydney Archdiocese of the Church, are responsible for coordinating administration, curriculum and policy across the Catholic school system. Preference for enrolment is given to Catholic students from the parish or local area, although non-Catholic students are admitted if room is available.

Name	Suburb	LGA
All Saints' Catholic College	Liverpool	Liverpool
Bethany Catholic Primary School	Glenmore Park	Penrith
Chisholm Catholic Primary School	South Windsor	Hawkesbury
Christ the King Primary School	North Rocks	The Hills
Corpus Christi Primary School	Cranebrook	Penrith
Good Shepherd Primary School	Hoxton Park	Liverpool
Good Shepherd Primary School	Plumpton	Blacktown
Holy Cross Primary School	Glenwood	Blacktown
Holy Family Catholic Primary School	Ingleburn	Campbelltown
Holy Family Primary School	Emerton	Blacktown
Holy Family Primary School	Luddenham	Penrith
Holy Family Primary School	South Granville	Parramatta
Holy Saviour School	Greenacre	Bankstown
Holy Spirit Primary School	Horningsea Park	Liverpool
Holy Spirit Primary School	St Clair	Penrith
Holy Trinity Primary School	Granville	Parramatta
Immaculate Heart of Mary School	Sefton	Bankstown
John the Baptist Primary School	Bonnyrigg Heights	Fairfield
John XXIII Catholic Primary School	Stanhope Gardens	Blacktown
Marion Primary School	Horsley Park	Fairfield
Mary Immaculate Parish Primary School	Eagle Vale	Campbelltown
Mary Immaculate Primary School	Bossley Park	Fairfield
Mary Immaculate Primary School	Quakers Hill	Blacktown
Mary Mackillop Primary School	South Penrith	Penrith
Mother Teresa Primary School	Westmead	Holroyd
Our Lady Help of Christians Primary School	Rosemeadow	Campbelltown
Our Lady of Lourdes Primary School	Baulkham Hills	The Hills
Our Lady of Lourdes Primary School	Seven Hills	Blacktown
Our Lady of Mount Carmel Primary School	Wentworthville	Holroyd
Our Lady of Mount Carmel School	Bonnyrigg	Fairfield
Our Lady of the Angels Primary School	Rouse Hill	The Hills
Our Lady of the Rosary Primary School	Fairfield	Fairfield
Our Lady of the Rosary Primary School	Kellyville	The Hills
Our Lady of the Rosary Primary School	St Marys	Penrith
Our Lady of the Way Primary School	Emu Plains	Penrith
Our Lady Queen of Peace Primary School	Greystanes	Holroyd
Sacred Heart Primary School	Mount Druitt	Blacktown
Sacred Heart Primary School	Westmead	Holroyd
Sacred Heart School	Cabramatta	Fairfield
Sacred Heart School	Villawood	Bankstown
St Aidan's Primary School	Rooty Hill	Blacktown
St Andrew's Primary School	Marayong	Blacktown
St Angela's Primary School	Castle Hill	The Hills
St Anthony's Primary School	Girraween	Holroyd
St Bernadette's Primary School	Castle Hill	The Hills
St Bernadette's Primary School	Dundas	Parramatta
St Bernadette's Primary School	Lalor Park	Blacktown
St Brendan's School	Bankstown	Bankstown
St Catherine of Siena Primary School	Prestons	Liverpool
St Christopher's Primary School	Holsworthy	Liverpool
St Christopher's School	Panania	Bankstown
St Clare's Catholic Primary School	Narellan Vale	Camden
St Felix's Primary School	Bankstown	Bankstown
St Francis of Assisi Primary School	Glendenning	Blacktown
St Francis Xavier's School	Lurnea	Liverpool
St Gerard's Catholic Primary School	Carlingford	Hornsby
St Gertrude's Primary School	Smithfield	Fairfield
St Joachim's Primary School	Lidcombe	Auburn
St John the Evangelist School	Campbelltown	Campbelltown
St John Vianney's Primary School	Doonside	Blacktown
St John Vianney's School	Greenacre	Bankstown
St John's Primary School	Auburn	Auburn
St John's Primary School	Riverstone	Blacktown
St Joseph the Worker Primary School	Auburn	Auburn
St Joseph's Primary School	Kingswood	Penrith
St Joseph's Primary School	Moorebank	Liverpool
St Joseph's Primary School	Schofields	Blacktown
St Luke's School	Revesby	Bankstown
St Madeleine's Primary School	Kenthurst	The Hills
St Margaret Mary's Primary School	Merrylands	Holroyd
St Mary's Primary School	Georges Hall	Bankstown
St Mary's Primary School	Rydalmere	Parramatta
St Matthew's Primary School	Windsor	Hawkesbury
St Michael's Primary School	Blacktown	Blacktown
St Michael's School	Baulkham Hills	The Hills
St Monica's Primary School	North Parramatta	Parramatta
St Monica's Primary School	Richmond	Hawkesbury
St Nicholas of Myra Primary School	Penrith	Penrith
St Oliver's Primary School	Harris Park	Parramatta
St Patrick's Primary School	Blacktown	Blacktown
St Patrick's Primary School	Guildford	Holroyd
St Patrick's Primary School	Parramatta	Parramatta
St Paul the Apostle Primary School	Winston Hills	Parramatta
St Paul's Catholic Primary School	Camden	Camden
St Peter Chanel Primary School	Regents Park	Auburn
St Therese Primary School	Padstow	Bankstown
St Therese Catholic Primary School	Sadleir	Liverpool
St Thomas More Catholic Primary School	Ruse	Campbelltown
Trinity Catholic Primary School	Kemps Creek	Liverpool

=== Catholic high schools ===
Only systemic Catholic schools (those which come under the Diocese's control) are listed. Other Catholic schools are listed under "independent schools".

Name	Suburb	LGA
All Saints Catholic Boys College	Liverpool	Liverpool
All Saints Catholic Girls College	Liverpool	Liverpool
All Saints Catholic Senior College	Casula	Liverpool
Bede Polding College	South Windsor	Hawkesbury
Caroline Chisholm College	Glenmore Park	Penrith
Catherine McAuley Catholic High School	Westmead	Parramatta
Cerdon College	Merrylands West	Holroyd
Clancy Catholic College	West Hoxton	Liverpool
De La Salle College	Revesby Heights	Bankstown
Delany College	Granville	Parramatta
Emmaus Catholic College	Kemps Creek	Liverpool
Freeman Catholic College	Bonnyrigg Heights	Fairfield
Gilroy College	Castle Hill	The Hills
Good Samaritan Catholic College	Hinchinbrook	Liverpool
John Therry Catholic High School	Rosemeadow	Campbelltown
LaSalle Catholic College	Bankstown	Bankstown
Loyola Senior High School	Mount Druitt	Blacktown
Magdalene Catholic High School	Narellan	Camden
Mary MacKillop College	Wakeley	Fairfield
McCarthy Catholic College	Emu Plains	Penrith
Mount Carmel High School	Varroville	Campbelltown
Mount Saint Joseph, Milperra	Milperra	Bankstown
Nagle College	Blacktown	Blacktown
Parramatta Marist High School	Westmead	Parramatta
Patrician Brothers' College, Blacktown	Blacktown	Blacktown
Patrician Brothers' College, Fairfield	Fairfield	Fairfield
St Agnes Catholic High School	Rooty Hill	Blacktown
St Andrews College	Marayong	Blacktown
St Benedict's Catholic College	Camden	Camden
St Clare's Catholic High School	Hassall Grove	Blacktown
St Mark's Catholic College	Stanhope Gardens	Blacktown
St Patrick's Marist College	Dundas	Parramatta
St Pauls Catholic College	Greystanes	Holroyd
St John Paul II Catholic College	Schofields	Blacktown
Trinity Catholic College, Auburn	Auburn	Auburn
Xavier College	Llandilo	Penrith

=== Independent schools ===
Name	Suburb	LGA
Al Amanah College (Bankstown Campus)	Bankstown	Bankstown
Al Amanah College (Liverpool Campus)	Liverpool	Liverpool
Al-Faisal College	Auburn	Auburn
Al Noori Muslim School	Greenacre	Bankstown
Al Sadiq College	Greenacre	Bankstown
Al Sadiq College (Junior Campus)	Yagoona	Bankstown
Alpha Omega Senior College	Auburn	Auburn
Arndell Anglican College	Oakville	Hawkesbury
Australian Christian College – Marsden Park	Marsden Park	Blacktown
The Australian International Performing Arts High School	Harris Park	Parramatta
Australian Islamic College of Sydney	Mount Druitt	Blacktown
Bellfield College	Rossmore	Liverpool
Bethany Christian School	Prospect	Blacktown
Bethel Christian School	Mount Druitt	Blacktown
Bob Hughes Christian School	Chester Hill	Bankstown
Broughton Anglican College	Menangle Park	Camden
Calvary Chapel Christian School	Georges Hall	Bankstown
Condell Park Christian School	Condell Park	Bankstown
Georges River Grammar School	Georges Hall	Bankstown
Green Valley Islamic College	Green Valley	Liverpool
Greenacre Baptist Christian Community School	Greenacre	Bankstown
Hawkesbury Independent School	Kurrajong	Hawkesbury
Heritage College Sydney	Kemps Creek	Liverpool
Hills Adventist College	Castle Hill	The Hills
The Hills Grammar School	Kenthurst	The Hills
Hope Christian School	Narellan	Camden
Iqra Grammar College	Minto	Campbelltown
The King's School	North Parramatta	The Hills
Kuyper Christian School	North Richmond	Hawkesbury
The Lakes Christian College	Castlereagh	Penrith
Lorien Novalis School	Dural	The Hills
Macarthur Adventist College	Macquarie Fields	Campbelltown
Macarthur Anglican School	Cobbitty	Camden
Malek Fahd Islamic School	Greenacre	Bankstown
Mamre Anglican School	Kemps Creek	Penrith
Mar Narsai Assyrian College	Edensor Park	Fairfield
Marian Catholic College	Kenthurst	The Hills
Montgrove College	Orchard Hills	Penrith
Mount Annan Christian College	Mount Annan	Camden
Mountain View Adventist College	Doonside	Blacktown
Nepean Christian School	Mulgoa	Penrith
Norwest Christian College	Riverstone	Blacktown
Oakhill College	Castle Hill	Hornsby
OneSchool Global NSW – Sydney	Oatlands	Parramatta
Our Lady of Lebanon College	Harris Park	Parramatta
Our Lady of Mercy College, Parramatta	Parramatta	Parramatta
Pal College	Cabramatta	Fairfield
Penrith Anglican College	Orchard Hills	Penrith
Penrith Christian School	Orchard Hills	Penrith
Qibla College	Leumeah	Campbelltown
Redeemer Baptist School	North Parramatta	The Hills
Regents Park Christian School	Regents Park	Auburn
Richard Johnson Anglican School	Oakhurst	Blacktown
Rouse Hill Anglican College	Rouse Hill	Blacktown
Sherwood Hills Christian School	Bradbury	Campbelltown
St Bishoy Coptic Orthodox College	Mount Druitt	Blacktown
St Charbel's College	Punchbowl	Bankstown
St Dominic's College	Kingswood	Penrith
St Euphemia College	Bankstown	Bankstown
St Gregory's College	Gregory Hills	Camden
St Hurmizd Assyrian Primary School	Greenfield Park	Fairfield
St Mark's Coptic Orthodox College	Wattle Grove	Liverpool
St Patrick's College	Campbelltown	Campbelltown
St Paul's Grammar School	Cranebrook	Penrith
St Peter's Anglican Primary School	Campbelltown	Campbelltown
Sule College	Prestons	Liverpool
Sule College (Auburn Campus)	Auburn	Auburn
Sydney Adventist College (Auburn Campus)	Auburn	Auburn
Tara Anglican School for Girls	North Parramatta	The Hills
Thomas Hassall Anglican College	Hoxton Park	Liverpool
Toongabbie Christian School	Toongabbie	Parramatta
Tyndale Christian School	Blacktown	Blacktown
Unity Grammar College	Austral	Liverpool
Westmead Christian Grammar School	Westmead	Holroyd
William Carey Christian School	Prestons	Liverpool
William Clarke College	Kellyville	The Hills

=== Special-purpose independent schools ===
The Government of New South Wales recognises a registration category known as "Prescribed Non-Government Schools" which serve the same purposes as Special Schools but are independently operated.

Name	Suburb	LGA
Anglican Technical College Western Sydney	Glenwood	Blacktown
Aspect Macarthur School	Cobbitty	Camden
Aspect Western Sydney School	Wetherill Park	Fairfield
Blacktown Youth College	Bidwill	Blacktown
Mater Dei Special School	Camden	Camden
Obley Education Centre	St Marys	Penrith
Odyssey House	Eagle Vale	Campbelltown
RIDBC Garfield Barwick School	North Parramatta	The Hills
RIDBC Alice Betteridge School	North Rocks	The Hills
RIDBC Thomas Pattison School	North Rocks	The Hills
St Gabriel's School	Castle Hill	The Hills
Woodbury Autism Education and Research	Baulkham Hills	The Hills

=== Defunct independent schools ===
Name	Suburb	LGA	Category	Opened	Closed
American International School of Sydney	Carlingford	Parramatta	Independent	1999	2009
Benedict Senior College	Auburn	Auburn	Catholic	1942	1994
Holy Family High School	Marayong	Blacktown	Catholic	1967	1997
John Paul II Senior High School	Marayong	Blacktown	Catholic	1981	1997
South Granville Christian Community School	South Granville	Parramatta	Baptist	1982 or 1984	2004
St Gregory's Armenian School	Beaumont Hills	The Hills	Armenian	1984	2010
St John's Girls High School	Auburn	Auburn	Catholic	1893	1994
St Peter Chanel High School	Regents Park	Auburn	Catholic	1964	1994

== See also ==
- Lists of schools in Australia
