= Neoblie =

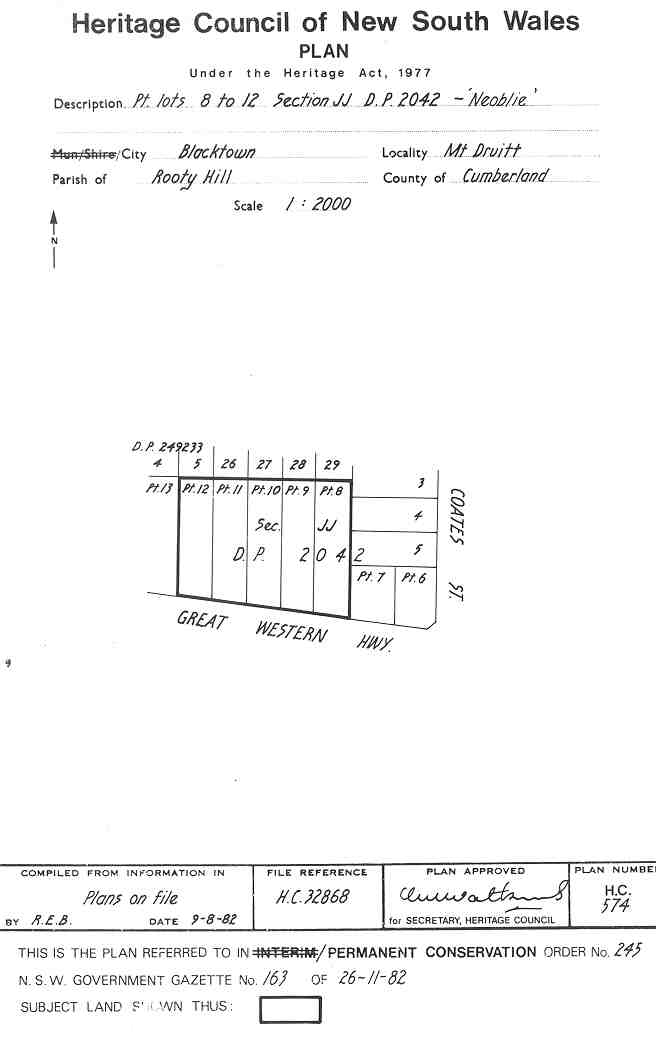
- Heritage boundaries

- Location within Sydney
- 33°46′45″S 150°48′59″E
- Location: Great Western Highway, Mount Druitt, City of Blacktown, New South Wales, Australia

History
- Built: c. 1884

Site notes
- Owner: Blacktown City Council

New South Wales Heritage Register
- Official name: Neoblie
- Type: state heritage (built)
- Designated: 2 April 1999
- Reference no.: 245
- Type: House
- Category: Residential buildings (private)
- Builders: Charles or James Paull

Neoblie is a heritage-listed former residence at Great Western Highway, Mount Druitt, City of Blacktown, New South Wales, Australia. It was built by Charles or James Paull. The property is owned by Blacktown City Council. It was added to the New South Wales State Heritage Register on 2 April 1999.

== History ==
It is unclear whether Neoblie was built by Charles Paull or his son, James. Charles Paull owned and operated the Golden Sheaf Inn at Colyton and the southern part of the Druitt Estate (part of Major George Druitt's grant), including the land which Neoblie is located on. While some believe the residence was built by Charles, others say that it was built c. 1884 by his son, James.

Neoblie was bought by the Lix family c. 1900. It appears that there had been at least one other family in ownership of the property between these two owners. The Lix's were big entertainer's and the house was constantly filled with visitors, suggesting that it was likely to be a well visited location by individuals known to Gustavius, including those met on his worldwide travels.

Gustavius Lix was a well travelled gentleman, partly due to his position as secretary of various international expositions held in Paris and London. He had originally come to Australia from France to assist with the exposition in Sydney in 1879-80s. Descendants of the Lix family, including the Ryans, inhabited the cottage until the early 1970s when it was sold to the State Planning Authority. It was given to Blacktown City Council by the state government in the 1990s.

Neoblie was a functioning popular residence at an important time in Mt Druitt, where not only were community activities important....such as church and school activities, but also close to the first live hare coursing track in Australia which brought people from many areas to the locality.

Minor improvement works were undertaken in the 1990s including verandah improvements, attempts to stabilise eastern exterior wall, installation of a perimeter membrane to stabilise effects of ground movement.

In 2009, the City of Blacktown received a government grant to restore the property and renovated it back to its original condition. Part of the renovations included removing the bathroom and rear verandah enclosures. The property continued to sit vacant following the renovations.

In September 2014, the City of Blacktown reported that they had received two expressions of interest in leasing the property; however, in May 2015 the Mount Druitt Historical Society took a heritage tour through the site, noting that it remained fenced off and that the tour was a "rare opportunity" to access the interior.

The building's local heritage listing, updated after the renovations, notes that the house continues to "require services and amenities to enable ongoing use" and notes that "there is no formal access to the site, and no access to the site from the Great Western Highway. In October 2015, the state government gave open space surrounding Neoblie to the City of Blacktown. The council had previously announced in July that the then-foreshadowed move would "allow it to look at options for providing a safer entry and exit route to the property".

Today numerous residents keep a watchful eye over the property due to its interest for them.

== Description ==
A single storey symmetrical sandstock brick cottage with steep pyramidal hipped roof and verandah on all sides, located on a hill and is highly visible from the Great Western Highway.

The original part of the house has four rooms with central hallway and fireplaces in each room leading to one of two chimneys. The front entry door is flanked by a pair of French doors opening onto the verandah. The exterior walls are penetrated at regular intervals by high French doors front entry door is flanked by a pair of French doors opening onto the verandah.

The northern verandah had been filled in to create laundry, bathroom and kitchen, but these alterations were demolished in 2010.

It was described as being in poor-fair condition and continuing to deteriorate by the State Heritage Register, possibly at the time of its listing in 1999; however, this appears to predate the post-2009 renovation by the City of Blacktown.

Neoblie has a high degree of intactness, with no major changes having been made to the overall structure. The northern verandah has been filled in to create laundry, bathroom and kitchen at an unknown date.

== Heritage listing ==
Neoblie is an excellent example of its style, surviving largely intact. It was located close to a major road which would have given it landmark qualities for travellers in the late nineteenth century as it does now. It has associations with local families, as well as Gustavius Lix who was a well travelled man and likely entertained many individuals he met on his travels. Neoblie is located in an area that saw the development of Mt Druitt as an important place due to its proximity to the road, schools, general facilities and the first live hare coursing track in Australia

Neoblie was listed on the New South Wales State Heritage Register on 2 April 1999 having satisfied the following criteria.

The place is important in demonstrating the course, or pattern, of cultural or natural history in New South Wales.

Has significance as a property that had long term family connections before being purchased for preservation by the state government

The place has a strong or special association with a person, or group of persons, of importance of cultural or natural history of New South Wales's history.

Has associations with a long time family of the area (the Lixs/Ryans) and Gustavius Lix, a man of international significance due to his associations with the World Expositions, in particular as secretary.

The place is important in demonstrating aesthetic characteristics and/or a high degree of creative or technical achievement in New South Wales.

Is located in a prominent location on the Great Western Highway with landmark qualities for motorists travelling this road as it would have been in the mid-late nineteenth century

The place has strong or special association with a particular community or cultural group in New South Wales for social, cultural or spiritual reasons.

Is a landmark to the local people of Mt Druitt and Blacktown who keep a watchful eye over the property.

The place is important in demonstrating the principal characteristics of a class of cultural or natural places/environments in New South Wales.

Neoblie is an excellent example of its style.
