= Blackett, New South Wales =

Blackett
- Suburb
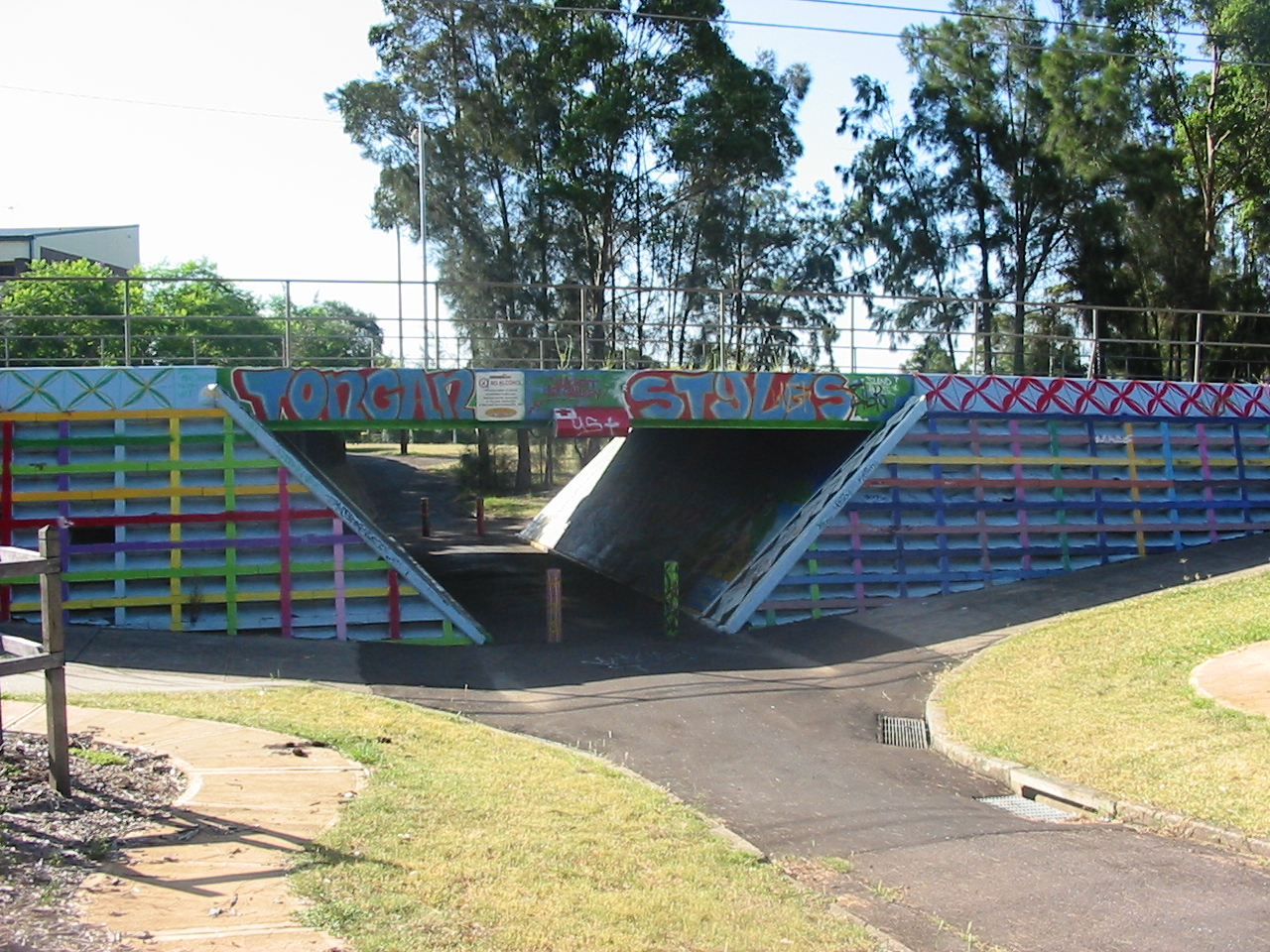
- Road bridge on the cycleway passing Blackett Primary School, showing artwork

- Interactive map of Blackett
- Country: Australia
- State: New South Wales
- City: Sydney
- LGA: City of Blacktown
- Location: 48 km (30 mi) west of Sydney CBD

Government
  - State electorate: Mount Druitt
  - Federal division: Chifley
- Elevation: 50 m (160 ft)

Population
  - Total: 3,586 (2021 census)
- Postcode: 2770
Suburbs around Blackett
Bidwill	Shalvey	Marsden Park
Lethbridge Park	Blackett	Oakhurst
Emerton	Dharruk	Hebersham

Blackett is a suburb of Sydney, in the state of New South Wales, Australia. Blackett is located 48 kilometres west of the Sydney central business district, in the local government area of the City of Blacktown and is part of the Greater Western Sydney region.

== History ==
Blackett takes its name from George Forster Blackett, Superintendent of the Government Cattle Station at Rooty Hill 1820–1830.

Blackett is primarily a residential suburb with very limited commercial activity, having only a small shopping complex containing a combination liquor/general store, a Halal and non-Halal butcher, a bakery, take-away store, and combined service station/general store, which caters heavily to residents of Pacific Islander extraction. It is close to the suburbs of Mount Druitt and St Marys, which most residents would consider to be more commercial areas (having shopping centres, banking facilities and railway stations). Other nearby suburbs with shopping facilities (though no rail access) include Emerton and Plumpton.

== Transport ==
By road, Blackett is adjacent to the Westlink M7 motorway which can provide very easy access to the Great Western Highway and the M4 Motorway, providing road access to the western sections of the city and eastward to the Sydney CBD. This suburb is linked by several private bus companies to the train stations located at Mount Druitt and St Marys.

Cycleways running through Blackett run from Poppondetta Park all the way to Mt Druitt and the M7 cycleway, which in turn connects to the cycleways on the M4 and M2 Motorways.

== Schools ==
Blackett Public School (founded in 1971) and Niland Special School are both public schools in the suburb.

== Demographics ==
According to the 2021 census, there were 3,586 people in Blackett.

- Aboriginal and Torres Strait Islander people made up 11.2% of the population.
- 58.4% of people were born in Australia. The next most common countries of birth were New Zealand 4.5% and Samoa 3.1%.
- 59.4% of people only spoke English at home. Other languages spoken at home included Samoan 4.9%, Arabic 2.8% and Tongan 2.1%.
- The most common responses for religion were No Religion 26.3%, Catholic 21.6%, Not stated 16.4% and Anglican 11.0%.

== Housing ==
Housing is very heavily dominated by public housing built throughout the 1960s and 1970s, with large numbers of freestanding fibro houses and extensive terrace-style complexes. The houses are gradually transferring to private ownership, and as this continues, these government-built premises are being replaced with privately built, modern homes, similar to those being built in other areas of Sydney.

Of occupied private dwellings in Blackett 89.1% were separate houses.

== Politics ==
For federal elections, Blackett is in the safe Labor electoral division of Chifley. This seat is currently held by Ed Husic of the Australian Labor Party and he was last re-elected at the 2025 election. The seat has been held continuously by the Australian Labor Party since it was proclaimed in 1984

For NSW state elections, Blackett is in the Electoral district of Mount Druitt. This seat is currently held by Edmond Atalla since 2015, of the Australian Labor Party. It has been held by a Labor candidate since it was proclaimed in 1971.

== Notes ==
1. State Election 2003 – Polling Booth Results, courtesy State Electoral Office of NSW.
2. Federal Election 2004 – Polling Booth Results for Chifley, courtesy Australian Electoral Commission.
