= Dharruk =

Dharruk may refer to:

- Dharruk people, an Australian Aboriginal tribe
- Dharruk language, their language
- Dharruk, New South Wales, a suburb of Blacktown named after the tribe
