= Lethbridge Park =

- Suburb
- Interactive map of Lethbridge Park
- Coordinates: 33°44′00″S 150°47′40″E
- Country: Australia
- State: New South Wales
- City: Greater Western Sydney
- LGA: City of Blacktown
- Location: 47 km (29 mi) west of Sydney CBD

Government
  - State electorates: Mount Druitt; Londonderry
  - Federal division: Chifley
- Elevation: 46 m (151 ft)

Population
  - Total: 4,730 (2021 census)
- Postcode: 2770
Suburbs around Lethbridge Park
Ropes Crossing	Willmot	Shalvey
North St Marys	Lethbridge Park	Blackett
Tregear	Whalan	Emerton

Lethbridge Park is a suburb of Greater Western Sydney, in the state of New South Wales, Australia. It is 47 kilometres (29 mi) west of the Sydney central business district, in the local government area of the City of Blacktown and is part of the Greater Western Sydney region.

== Name history ==
Lethbridge Park takes its name from the Lethbridge family. Robert Copeland Lethbridge settled at Werrington on a land grant made on 1 January 1806, while his sister Harriet settled on the Dunheved estate.

The district's two pioneering families were united by marriage. Harriet Lethbridge was married to then-Captain Phillip Parker King (1791–1856), son of Governor Philip Gidley King and Anna Josepha King (1765–1844). Robert Copeland Lethbridge married King's sister, Mary.

Robert Lethbridge in October 1865 aged 66 upon his death resided in Ashfield, and was survived by his wife. Mary died in December 1872, aged 67. His second son J(ohn) King Lethbridge died in May 1900, having built Werrington House, had been a magistrate and coroner, and left a wife, four sons, and four daughters. Descendants continued to live in the area.

== Suburb history ==
The suburb was created in the 1960s when Mount Druitt was being developed.

In the 1970s there was an active rugby league and soccer sports presence.

== Education ==
Lethbridge Park Primary School is a public school covering kindergarten to Grade 6.

== Notable persons ==
- Linda Burney (born 1957), politician. Was a teacher at Lethbridge Park public school (1979–1981).
- Roy Courlander (1914–1970), WW2 New Zealand soldier and British Free Corps SS Unit.
