= Hassall Grove =

- Suburb
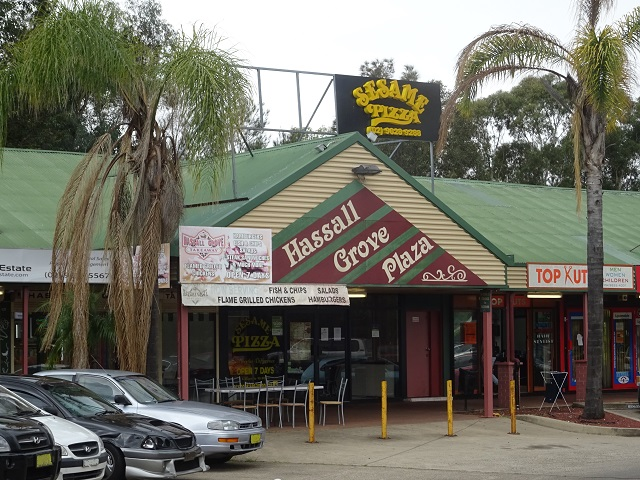
- Hassall Grove Plaza

- Interactive map of Hassall Grove
- Coordinates: 33.7333°S 150.8333°E
- Country: Australia
- State: New South Wales
- City: Sydney
- LGA: City of Blacktown
- Location: 46 km (29 mi) W of Sydney CBD

Government
  - State electorate: Mount Druitt
  - Federal division: Chifley
- Elevation: 44 m (144 ft)

Population
  - Total: 4,401 (2021 census)
- Postcode: 2761
Suburbs around Hassall Grove
Marsden Park	Marsden Park	Colebee
Bidwill	Hassall Grove	Dean Park
Hebersham	Oakhurst	Oakhurst

Hassall Grove is a suburb of Sydney, in the state of New South Wales, Australia. Hassall Grove is located 46 kilometres west of the Sydney central business district, in the local government area of the City of Blacktown and is part of the Greater Western Sydney region.

== History ==
Thomas Hassall (1794–1868) a clergyman, grazier and magistrate, arrived in the colony with his family in 1798 and they settled at Camden. Thomas Hassall married Anne, the eldest daughter of Reverend Samuel Marsden and their sons James Samuel and Rowland were amongst the earliest students at The King's School at Parramatta. Thomas Hassall started the first Sunday school in Australia in 1813.

Hassall Grove was named to honour Rowland Hassall (1768–1820), who was associated with the area as a Church of England Minister. He also acted as agent for the estates of Phillip Parker King and managed Samuel Marsden’s properties in his absence.

== Population ==
According to the 2021 census of Population, there were 4,401 people in Hassall Grove.

- Aboriginal and Torres Strait Islander people made up 4.0% of the population.
- 57.5% of people were born in Australia. The next most common countries of birth were Philippines 8.4%, India 3.9%, Fiji 2.9%, New Zealand 2.3% and Pakistan 2.1%.
- 54.3% of people spoke only English at home. Other languages spoken at home included Arabic 7.3%, Tagalog 6.0%, Hindi 3.3%, Urdu 2.5% and Punjabi 2.2%.
- The most common responses for religion were Catholic 30.5%, No Religion 19.0%, Islam 9.2%, Anglican 8.2% and Hinduism 6.2%.
- This suburb had a young population, with a median age of 32 and children aged 0–14 years making up 23.1% of the population.
