= Emerton =

Emerton is a surname. Notable people with the surname include:

- Andrew Emerton (born 1972), British Anglican priest and Bishop-designate of Sherwood
- Audrey Emerton, Baroness Emerton (1935–2026), British nursing administrator and politician
- Brett Emerton (born 1979), Australian footballer
- Danny Emerton (born 1991), English footballer
- Ephraim Emerton (1851–1935), American educator, author, translator, and historian
- James Henry Emerton (1847–1931), American arachnologist and illustrator
- John Emerton (1928–2015), British academic, Professor of Hebrew at Cambridge University
- Karin Emerton (born 1957), Australian jurist
- Roy Emerton (1893–1944), British film actor
- Wendy Emerton, birth name of Wendy Richard (1943–2009), English actress
- William Emerton Heitland (1847–1935), British classical scholar

== See also ==
- Emerton, New South Wales
