= The Lives of Mount Druitt Youth =

- Australian release poster
- Directed by: Saad Adam
- Produced by: Saad Adam
- Cinematography: Saad Adam
- Edited by: Saad Adam
- Production company: Question Mark Films
- Release date: 10 August 2010
- Running time: 60 minutes
- Country: Australia
- Language: English

The Lives of Mount Druitt Youth is a 2010 documentary film produced, and directed by Saad Adam, covering multiple subjects with intentions of "living a good life in Mount Druitt", inspired by Mount Druitt, NSW, Australia, being the place where the director was raised.

== Production ==
Saad created his own production company, 'Question Mark Films', and began working on the documentary in the autumn of 2009. The film was produced and directed with no budget, with the cinematographer/director using a Canon HG 21 camera, a broken camera stand, and an inexpensive microphone. The director interviewed 28 persons, 22 of whom appear in the documentary.

The filmmaker noted that family trips to the now-closed Wonderland Sydney helped him keep away from crime when growing up, and so recently created a petition calling on the State Government to build a theme park in western Sydney, as both a boost to local economy and a destination for Mount Druitt youth away from crime areas.

The film is being screened at such film festivals as the American Artist Film Festival, INDIE World Film Festival & Jura Books Festival.

== Storyline ==
In the documentary Saad returns to Mount Druitt and offers a view that is rarely seen by "outsiders", through his exploring the lives of various youths in a suburb that has otherwise built up a notorious reputation for crime and drugs. The documentary explores the real-life backgrounds and stories that run contrary to the stereotypical branding of the suburb.

== Interviewees ==
- Saad Adam
- Evan Adam
- Simon Bodie
- Marisa Boye
- Kane Browning
- Michael Chippendale
- Kimberly Delia
- Matt Green
- Andrew Herreros
- Craig Hudson
- Alan John
- Steven John
- Ringo Madut
- Sione Mahe
- Mathew Muddle
- Sean O'Malley
- Justin Pearce
- Drew Pearson
- Sage Pratt
- Amy Robertson
- Suny Sidhoo
- Mitchell Sparkes
- Aida Takla
- Matthias Tuifua
- Beniamin Tupu
- Catalin Tupu
- Damien Vella
- Bowen West
