= Castle Hill Public School =

School in New South Wales, Australia

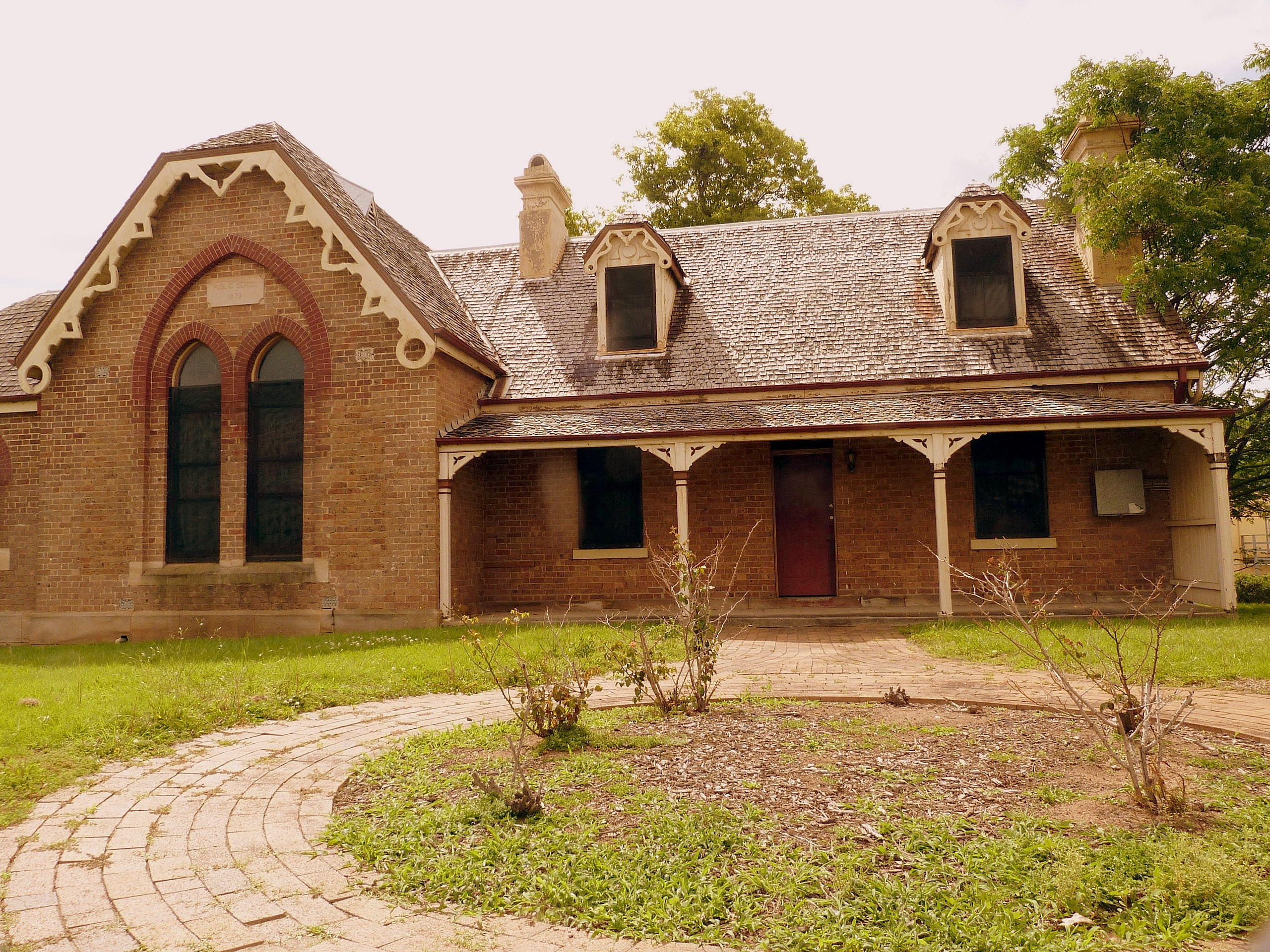
- The original school

Location
- Les Shore Place, Castle Hill, New South Wales, Australia
- Coordinates: 33.727887°S 151.004663°E

Information
- School type: Public co-educational primary day school
- Motto: Ever Higher
- Established: 1879
- Principal: Craig Oliver
- Teaching staff: 52
- Grades: Kindergarten – Year 6
- Enrolment: 1,095 (2023)
- Colours: Navy and Red
- Website: Official website

Castle Hill Public School is a public co-educational primary school located in the Sydney suburb of Castle Hill, New South Wales, Australia. It is administered by the New South Wales Department of Education, with an enrolment of 1,095 students and a teaching staff of 52, as of 2023. The school serves students from Kindergarten to Year 6.

It was established in 1879 and opened in July 1880. The original school building is listed on the New South Wales Heritage Register.

== History ==
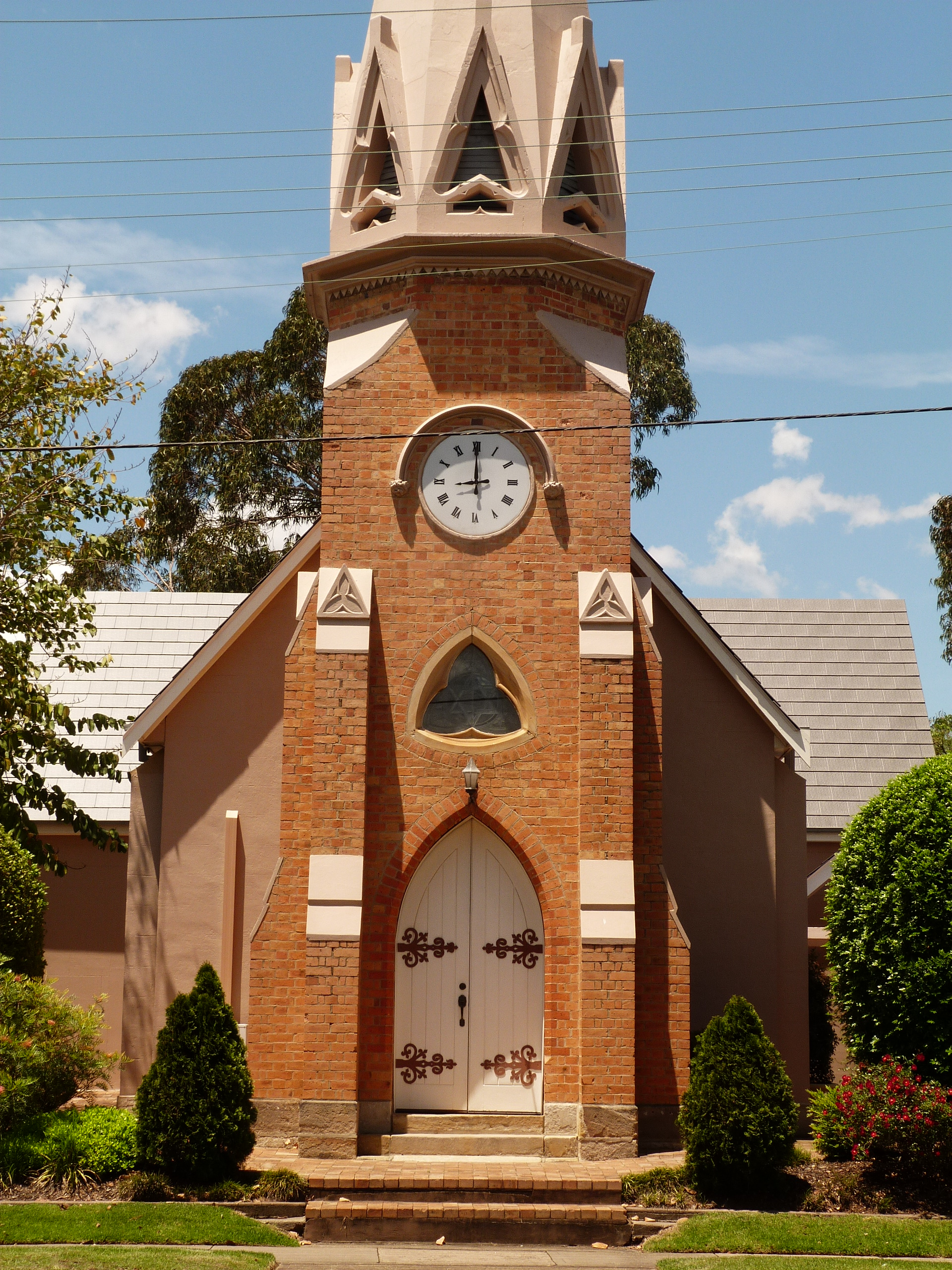
Former church, and site of former Church of England School

The school's origins are from 12 July 1880 when St Paul's Denominational School was closed, and the 64 students marched 800 metres to the new school site. The original Gothic school building and vested residence was designed by George Allen Mansfield and built by George Coates & Son in 1878. This building, still standing, and is today subject to a heritage conservation order.

Lessons commenced on 12 July 1880. At the time, Castle Hill was a rural community and the original building comprising a single classroom and a teacher residence provided for 64 students.

The school continued to grow in numbers and by the early 1980s was the largest public school in the New South Wales with over 1000 students. As the school and its community grew, additional land was acquired and buildings added.

In the late 1980s, 1,600 students were enrolled but with the building of other schools nearby, the student population has settled at around 800.

On 18 October 1998, the school moved to a new site, that was a former University of Sydney research centre, with the former school ground sold to Queensland Investment Corp for the expansion of Castle Towers shopping centre. The school continues on this new site. Building started mid-1997 and the new Castle Hill Public School was completed in October 1998.

== Principals ==
1. John Ussher 1 July 1880
2. John J. Carolan 10 February 1888
3. Robert S. McCormick 21 December 1894
4. Thomas E. Cambourn 19 March 1902
5. William H. Johnston 28 February 1910
6. Henry R. Anstey 14 May 1919
7. Robert M. Ross 27 March 1930
8. Arthur E. Cattell 5 December 1939
9. Edward J. Stanley 4 December 1942
10. George Redmond 30 January 1950
11. William N. Walker 1 February 1955
12. Hilton O. Bloomfield 30 January 1962
13. John G. Gallagher 28 January 1969
14. Leslie J. N. Shore 27 January 1976
15. Peter Shuttleworth 21 April 1992
16. Bryan Mullan 27 January 1998
17. Steve Connelly 21 January 2013
18. Craig Oliver 2015–present

== See also ==
- Education in New South Wales
- List of schools in Greater Western Sydney
