= Electoral district of Mount Druitt =

Mount Druitt
- Interactive map of district boundaries from the 2023 state election
- State: New South Wales
- Dates current: 1971–1981, 1991–present
- MP: Edmond Atalla
- Party: Labor Party
- Namesake: Mount Druitt
- Electors: 62,334 (2023)
- Area: 38.95 km^{2} (15.0 sq mi)
- Demographic: Outer-metropolitan
Electorates around Mount Druitt:
Londonderry	Londonderry	Blacktown
Londonderry	Mount Druitt	Blacktown
Badgerys Creek	Badgerys Creek	Prospect

Mount Druitt is an electoral district of the Legislative Assembly in the Australian state of New South Wales. It is represented by Edmond Atalla of the Labor Party.

It is a 38.95 km^{2} (15.04 sq mi) urban electorate in Sydney's outer west.

== History ==
Mount Druitt was originally created in 1971 and abolished prior to the 1981 election and replaced by St Marys. It was re-established prior to the 1991 election. It has always been represented by a member of the Labor Party.

== Geography ==
On its current boundaries, Mount Druitt takes in the suburbs of Mount Druitt, Bidwill, Blackett, Dean Park, Dharruk, Glendenning, Hassall Grove, Hebersham, Minchinbury, Oakhurst, Plumpton, Rooty Hill, Whalan, Shalvey and parts of Colebee, Eastern Creek, Emerton and Lethbridge Park.

== Members for Mount Druitt ==
First incarnation (1971—1981)
Member	Party	Term
Jim Southee	Labor	1971–1973
Tony Johnson	Labor	1973–1981
Second incarnation (1991—present)
Member	Party	Term
Richard Amery	Labor	1991–2015
Edmond Atalla	Labor	2015–present

== Election results ==
2023 New South Wales state election: Mount Druitt
Party	Candidate	Votes	%	±%
Labor	Edmond Atalla	29,710	60.9	+2.0
Liberal	Kandathil Sunil Jayadevan	11,470	23.5	−2.6
Greens	Asm Morshed	4,173	8.6	+1.9
Animal Justice	Andrew Dudas	3,393	7.0	+7.0
Total formal votes		48,746	94.6	−0.3
Informal votes		2,759	5.4	+0.3
Turnout		51,505	82.6	−1.6
Two-party-preferred result
Labor	Edmond Atalla	32,606	72.4	+3.8
Liberal	Kandathil Sunil Jayadevan	12,435	27.6	−3.8
Labor hold		Swing	+3.8	

Two-candidate preferred results for the electoral district of Mount Druitt View source data.
