= Mount Druitt =

- Suburb
- Interactive map of Mount Druitt
- Country: Australia
- State: New South Wales
- City: Sydney
- LGA: City of Blacktown
- Location: 43 km (27 mi) west of Sydney CBD

Government
  - State electorates: Mount Druitt; Londonderry
  - Federal division: Chifley
- Elevation: 58 m (190 ft)

Population
  - Total: 16,986 (2021 census)
- Postcode: 2770
Suburbs around Mount Druitt
Dharruk & Whalan	Hebersham	Plumpton
North St. Marys	Mount Druitt	Rooty Hill
Oxley Park	Colyton	Minchinbury

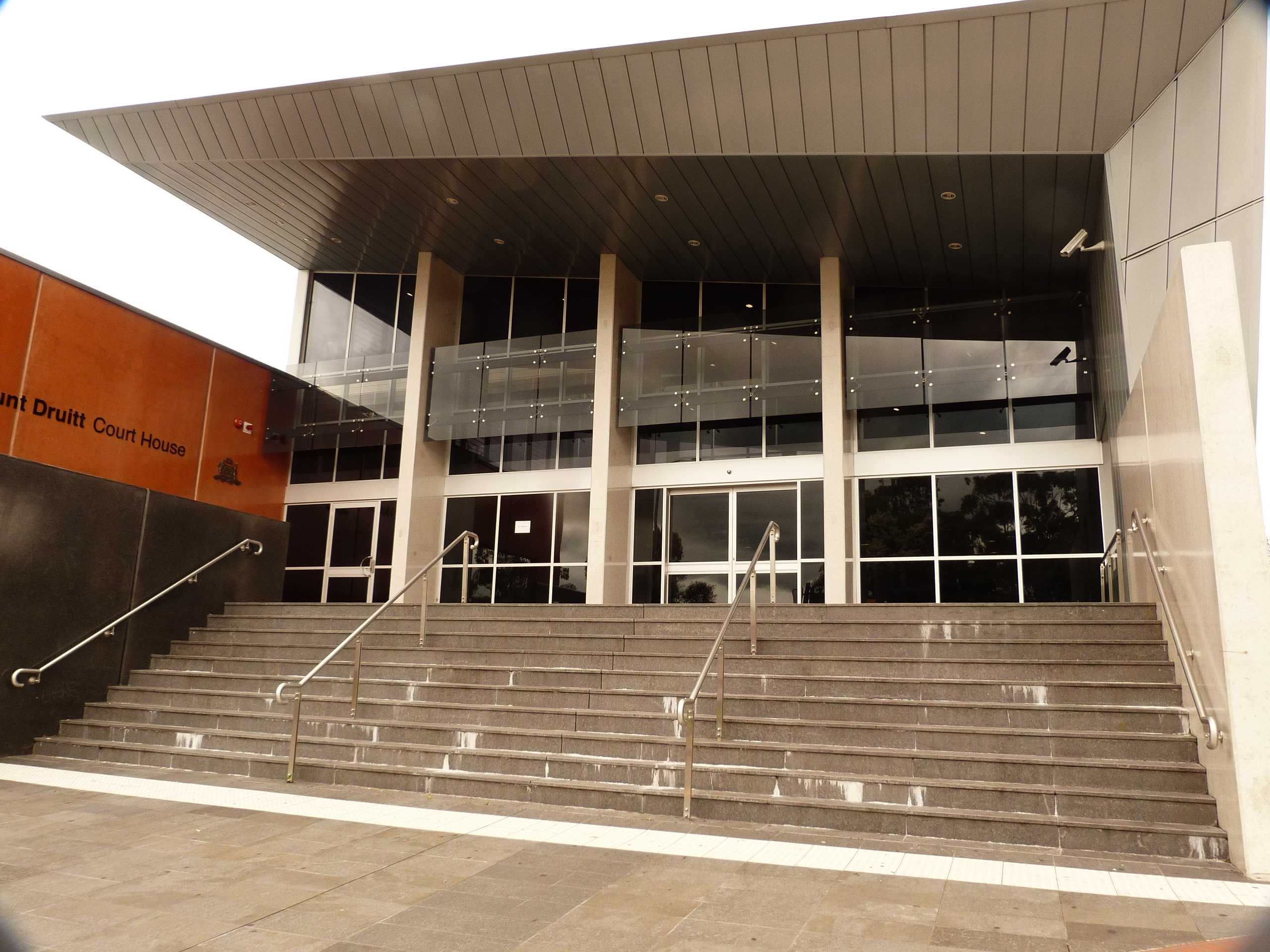
Mt Druitt Court House, North Parade

Mount Druitt is a suburb of Sydney, in the state of New South Wales, Australia. It is located 43 kilometres (27 mi) west of the Sydney central business district, in the local government area of the City of Blacktown, and is part of the Greater Western Sydney region.

There are numerous smaller suburbs nearby including Bidwill, Blackett, Dharruk, Emerton, Hebersham, Lethbridge Park, Minchinbury, Shalvey, Tregear, Whalan, and Willmot that are often collectively called Mount Druitt or the Mount Druitt area.

== History ==
Major George Druitt (1773–1842) was granted 2,000 acres (8.1 km^{2}) in the area by Governor Macquarie. He named his grant, where he died in 1842, Mount Druitt.

In April 2006, the Attorney General's Department of New South Wales opened a new court house at a cost of A$12 million. This was to become the first metropolitan area courthouse to utilise "circle sentencing", with aims to reduce over representation of Aboriginal Australians in custody.

A local landmark is the Georgian cottage known as The Manse, situated in The Avenue. It was probably built by John Harris in the mid-1880s; the land on which it was built was originally part of Druitt's property. Later it was sold to Robert Kennedy. Kennedy left it to the Presbyterian Church when he died, and it was used for some time as a manse. It was acquired by Blacktown City Council in 2000 and restored. It is now the headquarters of the Mt Druitt Historical Society and is open to the public. It has both a local government and state government heritage listing.

== Heritage listings ==
Mount Druitt has a number of heritage-listed sites, including:

- Great Western Highway: Neoblie
- 23 The Avenue: The Manse

== Transport ==
Mount Druitt railway station is located along the Main Western railway line and receives services on the T1 Western Line.

The first electric train to Mount Druitt operated 8 October 1955.

== Education ==
Mount Druitt High school was established in the 1960s.

Colyton Public School, established in 1861, is located in Mount Druitt.

== Crime ==
It was widely reported during the 2010s that Mount Druitt was one of the most dangerous suburbs in Sydney. This has been linked to low property prices in the suburb relative to the rest of Sydney.

In 2018, there were 2,299 firearms in Mount Druitt, the highest rate of gun ownership in Sydney (though Mosman had the highest rate per capita). In 2025, there were 387.61 crimes per 1,000 people in Mount Druitt, which is much higher than the Australian average of 81, but since the total number of crimes had dropped to its lowest level. However, property and violent crimes were more or less equal to the number recorded in 2024

The suburb is known as a hub for many street gangs, including NF14, also known as Onefour (not to be confused with the band of the same name).

== Demographics ==
According to the 2021 census of population, there were 16,986 people in Mount Druitt.

- 50.3% of people were female, and 49.7% of people were male.
- The most common ancestries were Australian 13.1%, Filipino 12.6%, English 11.1%, Pakistani 7.5%, and Indian 7.3%.
- 40.6% of people were born in Australia. The next most common countries of birth were Philippines 9.5%, Pakistan 6.5%, Iraq 5.1%, India 4.7% and Fiji 2.5%.
- 32.8% of people spoke only English at home. 68.1% of people spoke a non-English language at home. Some of the other languages spoken at home included Urdu 9.4%, Arabic 7.2%, Tagalog 6.1%, Bengali 3.5%, and Chaldean Neo-Aramaic 3.1%.
- The most common responses for religion were Catholic 27.4%, Islam 23.8%, No Religion 11.7%, Not Stated 7.5%, and Hinduism 5.9%.
- The most common occupations included Machinery Operators and Drivers 17.0%, Professionals 16.6%, Clerical and Administrative Workers 13.6%, Labourers 12.4%, Technicians and Trades Workers 10.4%, Sales Workers 8.2%, and Managers 6.4%.

== Notable people ==
- George Donikian, journalist and newscaster
- Calum Hood, musician, bassist of 5 Seconds of Summer
- Josh Lalor, cricketer
- Beki Lee, Olympic athlete, raised in Mount Druitt.
- Spencer Leniu, professional NRL player
- Jarome Luai, professional NRL player
- Anthony Roberts, member for the electoral district of Lane Cove, grew up in the area.
- Brian To'o, professional NRL player
- Onefour, Australian drill and rap music group
- Tai Tuivasa, UFC heavyweight fighter

== See also ==
- Mount Druitt Hospital
- Mount Druitt Waterworks
- The Lives of Mount Druitt Youth
- Westfield Mount Druitt
