= Bidwill, New South Wales =

Bidwill
- Suburb
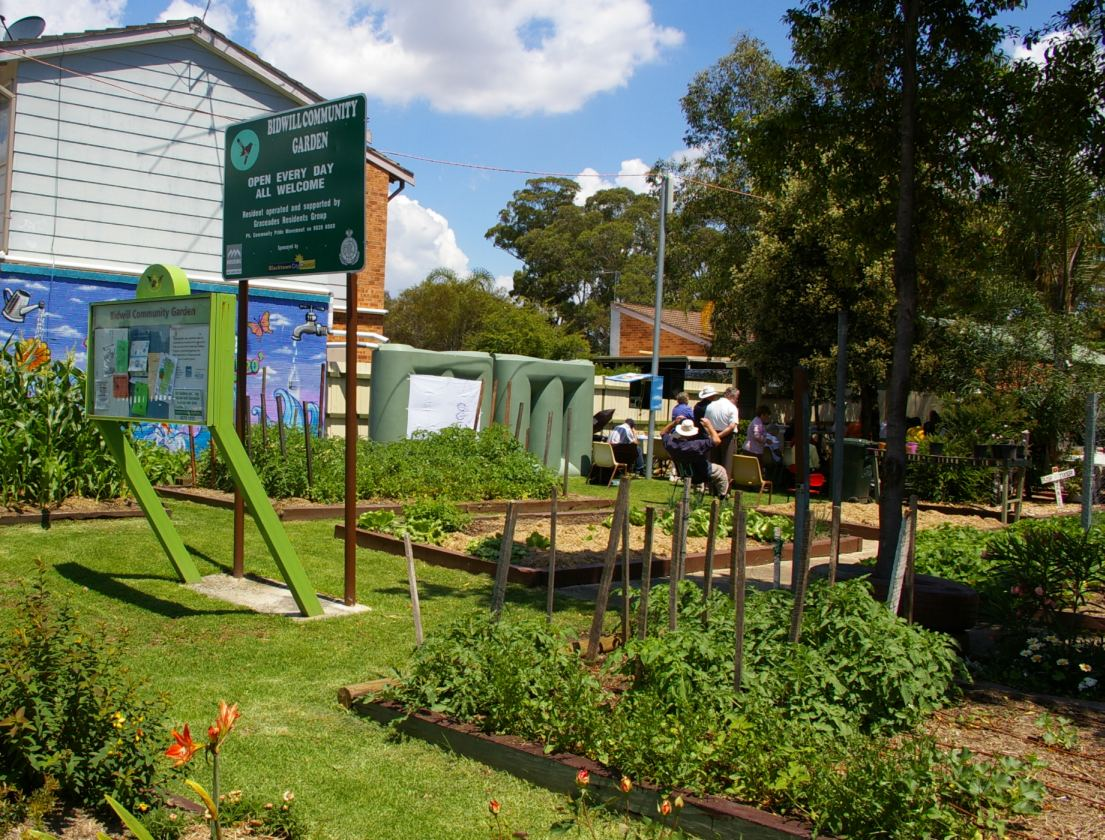
- Bidwill Community Garden, Chestnut Crescent

- Interactive map of Bidwill
- Country: Australia
- State: New South Wales
- City: Sydney
- LGA: City of Blacktown
- Location: 48 km (30 mi) west of Sydney CBD

Government
  - State electorate: Mount Druitt
  - Federal division: Chifley
- Elevation: 52 m (171 ft)

Population
  - Total: 4,202 (2021 census)
- Postcode: 2770
Suburbs around Bidwill
| Marsden Park | Marsden Park | Marsden Park |
| Shalvey | Bidwill | Hassall Grove |
| Dharruk | Hebersham | Oakhurst |

Bidwill is a suburb of Sydney, in the state of New South Wales, Australia. Bidwill is located 48 kilometres west of the Sydney central business district, in the local government area of the City of Blacktown and is part of the Greater Western Sydney region.

== History ==
Bidwill takes its name from John Carne Bidwill (1815-1853) appointed as botanist in charge at the Botanic Gardens in 1847. Prior to settlement and colonisation of Australia, Bidwill and the surrounding area was inhabited by the Darug tribe.

Bidwill was dominated by public housing development between the 1960s and 1970s. In 1973, the NSW Housing Commission clashed with Blacktown Council over the naming of streets. The commission sought names associated with John Bidwill, while the council preferred local names. Of the 30 names proposed by the council, only 4 were accepted: Carlisle, Chestnut, Luxford, and Popondetta.

By 1977, Bidwill Public School and High School were opened. This was followed by Bidwill Youth Centre in 1983 and Yawarra Child Care Centre in 1985. Bidwill High School became part of Chifley College in 2000, following a reorganisation of high schools in the area.

In recent times, Bidwill has been associated with social and economic problems. These have resulted in an increase of crime and such trouble as riots. It is known for drug use, violence, mental illness and poverty.

== Commercial areas ==
Bidwill is primarily a residential suburb with extremely limited commercial activity. It is quite close to the suburbs of Mount Druitt and St Marys, which have larger shopping centres, banking facilities and railway stations.

Limited commercial facilities such as supermarkets and Filling stations are available at Emerton and Plumpton rather than in Bidwill itself. In the late 1970s and early 1980s, there used to be a service station on Carlisle avenue. It was located in front of where a small supermarket complex existed at Bidwill in the 1980s and 1990s, but failed due to competition from larger facilities nearby. There have been ongoing attempts to reopen the shopping complex.

== Transport ==
On the day of the 2021 Census, the methods of travel to work for employed people were car (either as driver or as passenger) 61.9% and public transport 5.6%. Public transport through this area is provided by Busways.

By road Bidwill is adjacent to the Westlink M7 motorway which can provide very easy access to the Great Western Highway and the M4 Motorway, providing road access to the western sections of the city and eastward to the Sydney CBD. This suburb is linked by several private bus companies to the train stations located at Mount Druitt and St Marys.

Cycleways running through Bidwill run from Poppondetta Park to Mt Druitt and the M7 cycleway, which in turn connects to the cycleways on the M4 and M2 motorways.

== Education ==
Bidwill Primary School and the Bidwill Campus of Chifley College share a campus with a pre-school. Combined, these separate organisations provide care and education from pre-school (3 years) to Year 12 (17–18 years).

Upon completing year 10 at the Bidwill Campus, students continuing public education can either move on to Chifley College Senior Campus located in Mount Druitt, or continue their final years at Bidwill Campus.

In 2021, in Bidwill 62.2% of people were attending an educational institution. Of these, 26.9% were in primary school, 20.9% in secondary school and 9.0% in a tertiary or technical institution.

== Population ==
According to the 2021 census of population, there were 4,280 people in Bidwill.

- Aboriginal and Torres Strait Islander people made up 15.3% of the population.
- 62.6% of people were born in Australia. The next most common countries of birth were New Zealand 3.2% and Samoa 2.6%.
- 62.9% of people only spoke English at home. Other languages are:
  - Samoan 4.9%
  - Arabic 3.3%
  - Tongan 2.5%
  - Tagalog 1.0%
  - Hindi 0.9%
- The most common responses for religion were No Religion 30.2%, Catholic 19.9% and Anglican 9.3%.

== Housing ==
Housing is very heavily dominated by public housing built throughout the 1960s and 1970s, with large numbers of freestanding fibro houses and extensive terrace-style complexes. The houses are gradually transferring to private ownership and as this continues these government-built premises are being replaced with privately built, modern homes, similar to those being built in other areas of Sydney.

Most local housing is owned by either the Department of Housing or Aboriginal Housing Office.

Of occupied private dwellings in Bidwill, 64.6% were separate houses and 33.6% were semi-detached.

== Politics ==
Federal elections
| Labor | 64.65% |
| Liberal | 21.32% |
| Greens | 4.91% |
| Pauline Hanson's One Nation (NSW Division) | 3.96% |
| Family First | 1.95% |
| Christian Democratic Party (Fred Nile Group) | 1.89% |
| Independent (Graham Rand) | 0.25% |
| Independent (Wayne Hyland) | 1.07% |

State elections
| Labor | 64.9% |
| Greens | 4.4% |
| Liberal | 17.0% |
| Christian Democratic Party | 9.5% |
| AAFI | 4.2% |

For federal elections, Bidwill is in the safe Labor electoral division of Chifley. This seat is currently held by Ed Husic, of the Australian Labor Party. The seat has been held continuously by the Labor Party since it was proclaimed in 1984.

For NSW state elections, Bidwill is in the Electoral district of Mount Druitt. This seat is currently held by Edmond Atalla, of the Labor Party. It has been held by a Labor candidate since it was proclaimed in 1971.

== Notes ==
1. State Election 2007 - Polling Booth Results, courtesy State Electoral Office of NSW.
2. Federal Election 2004 - Polling Booth Results for Chifley, courtesy Australian Electoral Commission.
