= George Druitt =

- Born: 1773; Leinster, Dublin, Ireland
- Died: 9 June 1842 (aged 68–69); Blacktown, New South Wales, Australia
- Occupation(s): Soldier, Pioneer
- Spouse: Margaret Lynch
- Children: Judith, George, Edward, Joseph, Margaret, Jane Euphemia, and James
- Parent(s): Edward Druitt, Jane Cottingham

Major George Druitt (1773 – 9 June 1842) was a soldier and Australian pioneer. Mount Druitt was named after him.

Druitt became a professional soldier in 1794. As a member of 48th Regiment he sailed to Australia in 1817 on the Matilda, with 440 officers and men.

While on his journey to New South Wales, George met and formed a relationship with Margaret Lynch (his future wife) who had stowed away on the ship to be with one of the other soldiers. Once they arrived in Australia, George and Margaret lived together and had a daughter Judith in 1819, and two sons, George Joseph in 1820 and Edward in 1821. George and Margaret were married in 1825, eight years after they met. After they were married, they had four more children, Joseph in 1825, Margaret Jane in 1828, Jane Euphemia in 1829 and James Cottingham in 1837.

== Works in the colony ==
Druitt oversaw the construction and maintenance of roads and bridges by convict labour around Sydney. He was granted land near what was to become Blacktown. The area that was named Mount Druitt in his honour. The suburb which became Strathfield South was also originally named Druitt Town in his honour

George died on 9 June 1842, aged 69, some four months after his wife.

== See also ==
- History of Australia (1788-1850)
- European exploration of Australia
- History of New South Wales
