= Glenwood Public School =

Coordinates: 33°58′29″S 150°54′09″E

Location
- Belmont Road (Cnr Harrow Road); Glenfield, New South Wales 2167; Australia

Information
- Type: Primary school
- Established: 1981
- Grades: K–6
- Information: (02) 9605 3260
- Website: School website

Glenwood Public School is a primary school in Glenfield, Australia. It is noted for its national and international award-winning movies.

== History ==
The school was officially opened in 1986 but has been operational since 1981. It was constructed on land in Glenfield formerly owned by pioneering surgeon Charles Throsby. It is one of two primary schools in Glenfield.

== Technology ==
Each classroom at the school has an interactive whiteboard. Glenwood also has a computer lab which includes a media centre for the production of movies and music. Lessons are available online at Glenwood’s YouTube channel, Channel Glenwood.

== Movies ==
In 1993 Glenwood staged a production of Shakespeare's Henry V performed entirely by a Year 3 class. The success of this production led to a performance of Hamlet the following year which in turn led to a feature-length movie adaptation of Macbeth (1996). Video technology became an increasing component of the stage productions, culminating in a multi-media production of Richard III in 2000.

In 2004, Glenwood was invited to participate in the inaugural Australian Kid Witness News video program. Glenwood’s movie, The Boy Who Broke Every Rule in the School (2004) won the major prize, with another Glenwood film, Hippies Save the Trees (2004) taking out a technical award for Special Effects. Glenwood won the KWN major prize again in 2005 with Revenge of the Litter (2005). Revenge of the Litter also won the KWN Asia–Pacific Regional Prize that year. Heat It Up: Global Warming (2006) won the KWN major prize in 2006, along with the Australian Teachers of Media (ATOM) Award for Best K-8 Video Film Production in 2007. Time Trial (2005) won Best Film: Environment at the Australian Primary Schools Film Festival. The Sorrow of War (2007) won the Short Sited Film Festival: Youth Award and the ANZAC Day Schools Award for Best Use of Technology and was shortlisted for Tropfest. The Sorrow of War was also cited by TropJr director Michael Laverty as being instrumental in the creation of that festival. It also was voted Best Australian Film by Kids at the Little Big Shots International Short Film Festival for Kids. Glenwood was also a finalist in the inaugural TropJr with Free Free at Last (2008). In 2018, students and staff from Glenwood Public School traveled to Italy to receive an award from Gef, the World Festival of Creativity in Schools, for their film Chocolypse!
