= Shalvey =

- Suburb
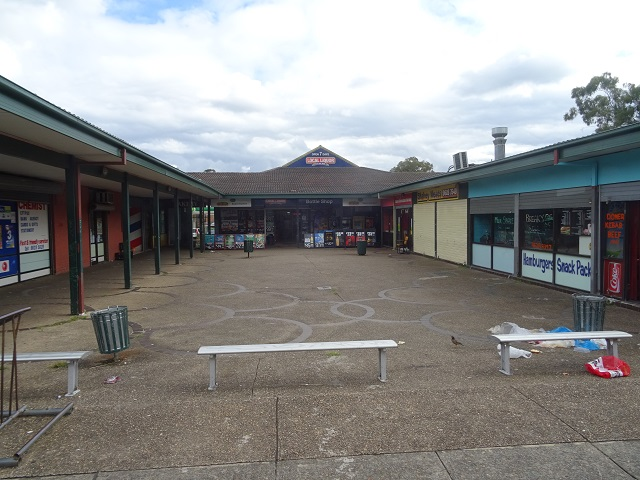
- Shalvey shops

- Interactive map of Shalvey
- Coordinates: 33.7194°S 150.8000°E
- Country: Australia
- State: New South Wales
- City: Sydney
- LGA: City of Blacktown
- Location: 48 km (30 mi) west of Sydney CBD

Government
  - State electorate: Mount Druitt
  - Federal division: Chifley
- Elevation: 40 m (130 ft)

Population
  - Total: 3,455 (2021 census)
- Postcode: 2770
Suburbs around Shalvey
| Shanes Park | Shanes Park | Marsden Park |
| North St Marys | Shalvey | Bidwill |
| North St Marys | Lethbridge Park | Blackett |

Shalvey is a suburb of Sydney, in the state of New South Wales, Australia. Shalvey is located 48 kilometres west of the Sydney central business district, in the local government area of the City of Blacktown and is part of the Greater Western Sydney region.

== History ==
Shalvey takes its name from the main road in the area which was originally a crown subdivisional road. The road was named after Patrick Shalvey (1866–1962) who was a large landholder and ran an abattoir there to service his butcher shops in the city.

== Housing ==
Housing is very heavily dominated by public housing under the control of the NSW Department of Housing built throughout the 1960s and 1970s, with a large number of extensive terrace-style complexes. These are gradually transferring to private ownership and as this continues these government-built premises are being replaced with privately built, modern homes, similar to those being built in other areas of Sydney.

== Commercial area ==
Shalvey has a small shopping complex known as Shalvey Shops. There is a supermarket/liquor drive through, chemist, laundromat, tobacconist, bakery, and a BP service station, with a fully equipped mechanical workshop.

== Politics ==
2022 Australian federal election
| Labor | 52.72% |
| Liberal | 24.74% |
| Pauline Hanson's; One Nation (NSW Division) | 6.21% |
| Greens | 5.78% |
| United Australia | 5.30% |
| Liberal Democrats | 3.36% |
| Independent (Ammar Khan) | 1.89% |

For federal elections, Shalvey is in the safe Labor electoral division of Chifley. This seat is currently held by Ed Husic, of the Australian Labor Party, who was elected in the 2010 elections. The seat has been held continuously by the Labor Party since it was proclaimed in 1969.

For NSW state elections, Shalvey is in the electoral division of Mount Druitt. This seat is currently held by Edmond Atalla, of the Labor Party.
