= Blacktown City Council =

- Local government area
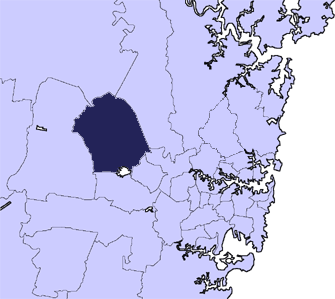
- Location in Metropolitan Sydney

- Interactive map of Blacktown City Council
- Coordinates: 33°46′S 150°55′E
- Country: Australia
- State: New South Wales
- Region: Western Sydney
- Established: 6 March 1906 (Shire); 17 June 1961 (Municipality); 9 March 1979 (City)
- Council seat: Civic Centre, Blacktown

Government
  - Mayor: Brad Bunting
  - State electorates: Blacktown; Winston Hills; Mount Druitt, Riverstone; Londonderry, Prospect; Badgerys Creek
  - Federal divisions: Chifley; Greenway; McMahon

Area
  - Total: 246.9 km^{2} (95.3 sq mi)

Population
  - Total: 435,000 (2023 census)
  - Density: 1,761.8/km^{2} (4,563/sq mi)
- Time zone: UTC+10 (AEST)
  - Summer (DST): UTC+11 (AEDT)
- Website: Blacktown City Council
LGAs around Blacktown City Council
Penrith	Hawkesbury	The Hills Shire
Penrith	Blacktown City Council	Parramatta
Penrith	Fairfield	Cumberland

Blacktown City Council is a local government area in Western Sydney, situated on the Cumberland Plain, approximately 35 kilometres (22 mi) west of the Sydney central business district, in the state of New South Wales, Australia. Established in 1906 as the Blacktown Shire and becoming the Municipality of Blacktown in 1961 before gaining city status in 1979, the City occupies an area of 246.9 square kilometres (95.3 sq mi) and has a population of 410,419, making it the most populous local government area in Sydney. It is a member council of the Hawkesbury River County Council.

The Mayor of Blacktown City Council is Councillor Brad Bunting following the death of then-mayor Tony Bleasdale OAM, a member of the Australian Labor Party who died 3 May 2024.

== Suburbs and localities in the local government area ==
These are the suburbs and localities in the local government area:

- Acacia Gardens
- Angus
- Arndell Park
- Bidwill
- Blackett
- Blacktown
- Bungarribee
- Colebee
- Dean Park
- Dharruk
- Doonside
- Eastern Creek
- Emerton
- Glendenning
- Glenwood
- Grantham Farm
- Hassall Grove
- Hebersham
- Huntingwood
- Kellyville Ridge
- Kings Langley
- Kings Park
- Lalor Park
- Lethbridge Park
- Marayong
- Marsden Park
- Melonba
- Minchinbury
- Mount Druitt
- Nirimba Fields
- Oakhurst
- Parklea
- Plumpton
- Prospect (shared with Cumberland Council)
- Quakers Hill
- Richards
- Riverstone
- Ropes Crossing
- Rooty Hill
- Rouse Hill (shared with The Hills Shire)
- Schofields
- Seven Hills (shared with City of Parramatta Council)
- Shalvey
- Shanes Park (shared with City of Penrith)
- Stanhope Gardens
- St Marys (shared with City of Penrith)
- Tallawong
- The Ponds
- Toongabbie (shared with City of Parramatta Council and Cumberland Council)
- Tregear
- Vineyard (shared with City of Hawkesbury)
- Whalan
- Willmot
- Woodcroft

== History ==
The first road from Prospect to Richmond became known as the "Black Town Road" and in 1860 the Railway Department gave the name of "Black Town Road Station" to the railway station at the junction of the railway and the Black Town Road, with the name shortening to "Blacktown" by 1862. The Blacktown area was first incorporated on 6 March 1906 as the "Shire of Blacktown" alongside 132 other new shires across the state as a result of the passing of the Local Government (Shires) Act, 1905. The first five-member temporary council was appointed on 15 May 1906 and first met on 20 June in the Rooty Hill School of Arts. The Blacktown Shire became the "Municipality of Blacktown" on 17 June 1961 and was granted city status on 9 March 1979, becoming the "City of Blacktown".

== Blacktown Council Chambers and Civic Centre ==
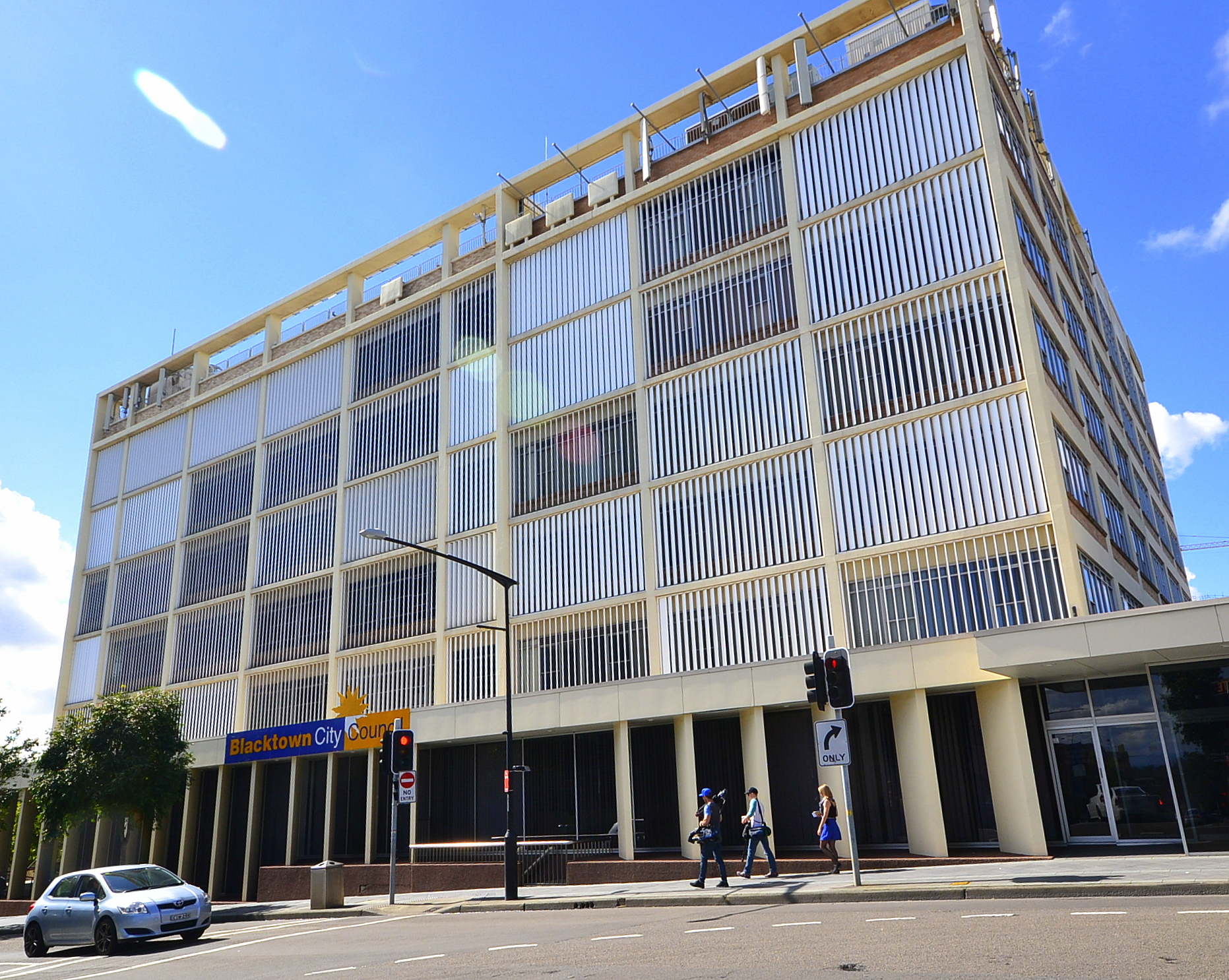
Blacktown Civic Centre, Flushcombe Road, Blacktown, has been the council seat since 1961.

In 1937 Blacktown council discussed the need for new Council Chambers, with the present arrangements seen as inadequate and unable to accommodate growing staff needs. In August 1938, the council discussed two schemes from architect Leslie J. Buckland for the new council chambers, with the scheme that created a new wing facing Flushcombe Road while retaining the old council chambers for other uses being the most favoured. Designed in the modernist Inter-war Functionalist style by Buckland and constructed by J. H. Abbey of Epping at a cost of £7,000, the Council Chambers were officially opened on 29 July 1939 by the Minister for Public Works and Local Government, Eric Spooner.

By the early 1960s, Blacktown Council resolved to develop a new council seat and 'civic centre' and an International style design by Parramatta architects, Leslie J. Buckland & Druce (George Harley, project architect), for a multi-storey administration building, a performance hall, library and basement parking was accepted at a cost of £500,000. Built of concrete and brick, with decorative facade panels and glass curtain walling, the Civic Centre was constructed by S. J. Wood & Co Lty Ltd, with A. S. Nicholson as the consulting engineer.

The foundation stone for the Civic Centre was laid by Premier of NSW, Bob Heffron, on 17 June 1961, on the same occasion marking the change of Blacktown from a Shire to a Municipality. The Civic Centre was officially opened on 25 October 1965 by the Minister for Local Government and Highways, Pat Morton, with the mayor, Alfred Ashley-Brown, declaring "It is my sincere wish we will as a council cherish the heritage which brings us here tonight – that this chamber will be a place wherein good government within our sphere of responsibility will be made manifest, and that all decisions which are made shall be for the good of the people of the Municipality of Blacktown". On 10 April 1967, the old 1939 Council Chambers were transformed into the first Blacktown Municipal Library, which was later demolished and became the Max Webber Library from 1980.

In 1984, with the Civic Centre being overcrowded and suffering from lack of space, the council approved significant extensions to the Civic Centre at a cost of $2,781,550 that added 2,000 square metres of office floor space and enabled the consolidation of all council departments in a single location. The extensions were constructed by McNamara Constructions Pty Limited.

== Blacktown City Libraries ==
In 1947, Blacktown Shire Council formally adopted the Library Act 1939, which had been passed to encourage (including by giving financial subsidies to) local governments to establish free public libraries, but no further action was taken due to a lack of finance. However it was not until the 1960s, with the significant growth in the area's population, the Council identified a clear need for a library service, and when the Civic Centre opened in 1965, council appointed the first Chief Librarian in 1966 and resolved to establish the first library in the old 1939 Council Chambers building on the opposite side of Flushcombe Road. The first Blacktown Municipal Library was officially opened on 10 April 1967.

The Blacktown City Libraries service expanded with the opening of Library Branches at Lalor Park (1968), Mount Druitt (1977) and Riverstone (1978). In 1979, Blacktown council commissioned a new Blacktown branch library, with the old library and 1939 Council Chambers building demolished and replaced by a new building designed by architects Allen Jack & Cottier, and constructed by R. W. Tims (Builders) Pty Ltd. On 31 October 1979, Council resolved to name this new library after the Town Clerk of Blacktown, Max Webber, and the Max Webber Library was officially opened by the Deputy Premier Jack Ferguson on 8 March 1980. A new branch library, the Dennis Johnson Branch Library (named after a former Town Clerk), opened in Stanhope Gardens on 7 August 2009.

== Waste management ==
Household general waste collected from red-lidded bins within the Blacktown City local government area is collected by Cleanaway and transported to the Erskine Park Waste and Resource Recovery Centre transfer station. From there, it is transferred to the Lucas Heights Resource Recovery Park landfill for disposal.

== Demographics ==
At the 2021 census, there were 396,776 people resident in the Blacktown local government area, of these 49.9 per cent were male and 50.1 per cent were female. Aboriginal and Torres Strait Islander people made up 3.0 per cent of the population, similar to the NSW and Australian averages of 3.4 and 3.2 per cent respectively. The median age of people in the City of Blacktown was 34 years, which was slightly lower than the national median of 38 years. Children aged 0 – 14 years made up 22.7 per cent of the population and people aged 65 years and over made up 11.0 per cent of the population. Of people in the area aged 15 years and over, 52.6 per cent were married and 9.5 per cent were either divorced or separated.

Population growth in the City of Blacktown between the 2001 census and the 2006 census was 6.47 per cent; and in the subsequent five years to the 2011 census, population growth was 10.82 per cent. At the 2016 census, the population in the local government area increased by 11.91 per cent. When compared with total population growth of Australia for the same period, being 8.8 per cent, population growth in Blacktown local government area was in excess of 35% more than the national average. The median weekly income for residents within the City of Blacktown was generally on par with the national average.

At the 2021 census, the proportion of residents in the Blacktown local government area who stated their ancestry as Filipino, was in excess of five times the national average. The proportion of residents who stated a religious affiliation with Hinduism was in excess of four times the national average; the proportion of Catholics was 4.7 per cent above the national average; and the proportion of residents with no religion about half the national average. Meanwhile, as at the census date, the area was linguistically diverse, with Tagalog, Hindi, Punjabi, or Gujarati languages spoken in households, and ranged from two times to five times the national averages.

Selected historical census data for Blacktown local government area
Census year		2001	2006	2011	2016	2021
Population	Estimated residents on census night	255,195	▲271,709	▲301,099	▲336,962	▲396,776
Population	LGA rank in terms of size within New South Wales			1st	▼2nd	▲1st
Population	% of New South Wales population	3.88%	▲4.41%	▼4.35%	▲4.50%	▲4.91%
Population	% of Australian population	1.36%	▲1.37%	▲1.40%	▲1.44%	▲1.56%
Cultural and language diversity						
Ancestry, top responses	Australian	30.0%	▼29.6%	▼25.5%	▼17.8%	▲29.9%
Ancestry, top responses	English	24.8%	▼21.5%	▲21.7%	▼16.2%	▲33.0%
Ancestry, top responses	Indian	3.7%	▲5.2%	▲7.3%	▲8.9%	▲13.5%
Ancestry, top responses	Filipino	6.7%	▲7.7%	▲8.6%	▼7.0%	–
Ancestry, top responses	Irish	6.7%	▼5.4%	▲5.7%	▼4.4%	▲9.5%
Ancestry, top responses	Scottish	–	–	–	–	▲8.6%
Ancestry, top responses	Chinese	–	–	–	–	5.5%
Language, top responses (other than English)	Tagalog	5.1%	▼3.6%	▲4.0%	4.0%	▼3.8%
Language, top responses (other than English)	Hindi	1.8%	▲2.6%	▲3.6%	▲4.0%	▲4.4%
Language, top responses (other than English)	Punjabi	0.8%	▲1.1%	▲2.3%	▲3.6%	▲5.2%
Language, top responses (other than English)	Arabic	2.9%	▲3.2%	3.2%	▼3.0%	▼2.9%
Language, top responses (other than English)	Filipino	n/c	▲2.1%	2.1%	▼1.9%	–
Language, top responses (other than English)	Gujarati	–	–	–	–	2.4%
Religious affiliation						
Religious affiliation, top responses	Catholic	36.3%	▼34.8%	▼33.3%	▼29.2%	▼24.7%
Religious affiliation, top responses	Islam	3.6%	▲4.6%	▲5.8%	–	8.0%
Religious affiliation, top responses	No religion, so described	8.4%	▲9.6%	▲10.7%	▲15.0%	▲18.1%
Religious affiliation, top responses	Anglican	19.6%	▼17.1%	▼14.9%	▼13.3%	▼7.3%
Religious affiliation, top responses	Hinduism	2.3%	▲3.7%	▲5.8%	▲8.5%	▲13.1%
Religious affiliation, top responses	Not stated	–	–	–	7.6%	–
Median weekly incomes						
Personal income	Median weekly personal income		$473	▲$565	▲$672	▲$831
Personal income	% of Australian median income		101.5%	▼97.9%	▲101.5%	▲103.2%
Family income	Median weekly family income		$1,105	▲$1,492	▲$1,817	▲$2,251
Family income	% of Australian median income		107.6%	▼100.7%	▲104.8%	▲106.1%
Household income	Median weekly household income		$1,188	▲$1,388	▲$1,711	▲$2,107
Household income	% of Australian median income		101.5%	▲112.4%	▲119%	120.6%

== Council ==
Blacktown City Council

Leadership
- Mayor: Brad Bunting (Labor)
- Deputy Mayor: Carol Israel (Independent NSW)

Structure
- Seats: 15 councillors
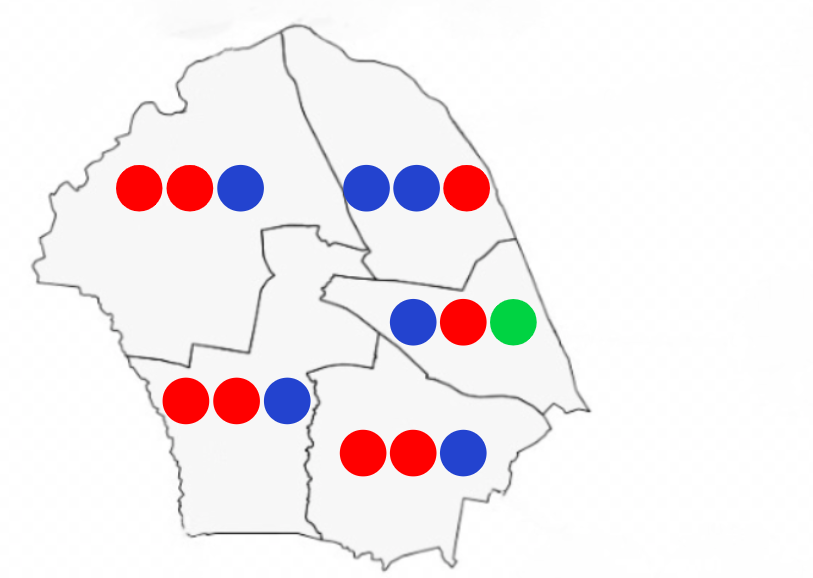
- Map of elected councillors by party in each of the 5 wards
- Political groups: Majority (8): Labor (8); Others (7) Liberal (6) Greens (1)

Elections
- Voting system: Single transferable vote
- Last election: 14 September 2024
- Next election: 16 September 2028

Blacktown City Council is composed of fifteen councillors elected proportionally as five separate wards, each electing three councillors. All councillors are elected for a fixed four-year term of office. The mayor is elected by the councillors at the first meeting of the council. Following the passing of Cr Tony Bleasdale, Cr Brad Bunting was elected Mayor in 2024.

=== Current composition ===
The most recent election was held on 14 September 2024, The makeup of the Council by ward, is as follows:

Ward	Councillor	Party	Notes
Ward 1	Jess Diaz	Liberal	First elected 2008.
Ward 1	Allan Green	Liberal	
Ward 1	Moninder Singh	Labor	First elected 2016.
Ward 2	Mohit Kumar	Liberal	
Ward 2	Julie Griffiths	Labor	First elected 2008; Deputy Mayor 2019–2022, 2022–2023.
Ward 2	Damien Atkins	Greens	First Elected 2024.
Ward 3	Pradeep Pathi	Liberal	
Ward 3	Carol Israel	Independent	First elected 2016, former member of the Labor Party, Deputy Mayor
Ward 3	Susai Benjamin	Labor	First elected 2012.
Ward 4	Peter Camilleri	Liberal	Ward 5 Councillor 2016–2021; Ward 4 Councillor 2021–Present
Ward 4	Bob Fitzgerald	Labor	
Ward 4	Dorothy Del Villar	Labor	
Ward 5	Jugandeep Singh	Liberal	
Ward 5	Brad Bunting	Labor	Elected 2016; Deputy Mayor Jan–Sep 2022. Mayor 15 May 2024 – present
Ward 5	Talia Amituanai	Labor	

== Election results ==
=== 2024 ===
2024 New South Wales local elections: Blacktown
Party	Votes	%	Swing	Seats	Change
Labor	96,925	47.4	-5.8	8	▼2
Liberal	80,601	39.4	+8.4	6	▲3
Greens	20,334	9.9	+7.4	1	▲1
Animal Justice	6,263	3.1	+3.1	0	Steady
Independents	390	0.2	-11.7	0	▼2
Formal votes	204,513	94.0	+0.5		
Informal votes	12,968	6.0	-0.5		
Total	217,481	100%	N/A	15	
Registered voters / turnout					

=== 2021 ===
The Liberal Party did not endorse any candidates, including its five councillors elected in 2016.

2021 New South Wales local elections: Blacktown
Party	Votes	%	Swing	Seats	Change
Labor	98,633	53.6	+1.8	10	Steady
Blacktown Coalition Team	33,720	18.3	+18.3	1	▲1
Independent Liberal	32,747	17.8		3	▲3
Your Community Coalition	9,104	4.9	+4.9	1	▲1
Greens	4,632	2.5		0	Steady
Blacktown Matters Independents	4,335	2.4		0	Steady
Independent	981	0.5		0	Steady
Formal votes	184,152	93.47			
Informal votes	12,862	6.53			
Total	197,014	100.0			

== Office-holders ==
=== Shire Presidents and Mayors ===
#	Shire President	Party	Term	Notes
1	Richard Joseph Sherlock (chairman)	Independent	20 June 1906 – 10 December 1906	
2	Thomas Willmot	Independent	10 December 1906 – 2 February 1910	
–	Richard Joseph Sherlock	Independent	2 February 1910 – 9 February 1911	
–	Thomas Willmot	Independent	9 February 1911 – 4 February 1914	
3	George Best	Independent	4 February 1914 – 1 March 1915	
4	Adam Thomson Pringle	Independent	1 March 1915 – 9 February 1916	
5	John Henry Smith Angus	Independent	9 February 1916 – 10 February 1920	
6	John Charles Page	Independent	10 February 1920 – 14 December 1920	
7	George Alfred Lalor	Independent	14 December 1920 – 12 December 1922	
8	Arthur Moorehead	Independent	12 December 1922 – 21 December 1926	
9	William Thomas Cable	Independent	21 December 1926 – 20 December 1927	
–	George Alfred Lalor	Independent	20 December 1927 – 4 December 1928	
10	Arthur Leonard Francis	Independent	4 December 1928 – 23 December 1930	
11	John McMurtrie	Independent	23 December 1930 – 14 January 1932	
–	John Charles Page	Independent	14 January 1932 – 4 December 1934	
–	Arthur Leonard Francis	Independent	4 December 1934 – 8 December 1938	
12	Thomas Russell Stone	Independent	8 December 1938 – 13 December 1945	
13	John Alexander Fyall	Independent	13 December 1945 – 20 December 1950	
14	John Sidney Bromfield		20 December 1950 – December 1956	
15	Wally Payne		December 1956 – December 1957	
16	George Alexander Dryden		December 1957 – December 1958	
17	Gordon Archibald Baker		December 1958 – December 1959	
18	Alfred Ashley-Brown	Labor	December 1959 – 17 June 1961	
#	Mayor	Party	Term	Notes
–	Alfred Ashley-Brown	Labor	17 June 1961 – December 1965	
19	Victor John Corcoran		December 1965 – December 1966	
20	Hilton Robinson	Independent	December 1966 – December 1967	
–	Alfred Ashley-Brown	Labor	December 1967 – December 1968	
–	Victor John Corcoran		December 1968 – 10 December 1969	
21	Col Holden		10 December 1969 – 2 December 1970	
–	Alfred Ashley-Brown	Labor	2 December 1970 – September 1971	
22	Peter Richard Stone		September 1971 – September 1974	
23	George Nicolaidis OAM	Independent	September 1974 – September 1976	
24	Peter James Shinnick		September 1976 – September 1977	
25	John Aquilina	Labor	September 1977 – September 1981	
26	James Patrick Lynch	Labor	September 1981 – September 1985	
27	Leo Kelly	Labor	September 1985 – September 1987	
28	Russ Dickens OAM	Independent	September 1987 – September 1988	
29	Bob Sinclair	Independent	September 1988 – September 1990	
–	Leo Kelly	Labor	September 1990 – September 1991	
30	Jim Anderson	Labor	September 1991 – 5 April 1995	
31	Charlie Lowles	Labor	5 April 1995 – 20 September 1995	
32	Michael Corbin	Labor	20 September 1995 – September 1996	
–	Charlie Lowles	Labor	September 1996 – September 1999	
33	Alan Pendleton	Labor	September 1999 – 14 April 2004	
–	Leo Kelly OAM	Labor	14 April 2004 – September 2008	
–	Charlie Lowles OAM	Labor	September 2008 – September 2010	
–	Alan Pendleton OAM	Labor	September 2010 – 26 September 2012	
34	Len Robinson	Liberal	26 September 2012 – 17 September 2014	
35	Stephen Bali	Labor	17 September 2014 – 9 October 2019	
36	Tony Bleasdale OAM	Labor	9 October 2019 – 3 May 2024	
37	Brad Bunting	Labor	15 May 2024 – present	

=== Shire/Town Clerks and General Managers ===
Name	Term	Notes
Matthew W. Hawkings (Interim)	20 June 1906 – 31 December 1906	
Hugh Reid	1 January 1907 – 1 February 1914	
George Davis	1 February 1914 – March 1916	
Eric H. Croxon	28 March 1916 – May 1920	
T. B. Webster	24 May 1920 – 30 May 1922	
George Nixon Stewart	30 May 1922 – 12 September 1943	
Herbert K. Pollack	29 May 1944 – 1959	
W. A. C. Dale	1959–1969	
Max Webber	1969–1984	
Dennis G. Johnson	1984–1996	
Terry McCormack	1996–2000	
Ian Reynolds	2000–2005	
Ron Moore	2005 – 17 April 2013	
Kerry Robinson OAM	July 2013 – present	

== Coat of arms ==
After becoming a city in 1979, the council resolved to investigate and if possible obtain a coat of arms, making a request to the Chester Herald of Arms, Hubert Chesshyre. With the design completed by March 1981, Council resolved to adopt the coat of arms at its meeting on 1 April 1981.

Coat of arms of Blacktown City Council
Adopted 1 April 1981 (Grant of Arms: 4 June 1981) Crest A Kookaburra proper supporting with its dexter claw a Boomerang Gold Torse Wreath Or and Sable Helm A closed Helm Escutcheon Per chevron Sable and Or in chief two sprigs of Sunshine wattle (Acacia discolor) and issuant in base the head of an Australian Aborigine Sable. Supporters Dexter a large Grey Kangaroo and sinister a Chestnut Trotting Horse proper Motto Progress Other elements Mantling Sable doubled Or Symbolism The symbols are representative of Australian native flora and fauna which, before colonisation, would have been abundant in the Blacktown area. The Aboriginal image depicts the population of the area pre-colonisation. The horse, or bush brumby, relates to the years 1810–1850 when the breeding of horses was the single most prolific industry in the Blacktown area.

== Heritage listings ==
The City of Blacktown has a number of heritage-listed sites, including those on the New South Wales State Heritage Register:

- Prospect, Upper Canal System
- Prospect, Great Western Highway: Veteran Hall Remains
- Prospect, Ponds Road: St Bartholomew's Anglican Church and Cemetery
- Prospect, Reservoir Road: Former Great Western Road Alignment, Prospect
- Prospect, Reservoir Road: Prospect Reservoir
- Prospect, East of Reservoir: Prospect Reservoir Valve House
- Prospect, 385 Reservoir Road: Royal Cricketers Arms Inn
- Prospect, 23 Tarlington Place: Prospect Post Office

== Sister cities ==
Blacktown City Council has sister city relations with the following cities:

- Porirua, Wellington Region, North Island, New Zealand, since 1984
- Suseong-gu, Daegu, South Korea, since 1994
- Liaocheng, Shandong, China, since 2003
- Liverpool Plains, New South Wales, Australia, since 2005
