= Emerton, New South Wales =

Emerton
- Suburb
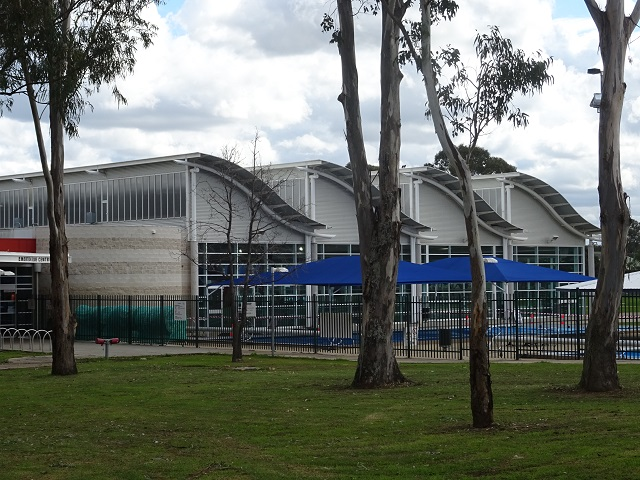
- Emerton Leisure Centre

- Interactive map of Emerton
- Country: Australia
- State: New South Wales
- City: Sydney
- LGA: City of Blacktown
- Location: 46 km (29 mi) W of Sydney CBD

Government
  - State electorates: Londonderry; Mount Druitt
  - Federal division: Chifley

Area
  - Total: 0.8 km^{2} (0.31 sq mi)
- Elevation: 46 m (151 ft)

Population
  - Total: 2,295 (2021 census)
  - Density: 2,870/km^{2} (7,400/sq mi)
- Postcode: 2770
Suburbs around Emerton
Lethbridge Park	Bidwill	Blackett
Tregear	Emerton	Dharruk
Whalan	Whalan	Whalan

Emerton is a suburb of Sydney, in the state of New South Wales, Australia. Emerton is located 46 kilometres west of the Sydney central business district, in the local government area of the City of Blacktown and is part of the Greater Western Sydney region.

Emerton is primarily a residential suburb with very limited commercial activity centred on the Emerton Leisure Centre. It is quite close to the suburbs of Mount Druitt, New South Wales and St Marys.

The suburb's boundary is formed to the south and east by Popondetta Road continuing north around the extent of Popondetta Park. To the west, the boundary runs along Halmahera Creek until the creek meets Luxford Road and follows the road south to the intersection with Popondetta Road.

== History ==
Emerton takes its name from William Frederick Emert, a native of Siglingen, Germany, who arrived in Australia in 1853. In 1861 he became a storekeeper and postmaster in Mount Druitt. Emert also took a leading part in forming the Wesleyan Church in Australia.

== Commercial areas ==
There are several retail developments adjacent to the intersection of Jersey and Popondetta Roads, surrounding the main shopping centre called 'Emerton Village'. These include an Australia Post post office, supermarket, service station, medical centres, take-away food and a hotel. Banking is limited to retail EFTPOS and automatic teller machines.

== Transport ==
By road Emerton is adjacent to the Westlink M7 motorway which can provide very easy access to the Great Western Highway and the M4 Motorway, providing road access to the western sections of the city and eastward to the Sydney CBD. This suburb is linked by several private bus companies to the train stations located at Mount Druitt and St Marys.

Cycleways running through Emerton run from Popondetta Park all the way to Mt Druitt and the M7 cycleway, which in turn connects to the cycleways on the M4 and M2 motorways.

== Housing ==
The three most common forms of dwelling were in decreasing order: a separate house; a semi-detached, row/terrace house, or townhouse; a flat, unit or apartment.

== Recreation ==
Following extensive refurbishment by Blacktown City Council, the Emerton Leisure Centre (formerly Emerton Pool) was reopened in August 2006. In 2017, the centre was renamed the Charlie Lowles Leisure Centre. The leisure centre incorporates both indoor and outdoor swimming pools (including a hydrotherapy pool) and outdoor facilities include a beach volleyball court.

Adjacent is Popondetta Park, which extends between Popondetta Road and Halamahera Creek, from Jersey Road to Bougainville Road. This park incorporates extensive sporting fields for cricket, netball, rugby league and soccer.

== Population ==
According to the 2021 census of Population, there were 2,295 people in Emerton.

- Aboriginal and Torres Strait Islander people made up 9.6% of the population.
- 58.8% of people were born in Australia. The next most common countries of birth were New Zealand at 6.0%, Philippines at 4.9%, Cook Islands at 2.7%, Samoa at 2.7% and England at 1.6%.
- 60.2% of people only spoke English at home. Other languages spoken at home included Samoan at 6.3%, Tagalog at 3.4%, Arabic at 3.0%, Cook Islands Maori at 2.3% and Tongan at 1.7%.
- The most common responses for religion were No Religion 24.7%, Catholic 24.4%, Not stated 10.7% and Anglican 8.6%.
- The median age of people was 32 years. Children aged 0 – 14 years made up 25.2% of the population.
- The unemployment rate (12.0%) was more than double the national rate of 5.1%.

== Politics ==
For federal elections, Emerton is in the safe Labor electoral division of Chifley. This seat is currently held by Ed Husic of the Labor Party, elected in the 2010 election. He was Australia's first Muslim in the federal government during Kevin Rudd's second stint as prime minister. Chifley has been held continuously by Labor since it was proclaimed in 1984.

For NSW state elections, Emerton is mainly in the Electoral district of Londonderry. It is represented by Prue Car of the Labor Party.
