= Dharruk, New South Wales =

Dharruk
- Suburb
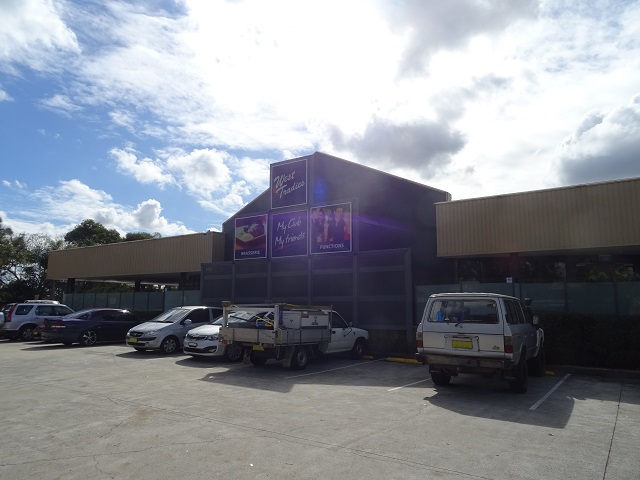
- West Tradies club in Dharruk

- Interactive map of Dharruk
- Country: Australia
- State: New South Wales
- City: Sydney
- LGA: City of Blacktown
- Location: 46 km (29 mi) west of Sydney CBD

Government
  - State electorate: Mount Druitt
  - Federal division: Chifley
- Elevation: 52 m (171 ft)

Population
  - Total: 2,806 (2021 census)
- Postcode: 2770
Suburbs around Dharruk
Emerton	Blackett	Hebersham
Emerton	Dharruk	Hebersham
Whalan	Whalan	Mount Druitt

Dharruk (/dærʌk/) is a suburb of Sydney, in the state of New South Wales, Australia. It is located 46 kilometres west of the Sydney central business district, in the local government area of the City of Blacktown and is part of the Greater Western Sydney region.

Dharruk is chiefly a residential suburb with almost no industry or commercial activity. The only other significant activity is education, with the Mount Druitt campus of Chifley College and Dawson Public School located in the suburb. The boundaries of Dharruk are defined by Carlisle Avenue to the east, Popondetta Road to the west, Jersey Road to the north and Woodstock Avenue to the south.

== History ==
Dharruk is derived from the name of the Darug people, an Aboriginal tribe associated with the area west of Sydney.

== Population ==
According to the 2021 census of Population, there were 2,806 people in Dharruk.

- Aboriginal and Torres Strait Islander people made up 6.6% of the population.
- 56.2% of people were born in Australia. The next most common country of birth was Fiji at 3.2%.
- 54.5% of people only spoke English at home. Other languages spoken at home included Arabic 7.9% and Hindi 3.2%.
- The most common responses for religion were Catholic 24.1%, No Religion 20.3%, Islam 13.4% and Anglican 8.4%.

== Housing ==
Housing in Dharruk is almost entirely low density in nature and is a mixture of private residential development and former NSW Housing Commission estate; most homes in the suburb were built between the late 1960s and the mid-1970s. The Housing Commission properties were erected in the north eastern portion of the suburb (in the vicinity of Dawson Public School); however, the majority of housing in Dharruk consists of slightly newer homes built by private residential development companies in the 1970s. As elsewhere in NSW, many of the former Housing Commission properties have been transferred to private ownership. The 2016 Australian census indicated that 30% of occupied private dwellings in Dharruk were rented while approximately 65% were owned outright or in conjunction with a mortgage.

== Commercial area ==
The West Tradies Club is the main commercial facility in Dharruk. There are otherwise limited commercial and retail outlets within the area, although the adjacent suburbs of Emerton, Plumpton, and Mount Druitt offer access to a wide range of supermarkets, banks, and department stores.

== Schools ==
Chifley College's Mount Druitt campus is located within Dharruk. Formerly Mount Druitt High School (established 1969), it is named for Ben Chifley, Australian Prime Minister of Australia from 1945 to 1949. Nearby is Dawson Public School (established 1972).
