= Chifley College Senior Campus =

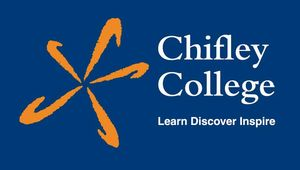

Location
- Mount Druitt, Western Sydney, New South Wales; Australia; 33°46′11″S 150°49′46″E

Information
- Type: Government-funded co-educational post-compulsory secondary day school
- Motto: Learn, Discover, Inspire
- Established: 2000; 26 years ago
- Educational authority: New South Wales Department of Education
- Years: 11–12
- Campus: Suburban
- Colours: White, blue, grey and black
- Website: chifcolsnr-h.schools.nsw.gov.au

Chifley College Senior Campus is located in Mount Druitt, New South Wales, Australia, catering to students in Years 11 and 12. It is one of the five schools within Chifley College and is locally known as Chifley Senior.

It is part of a five-campus college. The school offers a range of courses and opportunities for Stage 6.

== Facilities ==
Facilities include the Learning Hub, Lecture Theatre, Sue Leary Centre, Performing Arts Space, Active Area and Gymnasium. It has specialised learning spaces for its subjects, including hospitality, construction, visual design/arts, design and technology, computer applications, science, music and minimum standards. All rooms in the school are air conditioned.

== Subjects offered ==
- English – Extension 1 & 2, Advanced, Standard, Studies, EAL/D, life skills
- Maths – Extension 1 & 2, Advanced, Standard 2, Standard 1, life skills
- Science – Biology, chemistry, physics, investigating science
- HSIE – Aboriginal studies, ancient history, business studies, business services (VET), geography, history extension, history matters, legal studies, modern history, retail services (VET), society and culture, work studies
- LOTE – French and Italian
- CAPA – visual arts, music, drama, visual design, photography, video and digital imaging
- PDHPE – community and family studies, dance, exploring early childhood, personal development, health and physical education, sport lifestyle and recreation, sport lifestyle and recreation (rugby league), sport coaching
- Support – English life skills, work and the community life skills, mathematics life skills, visual arts life skills, science life skills, information processes and technology life skills, PDHPE life skills, food technology life skills, human society and environment life skills
- VET – business services, construction, entertainment industry, hospitality, information and design technology, metal and engineering, retail services, sports coaching
- TAS – engineering studies, industrial technology, design and technology, work studies: industrial technology, computer applications, information processes and technology)

== Minimum standards ==
The campus runs designated Minimum Standards classes to assist students in passing the compulsory NESA mandated Minimum Standards tests for Literacy and Numeracy. The school has had above-average results and has been recognised on a state level for its Minimum Standards Program. It has received three awards to date:

- Executive Director's Recognition Program 2019: Certificate of Recognition
- Secretary's School Achievement Award 2020
- Secretary's Award for an Outstanding School Initiative 2020

== Additional programs ==
- Assessment Help Centre – Run on Thursday afternoons, teachers provide additional assistance to help students with understanding coursework, as well as the completion of homework and assessments.
- Ace Club – This group caters for high achieving students. As part of this group, student receive support and guidance through a mentor program, a focus on study skills and methods to deal with study stress, etc.
- Clontarf and Girl's Academy – These specialised groups provide support for Aboriginal boys and girls through mentoring and supporting students both inside and outside the classroom.
- Tutorial Programs – A tutorial program is run for Year 12 ATAR students every day after school. During this time, teachers meet with their students to assist with coursework and assessments.
- Job Search – The Job Search program is aimed at students who want to join the workforce. The program prepares students for work by assisting with putting together a resume, applying for jobs, obtaining a Tax File Number, opening a bank account, etc.

== See also ==
- List of Government schools in New South Wales
