= Hebersham =

- Suburb
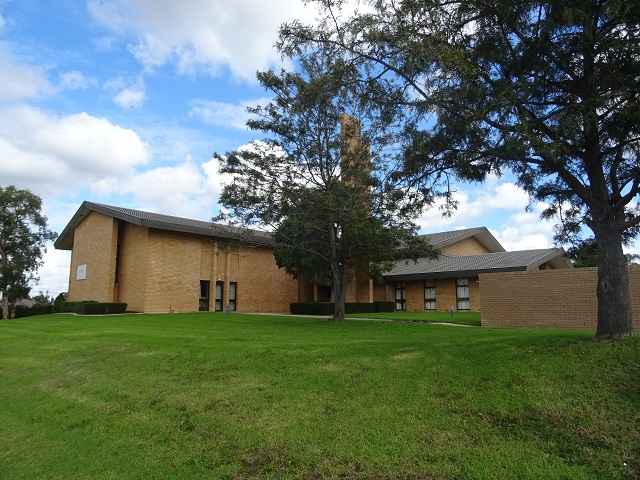
- LDS Church on Pringle Road

- Interactive map of Hebersham
- Country: Australia
- State: New South Wales
- City: Sydney
- LGA: City of Blacktown
- Location: 47 km (29 mi) W of Sydney CBD

Government
  - State electorate: Mount Druitt
  - Federal division: Chifley
- Elevation: 60 m (200 ft)

Population
  - Total: 5,643 (2021 census)
- Postcode: 2770
Suburbs around Hebersham
| Shanes Park | Bidwill | Oakhurst |
| Dharruk | Hebersham | Plumpton |
| Whalan | Mount Druitt | Rooty Hill |

Hebersham is a suburb of Sydney, in the state of New South Wales, Australia. Hebersham is located 47 kilometres west of the Sydney central business district, in the local government area of the City of Blacktown and is part of the Greater Western Sydney region.

== History ==
Hebersham was coined to honour the Anglican Bishop Reginald Heber of Calcutta whose diocese included New South Wales. In 1829 the Trustees of the Clergy and Schools Lands in New South Wales planned to establish a village named Hebersham on the Western Highway, west of Eastern Creek. This never happened, but the name was used for this present day suburb.

== Demographics ==
According to the 2021 census of Population, there were 5,643 people in Hebersham.

- Aboriginal and Torres Strait Islander people made up 7.9% of the population.
- 56.1% of people were born in Australia. The next most common countries of birth were Philippines 4.7%, Fiji 4.1%, New Zealand 3.7%, Pakistan 2.6% and Samoa 2.1%.
- 53.9% of people spoke only English at home. Other languages spoken at home included Urdu 4.4%, Arabic 4.3%, Hindi 4.2%, Samoan 3.9% and Tagalog 3.1%.
- The most common responses for religion were Catholic 23.9%, No Religion 21.3%, Islam 12.6%, Not stated 9.7% and Anglican 8.8%.

== Education ==
Hebersham is also home to Hebersham Public School, a primary school founded in 1972.

== Sports and Recreation ==
Heber Park is a large recreational park in the centre of Hebersham. It contains several sports fields, a basketball court, playgrounds, and off-leash dog parks. The park has basic facilities such as goalposts, shelters, and field lighting to support local-level sports.
