= North St Marys =

- Suburb
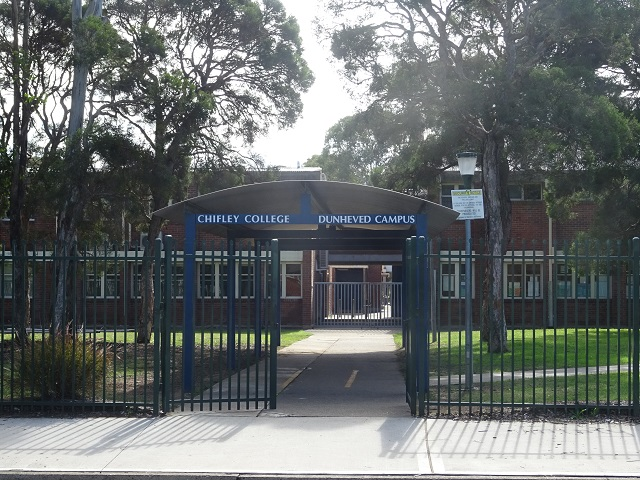
- Chifley College Dunheved Campus, North St Marys

- Interactive map of North St Marys
- Country: Australia
- State: New South Wales
- City: Sydney
- LGA: Penrith City Council
- Location: 47 km (29 mi) west of Sydney CBD

Government
  - State electorate: Londonderry
  - Federal division: Lindsay

Area
  - Total: 3.16 km^{2} (1.22 sq mi)
- Elevation: 35 m (115 ft)

Population
  - Total: 4,123 (2021 census)
  - Density: 1,304.7/km^{2} (3,379/sq mi)
- Postcode: 2760
Suburbs around North St Marys
Ropes Crossing	Tregear	Whalan
St Marys	North St Marys	Mount Druitt
St Marys	St Marys	Oxley Park

North St Marys is a suburb in western Sydney, in the state of New South Wales Australia. North St Marys is located 47 kilometres west of the Sydney central business district, in the local government area of the City of Penrith. North St Marys is an extension of the adjoining suburb of St Marys.

== History ==
=== Aboriginal culture ===
Prior to European settlement, what is now North St Marys was home to the Gomerrigal-Tongarra people who spoke the Darug language. They lived a hunter-gatherer lifestyle governed by traditional laws, which had their origins in the Dreamtime. Their homes were bark huts called 'gunyahs'. They hunted kangaroos and emus for meat, and gathered yams, berries and other native plants. Little else is known of their customs and there are no known carvings or rock paintings in the area. By 1816, their numbers had been reduced by smallpox and clashes with the British settlers.

=== European settlement ===
The first land grant in the area was made in 1820 to Phillip Parker King, son of the Governor Phillip Gidley King. He named it Triangle Farm but did very little with the land and it remained largely vacant land until the 1940s when it was bought by the Commonwealth Government to house workers at the St Marys munitions factory.

== Population ==
=== Demographics ===
According to the 2021 census of Population, there were 4,123 people in North St Marys.

- Aboriginal and Torres Strait Islander people made up 10.5% of the population.
- 64.8% of people were born in Australia. The next most common countries of birth were New Zealand 3.1% and the Philippines 2.6%.
- 68.1% of people spoke only English at home.
- The most common responses for religion were No Religion 31.8%, Catholic 22.2% and Not stated 15.2%.

== Governance ==
At a local government level, North St Marys is part of the east ward of Penrith City Council, represented by Prue Car, Greg Davies, Maurice Girotto, Jackie Greenow and Tricia Hitchen. At the state level, it is part of the Electoral district of Londonderry, represented by Prue Car of the Australian Labor Party. Federally, it is part of the Division of Lindsay, represented by Liberal's Melissa McIntosh.
