= Whalan, New South Wales =

Whalan
- Suburb
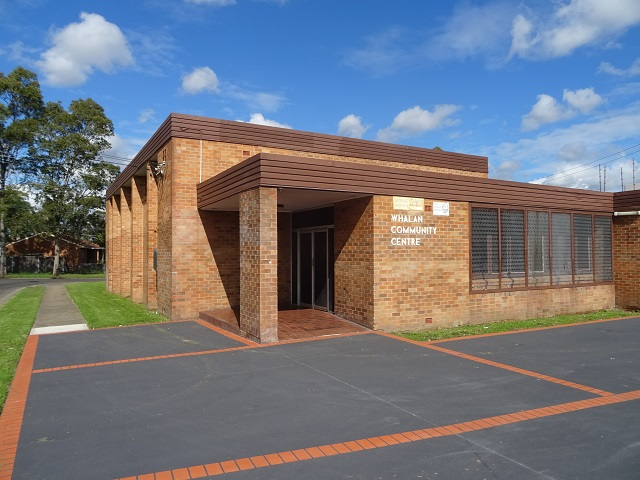
- Whalan Community Centre

- Interactive map of Whalan
- Country: Australia
- State: New South Wales
- City: Sydney
- LGA: City of Blacktown
- Location: 45 km (28 mi) west of Sydney CBD

Government
  - State electorate: Londonderry
  - Federal division: Chifley
- Elevation: 47 m (154 ft)

Population
  - Total: 5,929 (2021 census)
- Postcode: 2770
Suburbs around Whalan
| Tregear | Lethbridge Park | Emerton |
| St Marys | Whalan | Dharruk |
| Oxley Park | Mount Druitt | Mount Druitt |

Whalan is a suburb of Sydney, in the state of New South Wales, Australia. Whalan is located 45 kilometres west of the Sydney central business district, in the local government area of the City of Blacktown and is part of the Greater Western Sydney region.

== History ==
Whalan takes its name from James Whalan, who was granted 300 acres (1.2 km^{2}) at Mount Druitt by Governor Ralph Darling in 1831. His father was Sergeant Charles Whalan who was Governor Lachlan Macquarie's orderly sergeant and in charge of the Light Horse Guard. James Whalan explored the areas around Jenolan Caves and the Blue Mountains and discovered the rock formation known as Grand Arch pursuing the bushranger McKeown.

== Demographics ==
According to the 2021 census, there were 5,929 people in Whalan.

- 51.5% of people were female, and 48.5% of people were male.
- Aboriginal and Torres Strait Islander people made up 11.0% of the population.
- The most common ancestries were Australian 26.6%, English 22.7%, Australian Aboriginal 10.2%, Samoan 6.4%, and Filipino 4.9%.
- 61.2% of people were born in Australia. The next-most common countries of birth were New Zealand 3.7%, Philippines 3.5%, Samoa 2.4%, Fiji 1.8% and England 1.1%.
- 61.2% of people spoke only English at home. 33.5% of people spoke a non-English language at home. Some of the other languages spoken at home included Samoan 4.1%, Arabic 3.7%, Tagalog 2.1%, Hindi 1.9%, and Tongan 1.8%.
- The most common responses for religion were No Religion 27.0%, Catholic 21.4%, Not Stated 11.4%, and Anglican 10.5%, and Islam 8.1%.
- The most common occupations included Machinery Operators and Drivers 22.4%, Labourers 14.6%, Clerical and Administrative Workers 14.3%, Technicians and Trades Workers 11.5%, Community and Personal Service Workers 11.2%, Sales Workers 9.0%, Professionals 8.5%, and Managers 5.9%.

== Parks & Recreation ==
Whalan has an extensive reserve that is made up of four soccer fields and four football fields. It also has numerous parks and a large go-cart track that is available to use every Saturday. As well there are numerous smaller parks and reserves dotted around the leafy suburb including RAAF Park on the eastern boundary. This park is a memorial to the RAAF camp that was on the site during WW2. There was also an airfield nearby with the runway still in existence as the main road access to Whalan Reserve. The old Mt Druitt motor racing track used to run along this runway and parts of Luxford Road and Kuringai Ave prior to the NSW Housing Commission developing the area in the mid-1960s.

== Schools ==
Whalan has three public schools: Whalan Public, Madang Public and the special education school, Halinda.

Whalan High School was closed in 1999 following a reorganisation of several high schools in the area. In 2000, it briefly reopened as Chifley College Senior campus before closing permanently two years later. The school's operations were moved to a new site in Mount Druitt while the old site sat vacant for several years. In 2015, the NSW state government allotted $20 Million towards the construction of a new Aboriginal Centre for Excellence. The existing buildings were retained while upgrades and new fittings were added. The new facility was delivered in 2018, with Halinda, Kimberwalli, and PCYC using its facilities.
