= Imperial Hotel, Rooty Hill =

Imperial Hotel
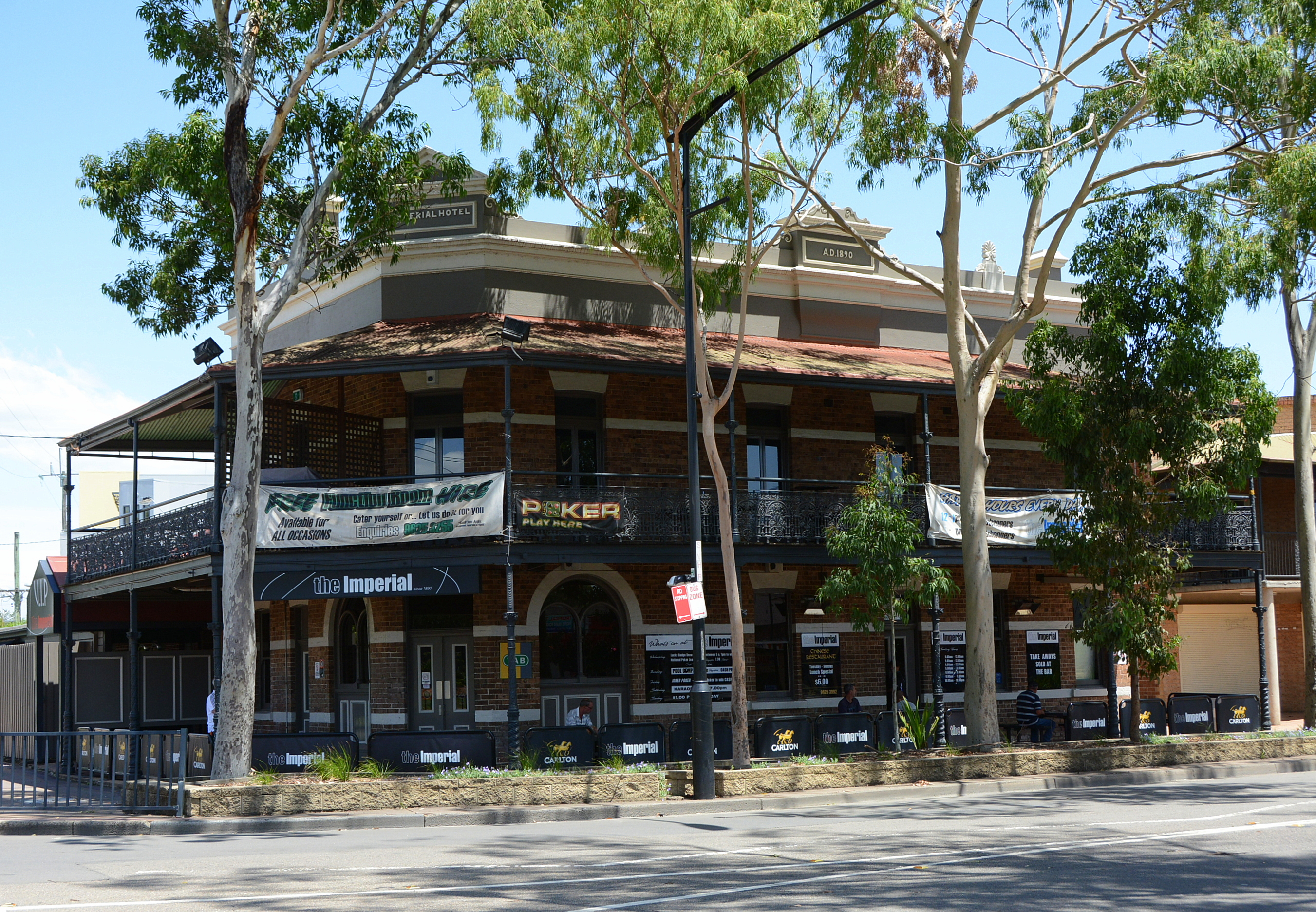
- Imperial Hotel, 2016

- Location within Sydney
- 33°46′17″S 150°50′36″E
- Location: 1 Rooty Hill Road North, Rooty Hill, City of Blacktown, Sydney, New South Wales, Australia

Site notes
- Owner: Dyemist Pty Ltd

New South Wales Heritage Register
- Official name: Imperial Hotel
- Type: state heritage (built)
- Designated: 2 April 1999
- Reference no.: 114
- Type: Hotel
- Category: Commercial

Imperial Hotel is a heritage-listed Australian pub at 1 Rooty Hill Road North, Rooty Hill, New South Wales, a suburb of Sydney. The property is owned by Dyemist Pty Ltd. It was added to the New South Wales State Heritage Register on 2 April 1999.

== History ==
The Imperial Hotel was built as two storeys in 1890 to cater for the crowds who arrived by train to attend the greyhound racing at Plumpton. F. J. Weston of Horsley Park developed the hotel that was opened on 12 August 1890. At the time Rooty Hill was part of the St. Mary's Parish. The locality was identified on maps as early as 1803 and known by the name of Rooty Hill by 1810.

The area is associated with government administration with a reserve for Government owned cattle. It is identified with a number of prominent landowners, including Walter Lamb who established a cannery and fruit preserving works at his Woodstock estate in Plumpton (Rooty Hill) in 1884, in addition to his pastoral activities. It was also the locality of early wine growing at Minchinbury, the estate of Dr Charles Mackay, to the south of the railway line. The Great Western Railway line gave impetus to the development of Rooty Hill, with the railway station serving the vineyards and the cannery. A public school was opened in 1875 and the School of Arts (1902) was the venue for the first meeting of Blacktown Council in 1906. Blacktown was proclaimed a shire in 1906.

At the time of the hotel's opening Rooty Hill appears to have been a growing centre with a number of local shops and private residences, which were augmented by the hotel. The hotel prospered early on with crowds attracted to the coursing (a form of greyhound racing) which was established at Lamb's Woodstock Coursing Track. The racetrack was a focus for local community activity, but business went into decline and the licence to sell beer was transferred to Wallacia in 1936.

It operated as a wine bar owned by Penfolds Wines, but became semi-derelict by the early 1970s. A local dentist purchased the hotel in 1977, when the hotel was boarded up. The National Trust classified the property in 1976, leading to a PCO in 1981. Building applications were lodged with council 1981-82 and the hotel reopened in 1982.

A single storey extension was constructed in c. 1995 along North Parade filling in a semi-enclosed courtyard. A pepper tree (Schinus molle var. areira) in the beer garden area near North Parade appears to be 40 to 50 years old. There is evidence of past specimens of pepper trees on this site.

Renovations were conducted on the entry foyer in 1987, and accommodation was converted to office space in 1990. Further restoration works, alterations and additions were carried out in 1995.

== Description ==
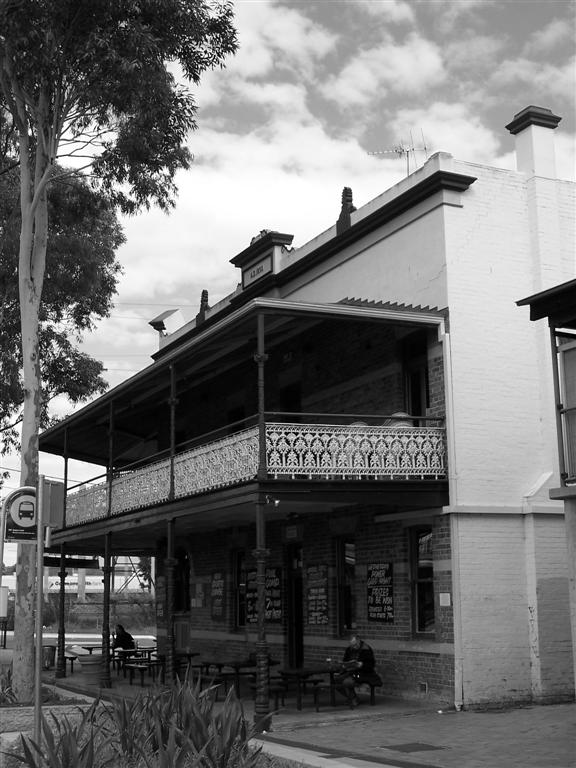
Imperial Hotel, 2007

A two-storey corner hotel in brickwork and cement render with verandah to the street frontage at the first floor level having cast iron lace balustrading and cast iron columns. The hotel abuts the corner, with a beer garden to the southwest alongside North Avenue, and car parking area to the north facing Rooty Hill Road. A number of additions have been made to the rear of the building over time, including a single storey section that has been altered, along with a c.1995 addition which infilled the courtyard facing North Parade which created a bistro at the rear.

It was reported as at 8 February 2007 that much of the internal original and early building fabric survives, including timber staircase, several fireplaces, various ceiling linings (plaster, timber and pressed metal), decorative plaster cornices and details. (1995).

== Heritage listing ==
The Imperial Hotel was built in 1890 to cater for the crowds who arrived by train to attend the greyhound racing at Plumpton. It is a significant architectural landmark and social meeting point.

Imperial Hotel was listed on the New South Wales State Heritage Register on 2 April 1999.
