= RYH =

RYH may refer to:

- RYH, the National Rail station code for Rye House railway station, Hoddesdon, Hertfordshire, England
- RYH, the Sydney Trains station code for Rooty Hill railway station, New South Wales, Australia
