= Sydney Coliseum Theatre =

Theatre in western Sydney, Australia

- Location within Sydney
- Former names: Western Sydney Performing Arts Centre (planning/construction)
- Address: 55 Sherbrooke St; Rooty Hill NSW 2766
- Location: Greater Western Sydney
- Coordinates: 33.771014°S 150.835337°E
- Owner: West HQ Limited
- Capacity: 2,200
- Public transit: Rooty Hill railway station

Construction
- Groundbreaking: 20 November 2017
- Opened: 12 December 2019
- Cost: $100 million
- Architect: Cox Architecture
- Project manager: Maddison Property Pty Ltd
- Structural engineer: Samaras Structural Engineers
- Services engineer: Taylor Thomson Whitting
- General contractor: Hansen Yuncken

Website
- Venue Website

The Sydney Coliseum Theatre is a multi-mode lyric theatre in Rooty Hill, New South Wales, Australia, which opened in December 2019. It lies alongside Rooty Hill RSL Club, and was entirely funded by the organisation behind the club.

The 2,200 seat auditorium can accommodate theatrical performances, corporate events, conferences and other attractions. Designed by Cox Architecture, it was built in just over two years. Its opening season featured Keith Urban, David Campbell, the Sydney Symphony Orchestra, Dame Edna Everage, Tina Arena, and John Butler.

It is part of West HQ, a precinct offering entertainment, fitness, lifestyle and accommodation in the Greater Western Sydney Region.

In 2022, filming of Australia's Got Talent and Australian Idol took place at the venue.
