= St Agnes Catholic High School =

Catholic school in Sydney, New South Wales, Australia

St Agnes Catholic High School.
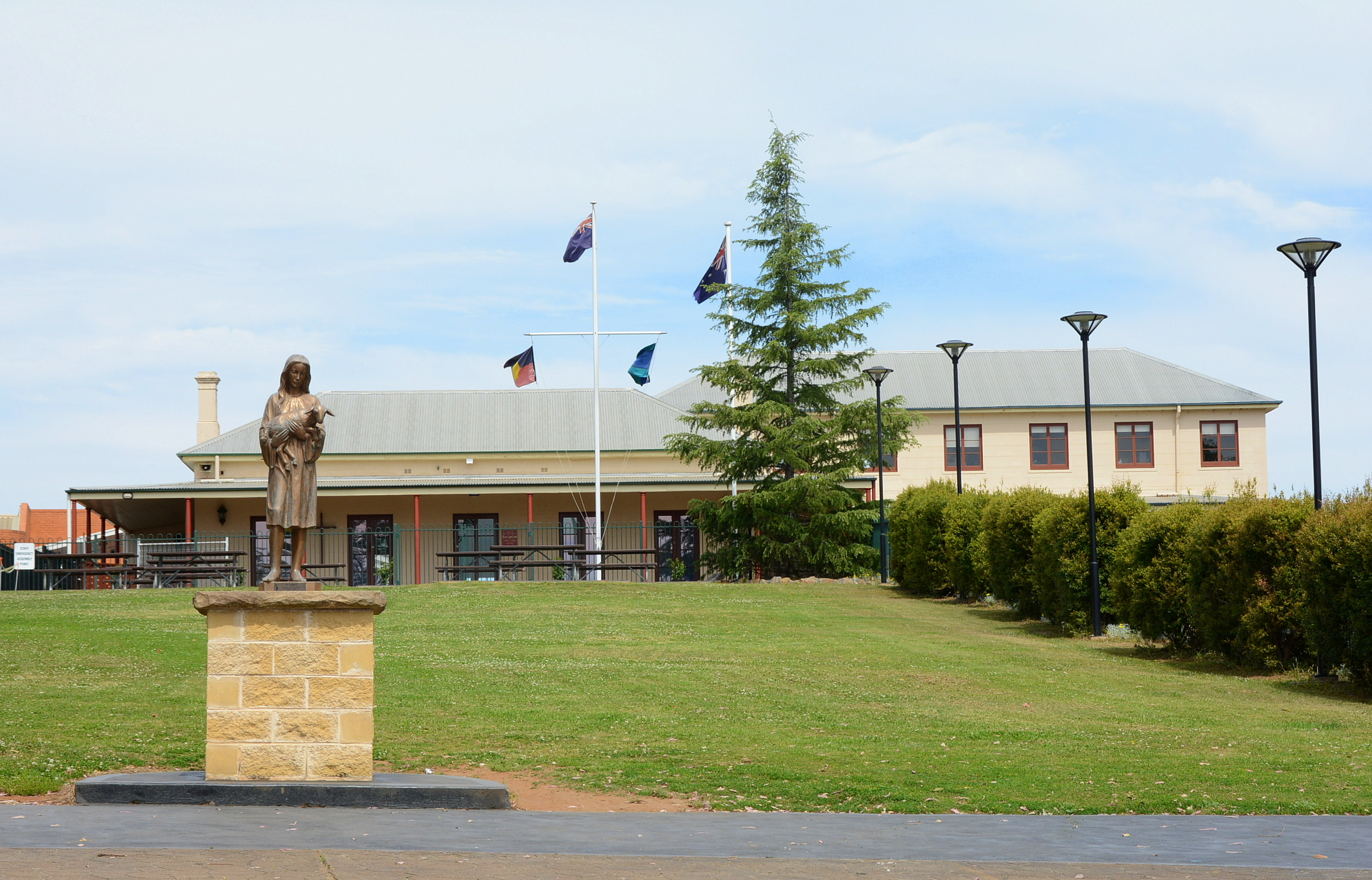
- Historic Fairholme, now part of St Agnes

Location
- Rooty Hill, western Sydney, New South Wales; Australia; 33°46′55″S 150°50′55″E

Information
- Type: Independent co-educational secondary day school
- Motto: To Truth Through Love
- Religious affiliation: Franciscan Missionaries of Mary
- Denomination: Roman Catholicism
- Established: 1962; 64 years ago
- Educational authority: New South Wales Department of Education
- Principal: Jeanette Holland
- Years: 7–12
- Enrolment: 800
- Campus type: Suburban
- Colours: Navy blue, yellow, white, black
- Feeder schools: St Aidan's Primary, Rooty Hill; Sacred Heart Primary, Mount Druitt; St John Vianney's Primary, Doonside
- Website: www.stagnesrootyhill.catholic.edu.au

St Agnes Catholic High School is an independent Roman Catholic co-educational secondary day school, located in Rooty Hill, in the western suburbs of Sydney, New South Wales, Australia. The school caters for approximately 800 students from Year 7 to Year 12, drawing enrollments from St Aidan's Primary, Rooty Hill, Sacred Heart Primary, Mount Druitt, and St John Vianney's Primary, Doonside, as well as a number of other schools in the surrounding suburbs. It also serves the parishes of St Aidan's Rooty Hill, Sacred Heart South Mount Druitt, Holy Family Emerton and St John Vianney's Doonside.

== Crest and motto ==
The St Agnes Catholic High School crest contains features of crests that schools established by the Franciscan Missionaries of Mary have. The barque represents the journey that the Franciscan Missionaries of Mary took to other lands to spread the Catholic Faith. The Greek letters, ρ and χ on the sail of the barque are the first letters of the Latin, Christus Resurexit - Christ is risen. The motto "To Truth Through Love" is used by all Franciscan Missionaries of Mary schools to highlight the schools' approach to educating the whole person.

== History ==
When St Agnes' College (as it was originally called) was established in 1962 by the Franciscan Missionaries of Mary, the school had 29 female students and three staff members, including founding Principal Sister Marcionelle (Burtille Hayes). In 1976, the school administration was handed over to laypersons when the Franciscan Missionaries of Mary transferred the school to the Sydney Archdiocese.

The original building (now the administrations block) has a long history, having been granted by Governor Evans to a Rooty Hill station master, Captain Minchin, in the 1880s. In 1936, the building, dubbed "Fairholme", began use as a guest house, eventually becoming a golf clubhouse before being purchased by the Epileptic Society and, later, the Franciscan Missionaries of Mary. The school was opened to male students in 1979. 20 years later, in 1999, it was incorporated into Christ Catholic College, but separated out again in 2004 when a multi-school review determined that it and other schools bundled in Christ Catholic Church should function separately.

The first Stage 6 classes commenced with Year 11 in 2019 and these students graduated at the end of 2020. With this came additional classrooms and facilities including the refurbishment of older classrooms and the construction of new buildings which reflect contemporary learning.

The school maintains a Franciscan focus on simplicity, tolerance and Christianity.

== See also ==
- List of Catholic schools in New South Wales
- Catholic education in Australia
