= Rooty Hill historic site =

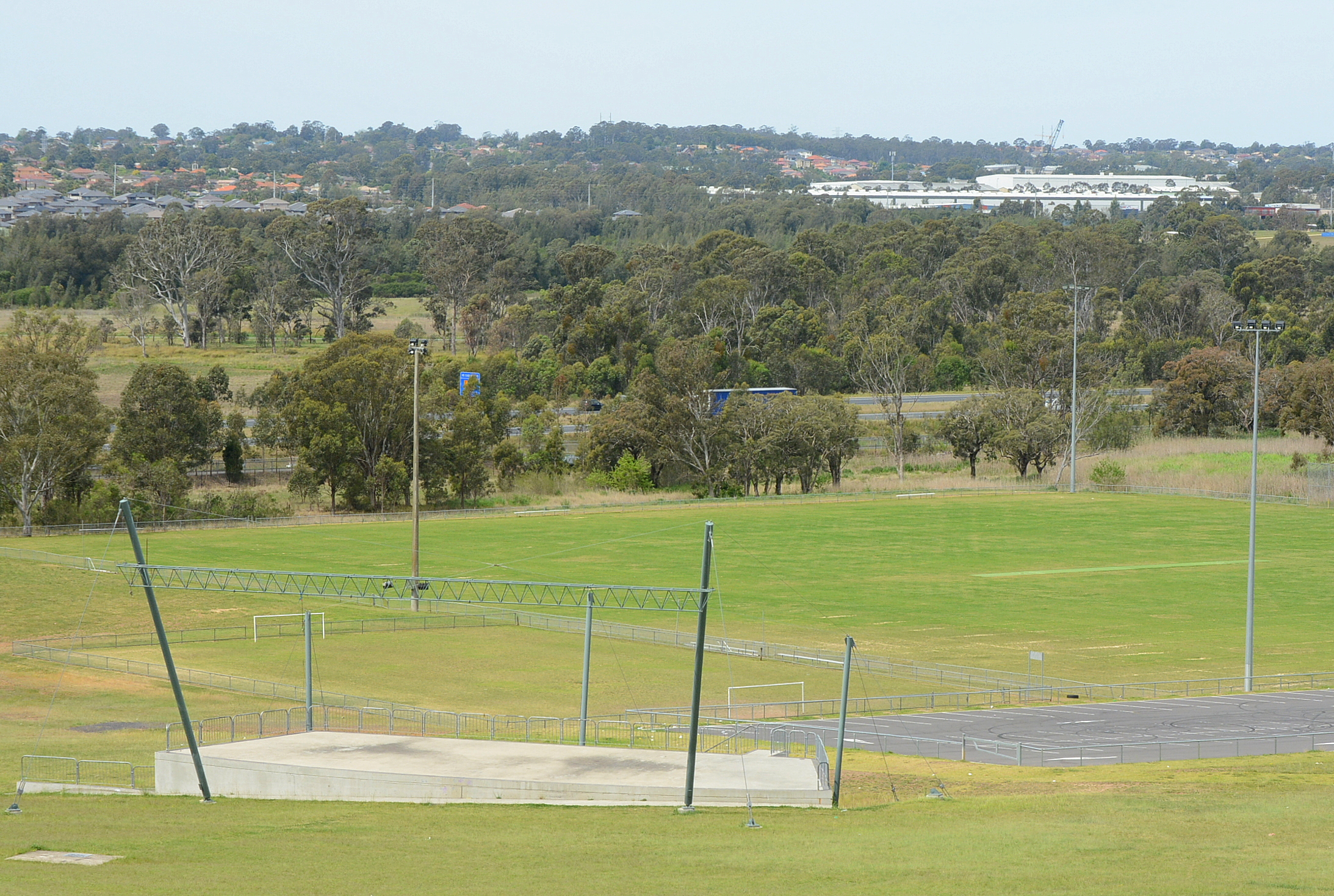
- View from the Rooty Hill looking across Morreau Reserve, 2015

- Location within New South Wales Location within Australia
- 33.7773°S 150.8525°E
- Location: Eastern Road, Rooty Hill, City of Blacktown, New South Wales, Australia

History
- Built: 1802–1828

Site notes
- Owner: Presbyterian Church (NSW) Property Trust

New South Wales Heritage Register
- Official name: The Rooty Hill; Morreau Reserve
- Type: state heritage (landscape)
- Designated: 13 June 2007
- Reference no.: 1756
- Type: Historic Landscape
- Category: Landscape - Cultural

Rooty Hill is a heritage-listed historic site and now parkland at Eastern Road, Rooty Hill, City of Blacktown, New South Wales, Australia. It was built from 1802 to 1828. It is also known as The Rooty Hill and Morreau Reserve. The property is owned by the Presbyterian Church (NSW) Property Trust. It was added to the New South Wales State Heritage Register on 13 June 2007.

== History ==
Prior to European settlement the area was occupied by the Dharug people. A significant stone artefact scatter relating to pre-contact Aboriginal use has been identified on the site indicating the potential importance of the site for research. According to oral testimony, the significance of the site for Aboriginal people continued in post contact years as it provided an important unofficial or hidden gathering and camping site for people moving between Sydney Parramatta and the rest of the State.

A close examination of the documentation of Governor Phillip's first exploration of Parramatta's western hinterland in April 1788 reveals that the orthodox view that he went only as far as Prospect Hill or a little beyond is deeply flawed. His party is much more likely to have traversed Toongabbie, Seven Hills and Blacktown to climb Bungarribee Hill, Doonside and reaching Eastern Creek and Rooty Hill.

The hill was named the Rooty Hill by Governor King and was included in one of the four reserves of land for government stock runs. It is most likely that it was named after a hill of similar geological form on Norfolk Island where the Governor had been posted ten years prior to his appointment to New South Wales.

In order to build up the colony's stock reserves and as a failsafe against food shortages, Governor King reserved 15,672.72 hectares of land in the Prospect area. This reserve included the Hill and was known as the Rooty Hill Run.

There is much speculation about the source of the name Rooty Hill. Mr William Freame wandered much in these parts collecting information from old residents. In 1931 in an article in a country newspaper on place names he wrote regarding the name: "Old hands assure me that the hill received its name from the roots and other debris left around its bare fields when the Eastern Creek was in flood, and this appears to be a very reasonable deduction." Mrs Hawkins' description quoted later in the derivation does not appear reasonable. Captain J H Watson's version, he having been in India as a young man, derives the name from "ruti", the Hindustani word for bread. Governor Macquarie as a young man had also been in India, and if the settlement at the hill had been devoted to agriculture there would have been a connection, but it was a stock yard. A third and anonymous writer puts forward a Captain Thomas Rooty as a resident in the locality. Unfortunately no information can be found on him.

The district was used as a government stockyard, and in a lengthy list which Governor Macquarie prepared of the buildings and works erected during his regime between January 1810 and November 1821, we find the following:

"At Rooty Hill:
1. a brick built house of two stories high for the residence and accommodation of the superintendent and principal overseer of the Government stock at the station, reserving one room for the use of the Governor, when occasionally there, with kitchen, stables and other necessary out-offices and kitchen garden enclosed;
2. four paddocks of 50 acres, each enclosed for the grazing of young cattle and raising of wheat and maize for the use of the stock men;
3. temporary log huts or barracks for the accommodation of 20 stockkeepers, with small kitchen garden attached thereto.
NB: The station at Rooty Hill is the next principal one to Camden for the grazing of the Government horned cattle and horses, and consists of about 2428 hectares of land of a very superior description, and, as this grazing ground is centrally situated, being on the Great Western Road and only 10 miles distant from Parramatta, it ought not to be on any account alienated from the Crown.

Macquarie seems to have forgotten that he had already carved a large slice off the reservation by giving Major Druitt in October 1821 a grant of 404 hectares 'out of the Rooty Hill Government allotment on Ross's Creek'. Mount Druitt is a permanent reminder of this grant.

In 1824 Captain P. P. King, son of Governor King, was given a grant of 607 hectares, also part of the Rooty Hill establishment.

The "brick built house of two stories" still stands (1935), with galvanised iron roof (seen in a photo) where once it was shingle-rooved. The oak tree (also shown in a photo) would have been small in Macquarie's time, but is now a veteran, ... a sturdy sample of the genus' (sic).

On January 11, 1822 T. H. Hawkins arrived in Sydney with wife and 8 children and mother in law. A few months later he received an appointment as commissariat store keeper at Bathurst, and on April 5 set out from Sydney, at the head of a cavalcade of bullock wagons, carts, drays and belongings over the Blue Mountains to their new home. Late that night the party reached Rooty Hill, a distance of 42 kilometres from Sydney, the Government House was ready to receive them.

...Hawkins described the place "I could have been contented to remain there for ever - the house was good, and the land around like a fine wooded park in England".

Under Macquarie's governance the colony's stock farms were expanded and reorganised and were still seen as an important reserve of food for times of shortage and an effective means of wresting the stranglehold on food /meat prices from a "cartel of officers and wealthy settlers". In 1813 Macquarie instigated a system of government employed overseers and stock keepers to manage four government stock farms in the colony. He also ordered the construction of farm buildings, enclosures and accommodations.

Rooty Hill became the second-most important of the government stock farms and was allocated an overseer's residence with accommodation for the Governor and other visitors. The overseer's cottage was built in 1815 on the northern slopes of The Rooty Hill (now across Eastern Road from The Rooty Hill). This site was possibly chosen as the Hill would have as surely offered protection from the elements. The Rooty Hill remained a part of the stock farm at this stage.

An inquiry into the colony's agricultural development in 1822 criticised the expense of the government stock farms and resulted in the reduction of the size of the Rooty Hill farm through grants of land on the perimeter of the reserve. Under Governor Brisbane the Rooty Hill stock farm was reduced further and in 1828 Governor Darling closed the Rooty Hill station giving over ownership of the remaining lands, including the Hill to the Church and Schools Corporation. When the Corporation failed in 1832 the land reverted to government ownership and was leased for grazing until 1865 when 134.87 hectares including The Rooty Hill was sold into the private ownership of Charles McKay. McKay donated a parcel of land on the south west edge of the Hill to the Baptist Church. This was later came into the ownership of the Presbyterian Church which retains ownership to this day.

The Hill remained in private ownership from the time of McKay's purchase up until 1975 when the land was resumed by the Planning Department as part of the Eastern Creek Open Space Corridor. In the early 1980s a planting and landscaping project was initiated on the Hill and the sporting fields, Morreau reserve were established. In 1992 ownership of the Hill was given to Blacktown City Council in order to establish an historic park there.

The Rooty Hill was grazed right up until the 1960s. It has also had a continuous history of community usage from the 1890s when the then owners, the Angus family sponsored regular community events such as the Queen Victoria's Jubilee celebrations. It has been the site of "unofficial community activity" - a popular courting spot, a patch of bush for children's adventures, Empire night celebrations. Recently it has become a venue for more official uses such as Council-organised Australia Day celebrations and Carols by Candlelight. The Rooty Hill has had an important function as a meeting place and camping site for post contact Aboriginal people travelling between Penrith and Parramatta.

In post-contact years Aboriginal people continued to use Rooty Hill. During the years when Aboriginal movement away from missions and Aboriginal reserves was restricted and closely monitored, Rooty Hill remained an unofficial or hidden gather place and camping site for people moving between Sydney and the Blue Mountains and the rest of the State. One Dharug elder indicated that the "South Creek mob" and the "Toongabbie mob" camped at Rooty Hill about three times a year, adding that they were not supposed to be travelling and were meant to stay on the Hargreave Mission at Warwick Farm. The last gathering of this person's family at Rooty Hill was in about 1962 when they met and made a temporary camp in the vegetation at the foot of Rooty Hill.

=== Modifications and dates ===
- 1802- reservation of 15672.8 hectares of land including the Rooty Hill for use as a stockrun
- 1815 - clearing of the Rooty Hill and surrounds for grazing and cropping
- 1865 - 1869 Establishment of Eastern road on the northern slope of the Hill
- c. 1890 - donation of a small lot of land on the South West edge to the Baptist Church and subsequent establishment of the Baptist church building
- Late 1890s the Rooty Hill is used for community events
- 1960s - cessation of grazing on the Hill
- c. 1980 Greenspace tree planting and landscape project - sporting field created and called Morreau Reserve

== Description ==
The curtilage includes the Rooty Hill, the Morreau Reserve and the parcel of land owned by the Presbyterian Church facing Rooty Hill Road South. It is bound by Rooty Hill Road South, Church St, Curry Street and Eastern Road . The Rooty Hill is a cleared grassy hill with patches of regrowth Cumberland Plainwoodland to the eastern, southern and south western lower slopes of the hill. It is one of the highest points between Parramatta and the Blue Mountains and its peak affords an expansive view of the Cumberland Plain.

The character of The Rooty Hill, as at 1 April 2005, as a grassy topped hill is the result of colonial land clearing and grazing activity during the years it was part of the stock farm and later when owned by the Church and Schools Corporation and then in private ownership (i.e.. 1802 - 1975). The donation of a parcel of land in the south west perimeter of the hill to the Baptist Church in 1890 and consequent cessation of grazing there, led to regrowth of Cumberland Plains Woodlands in that parcel of land. Since the 1960s grazing activity ceased over the whole of the area and there has been some associated regeneration of bushland.

While no archaeological investigations have taken place on the Hill, based on its landscape character, land use history and previous regional research, the Rooty Hill has been assessed as having moderate archaeological potential relating to Aboriginal and European artefacts and places.

== Heritage listing ==
The Rooty Hill is of State heritage significance as a remnant of one of the four Government Depots and stock farms first selected by Governor King in 1802 and further developed by Governor Macquarie after 1810. Under Macquarie, Rooty Hill Depot and stock farm developed as the second most important of the stock farms in colonial NSW. It functioned to provide an important reserve food supply for the colony during its establishment when it frequently faced crop failures, drought and other difficulties. The stock farm also enabled the government to control livestock prices and so prevent exploitation of the market by private graziers and contributed to the establishment of colonial breeding herds. An open stone artefact scatter has been located on the site indicating the site's potential as a research resource for Aboriginal history in the area. The hill also has significance to the Aboriginal community as a post contact camping and meeting place for those travelling over the Blue Mountains and into Parramatta and Sydney.

Rooty Hill was listed on the New South Wales State Heritage Register on 13 June 2007 having satisfied the following criteria.

The place is important in demonstrating the course, or pattern, of cultural or natural history in New South Wales.

The Rooty Hill is of heritage significance at a State level as a remnant of the Rooty Hill Government Depot and stock farm. It was established as the second most important of the stockfarms which were established by Governor King as a reserve for food in times of shortage. Macquarie further developed the stock farm as a place to strengthen and increase the colonial herds and as a mechanism of government intervention to control the supply and price of meat, grain and livestock and market monopolies by wealth property owners and military officers in the early years of the colony. It also represents the history of colonial government intervention in the release of land for settlement and private tenure.

The place has a strong or special association with a person, or group of persons, of importance of cultural or natural history of New South Wales's history.

The Rooty Hill has historic associations at a State level with Governor King. King named the Hill Rooty Hill and declared the colonial reserve which included the Hill. The later development and history of the Stock farm which included the Rooty Hill is associated with Governor Macquarie,.

The Rooty Hill has local heritage significance for its association with several early local families including Dr Charles McKay who through a series of shrewd purchases became a large landowner in the area. His holdings included much of the land between the Western Highway, the Great Western Railway, Rooty Hill Road South and Rupertsworth Road. He was responsible for developing the Minchinbury vineyards. Another important association is with James Angus who purchased many of McKay's holdings and including Rooty Hill and the Minchinbury Estate which he continued to successfully develop. He is credited with establishing the Champagne industry in NSW.

The place is important in demonstrating aesthetic characteristics and/or a high degree of creative or technical achievement in New South Wales.

The Rooty Hill has aesthetic significance at a State level for its landmark qualities. It is one of the highest points between Parramatta, Penrith and the Blue Mountains. Its role as a distinguishing feature of the landscape is demonstrated by the fact that the government reserve of which the Hill was part, was named the Rooty Hill Run. In addition, the Hill and associated overseer's cottage provided a stopping point for colonial travellers on their way to the western areas of the state.

The landmark qualities of the Hill were also utilised by local Aboriginal people in post contact years. Groups of Aboriginal people travelling between Penrith and Paramatta used the Hill as a gathering place and camping site.

The appearance of the hill as a balded topped peak has remained and provides a strong visual link to its historical function as part of a colonial pastoral grazing run.

The place has strong or special association with a particular community or cultural group in New South Wales for social, cultural or spiritual reasons.

The Rooty Hill has high local significance as a place of special social associations for the local community. The hill figures in locals' memories as a place of informal recreation and gathering as well as its historic role as a venue for community events which began in the 1890s at the instigation of its then owner, James Angus.

The place has potential to yield information that will contribute to an understanding of the cultural or natural history of New South Wales.

The existence of an Open Stone Artefact Scatter site on the south eastern slopes of the Rooty Hill enhances its State Heritage Significance as a resource for archaeological research and makes it an important resource of technical and archaeological information relating to pre-contact Aboriginal culture. The existence of this site makes it highly likely that further evidence of Aboriginal archaeological resources will be found in investigation. Its close proximity and association with the Government and Stock farm makes it a potential site for European archaeological finds such as artefacts associated with grazing and farming.

The place possesses uncommon, rare or endangered aspects of the cultural or natural history of New South Wales.

The Rooty Hill contains regrowth Cumberland Plain Woodland in the Presbyterian church site on the southern perimeter of the Hill. This vegetation is important to the maintenance of the gene pool of local species.
