= Rooty Hill, New South Wales =

Rooty Hill
- Suburb
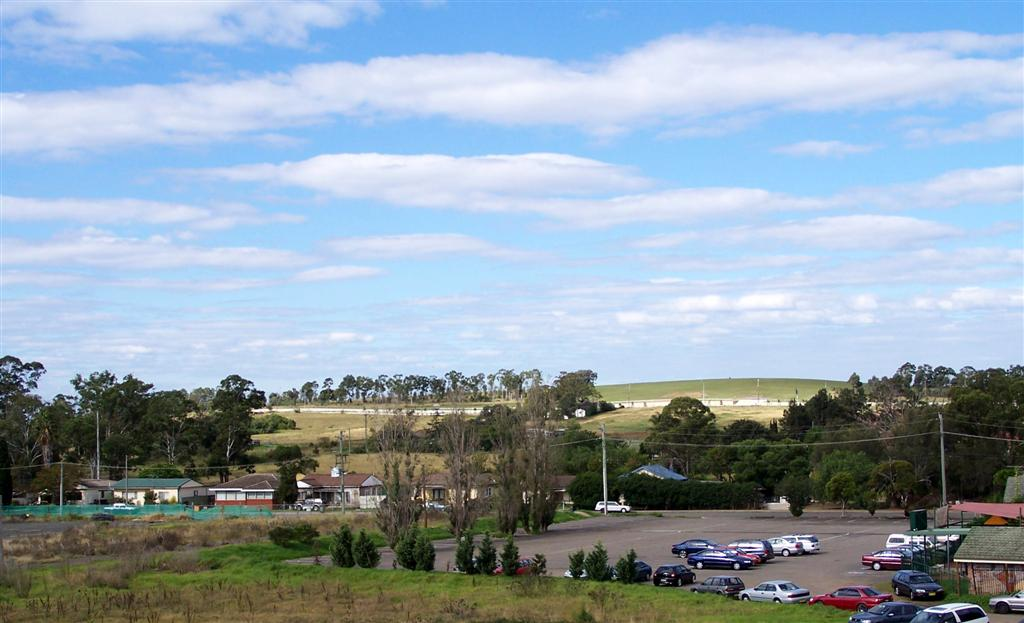
- Rooty Hill, seen from the railway station. In the background is the hill from which the area gets its name.

- Interactive map of Rooty Hill
- Country: Australia
- State: New South Wales
- City: Sydney
- LGA: City of Blacktown
- Location: 42 km (26 mi) west of Sydney CBD

Government
  - State electorate: Mount Druitt
  - Federal division: Chifley

Area
  - Total: 6.3 km^{2} (2.4 sq mi)
- Elevation: 42 m (138 ft)

Population
  - Total: 16,176 (2021 census)
  - Density: 2,568/km^{2} (6,650/sq mi)
- Postcode: 2766
Suburbs around Rooty Hill
| Whalan | Plumpton | Glendenning |
| Mount Druitt | Rooty Hill | Doonside |
| Colyton | Minchinbury | Eastern Creek |

Rooty Hill is a suburb of Sydney, in the state of New South Wales, Australia. Rooty Hill is located 42 kilometres (26 mi) west of the Sydney central business district, in the local government area of the City of Blacktown and is part of the Greater Western Sydney region.

== History ==
=== Pre-colonial (Aboriginal) era ===
Rooty Hill was broadly inhabited by the Darug people before European settlement.

=== Colonial era ===
The earliest exploration of the area was led by Captain Watkin Tench in 1789. The origin of this name puzzled historians for many years because the clue lay not in Blacktown City but on Norfolk Island. Governor Philip Gidley King had been in charge of the first settlement there in early 1788 and had noted that the hillside where he had built his Government House had been difficult to dig owing to the amount of tree roots beneath the surface. The hill on Norfolk became known as Rooty Hill and the name is now official. When King returned to New South Wales he built the headquarters for his government reserve of 1802 at the foot of a hill that reminded him of the Norfolk Island Rooty Hill and used the same name. The name Rooty Hill is first found on a map from 1803.

The early development of the area came when Captain William Minchin was given a grant of 400 hectares (1,000 acres) in 1819, leading to the development of the Minchinbury estate. Dr Charles McKay purchased the estate in 1859 and subdivided it in the 1880s. Afterwards, the Watts family built Watts Cottage in Watt Street. It combines Italianate elements with a bullnose verandah and is almost unique in the Blacktown Municipality. It is locally heritage-listed.

In 1890, the Imperial Hotel was built north of the railway station by F.J. Weston. It was intended to cater for the crowds who attended the greyhound racing at Lamb's Woodstock Coursing Track at Plumpton. By the early 1970s it had become semi-derelict, but was acquired by a local dentist in 1977. It reopened in 1982 and is now state heritage-listed.

In 1891, the Pioneer Memorial Church, located on Rooty Hill Road South, was built on land donated by Dr Charles McKay. It was originally a Baptist church, but was later acquired for the Presbyterian community by James Angus, owner of the Minchinbury estate from 1895. It is still in use and is locally heritage-listed.

=== Post federation ===
In 1902–1903, the School of Arts, located in Rooty Hill Road South, was built by the residents for community activities. The foundation stone was laid 1 November 1902, by Miss Angus, daughter of James Angus. It is locally heritage-listed.

On 13 April 1916, James Angus was killed at Rooty Hill railway crossing, as a result of being hit by that morning's express train. He was survived by his wife, his son James (of Adelaide), his son John (a pastoralist in New South Wales) and his daughter, who by that time was the widow Mrs Fleming.

The name of James Angus is preserved in Angus Avenue; Charles McKay's name survives in Dr Charles McKay Reserve; the name of the Evans family, who built Fairholme, survives in Evans Road. Fairholme, now part of the St Agnes Catholic High School, is locally heritage-listed.

=== Post war ===
During and following World War II, Australia had realised its demographic crisis in simply not having enough people, exacerbated by the threat of Japanese invasion. In response, Australia allowed immigration from more and more nations as previously restricted by the White Australia policy. In 1973, the Whitlam government effectively abolished the White Australia policy, meaning people would not be denied immigration due to their nationality. Notably, this allowed immigrants from Asia to come in, and in the ensuing decades, especially from the 1990s-2010s, many Filipinos, Indians, Pakistanis, Polynesians and Chinese immigrants populated Rooty Hill, rendering the suburb in the multicultural state it is in today.

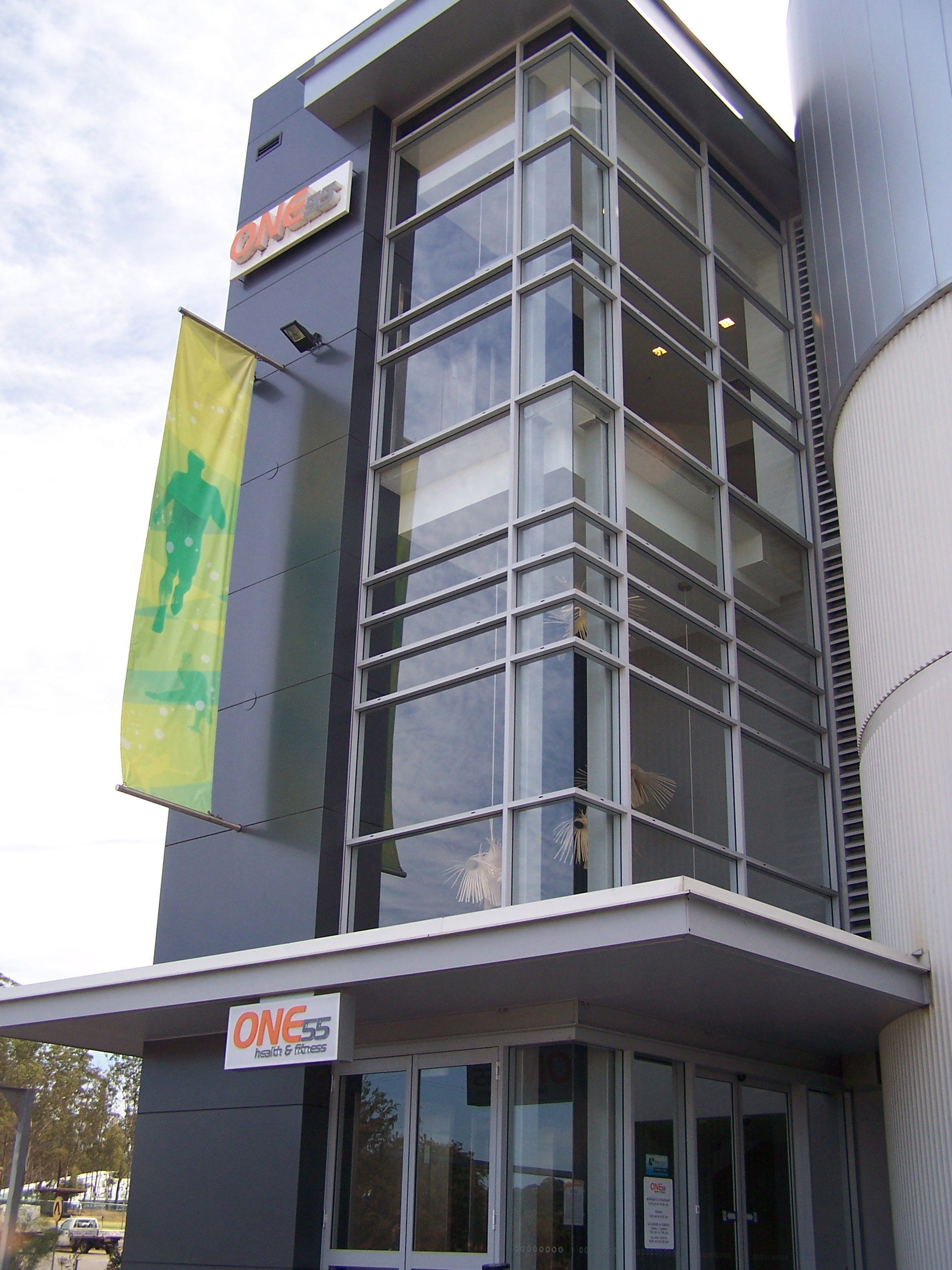
One55, the largest gym in Western Sydney

In 1964, the Rooty Hill RSL (now known as West HQ) was built, and over time turned into the largest licensed club in New South Wales, serving as a hub for entertainment, fitness and lifestyle. Dubbed by some as the "Vegas of the West", the RSL also has Western Sydney's largest gym, five star accommodation and conference facilities. Currently, the RSL has approximately 50,000 members.

== Heritage listings ==
Rooty Hill has a number of heritage-listed sites, including: Dunsmore Street: Government Depot Site

- Eastern Road: Rooty Hill
- 1 Rooty Hill Road: Imperial Hotel

== Demographics ==
In the 2021 Census, there were 16,176 people in Rooty Hill, 48.9% of who were male and 51.1% of who were female. The median age was 37, lower than Australia's national median of 38. The median weekly income was $2,001, higher than Australia's national median of $1,250. The average motor vehicles per dwelling was 1.9.

The most common ancestries were Filipino 21.0%, Australian 14.9% English 13.0%, Indian 8.3% and Pakistani 4.0%.

- 43.7% of people were born in Australia. The next most common countries of birth were Philippines 15.5%, India 5.3%, Pakistan 3.4%, Fiji 2.9% and New Zealand 2.3%.
- The most common responses for religion were Catholic 33.4%, Islam 12.4%, No religion 12.1% and Hinduism 9.6%.
- 40.3% of people only spoke English at home. Other languages spoken at home included Tagalog 9.7%, Filipino 5.1%, Urdu 5.0%, Hindi 3.6% and Arabic 2.6%.

== Sport and recreation ==
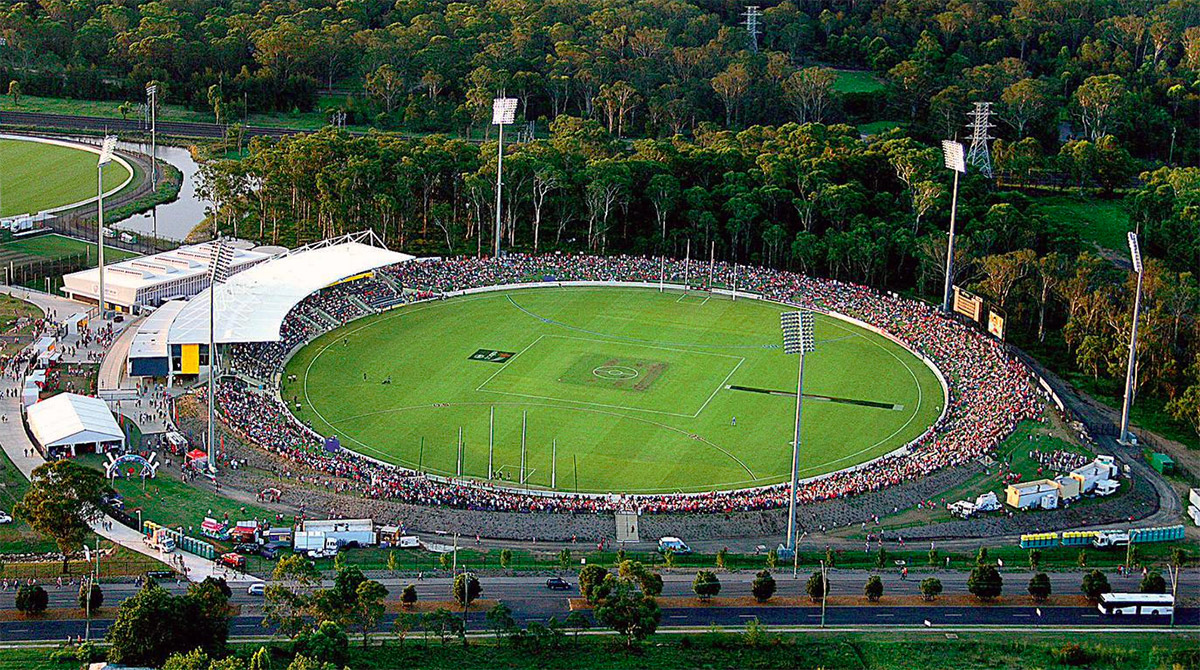
One of the cricket/AFL stadiums at BISP

Rooty Hill is home to the multi-sports Blacktown International Sportspark, which includes two cricket grounds (which have also been used for Australian rules football), an athletics track and field, three baseball diamonds, two soccer fields, four softball diamonds, administration centres and park land. It has been used as a training and administrative base for the Greater Western Sydney Giants from 2010 to 2012, and for the Western Sydney Wanderers FC since 2012. Since 2010 the Sydney Blue Sox of the Australian Baseball League have used the main baseball stadium as their home field. There is also a boutique stadium at the facility which hosts National Premier League fixtures for Blacktown Spartans FC.

West HQ is a central location for a variety of entertainment venues, such as the Zone Bowling centre, the Sydney Coliseum Theatre, numerous restaurants, a Novotel location, a gymnastics & aquatics centre and a gym.

Rooty Hill Skatepark opened in 2003. It features quarter pipes, various ledges, and a stair handrail.

== Commercial area ==
The main commercial area of Rooty Hill is primarily on Rooty Hill Road North and Rooty Hill Road South, surrounding the railway station, especially on Rooty Hill Road North. There is also a significant commercial area on the intersection of North Parade, Sherbrooke Street and Railway Street, where the Sydney Coliseum Theatre can be found.

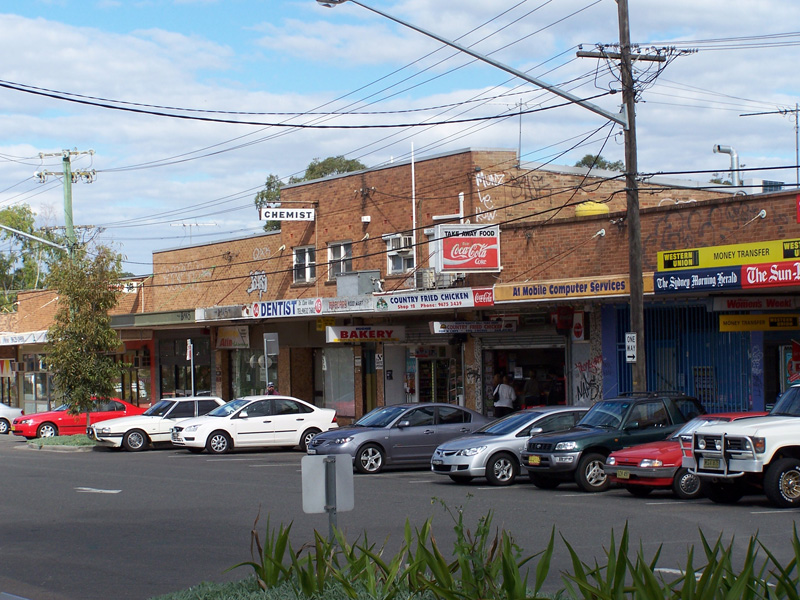
Rooty Hill Road South shops

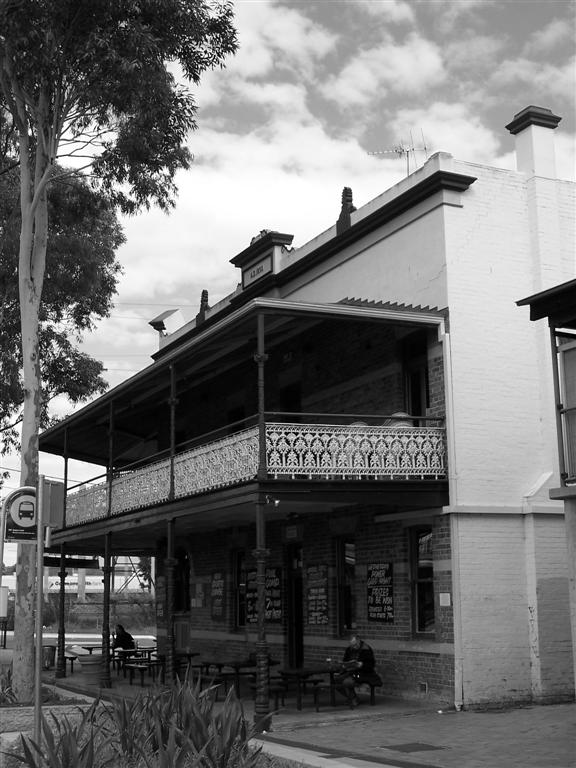
The Imperial Hotel, Rooty Hill Road North

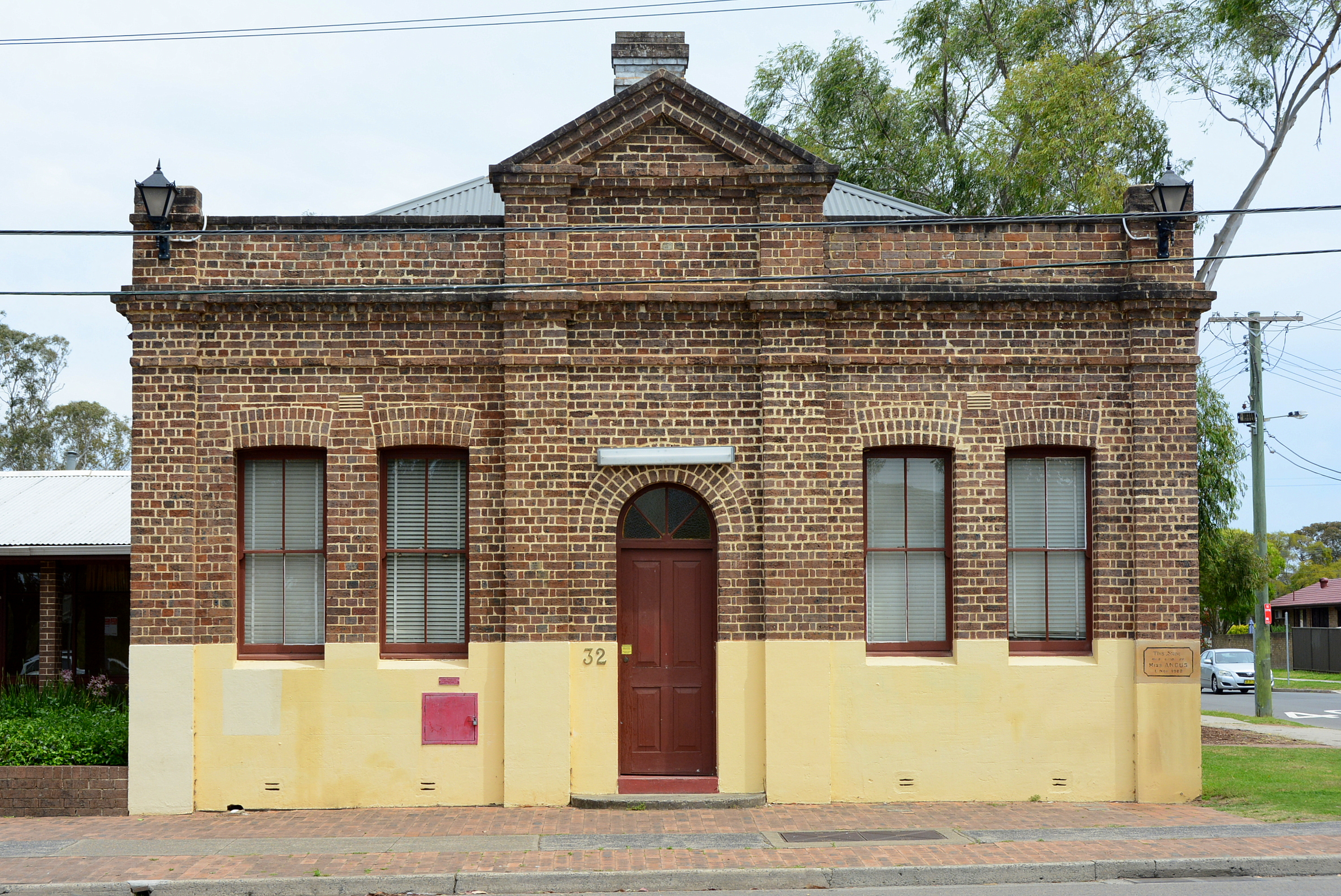
Rooty Hill School of Arts, built 1902

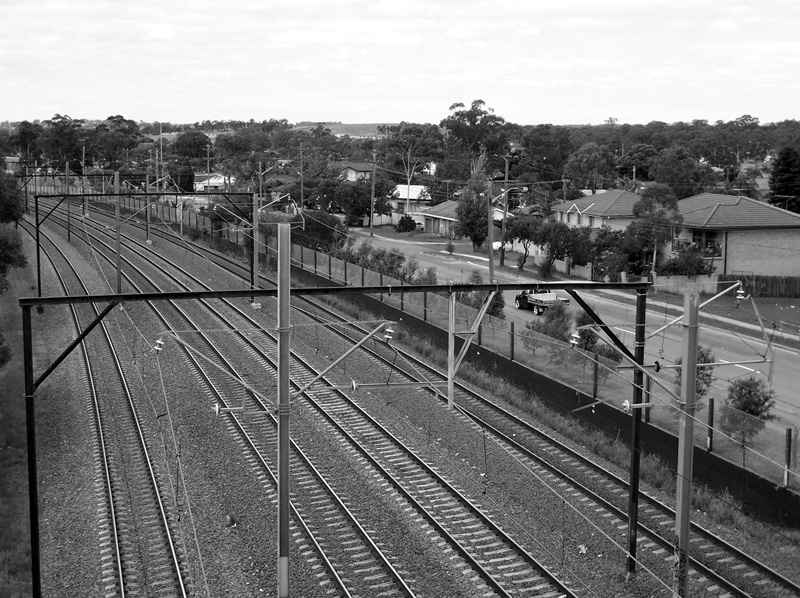
Railway line dividing Rooty Hill as seen from Davis overpass

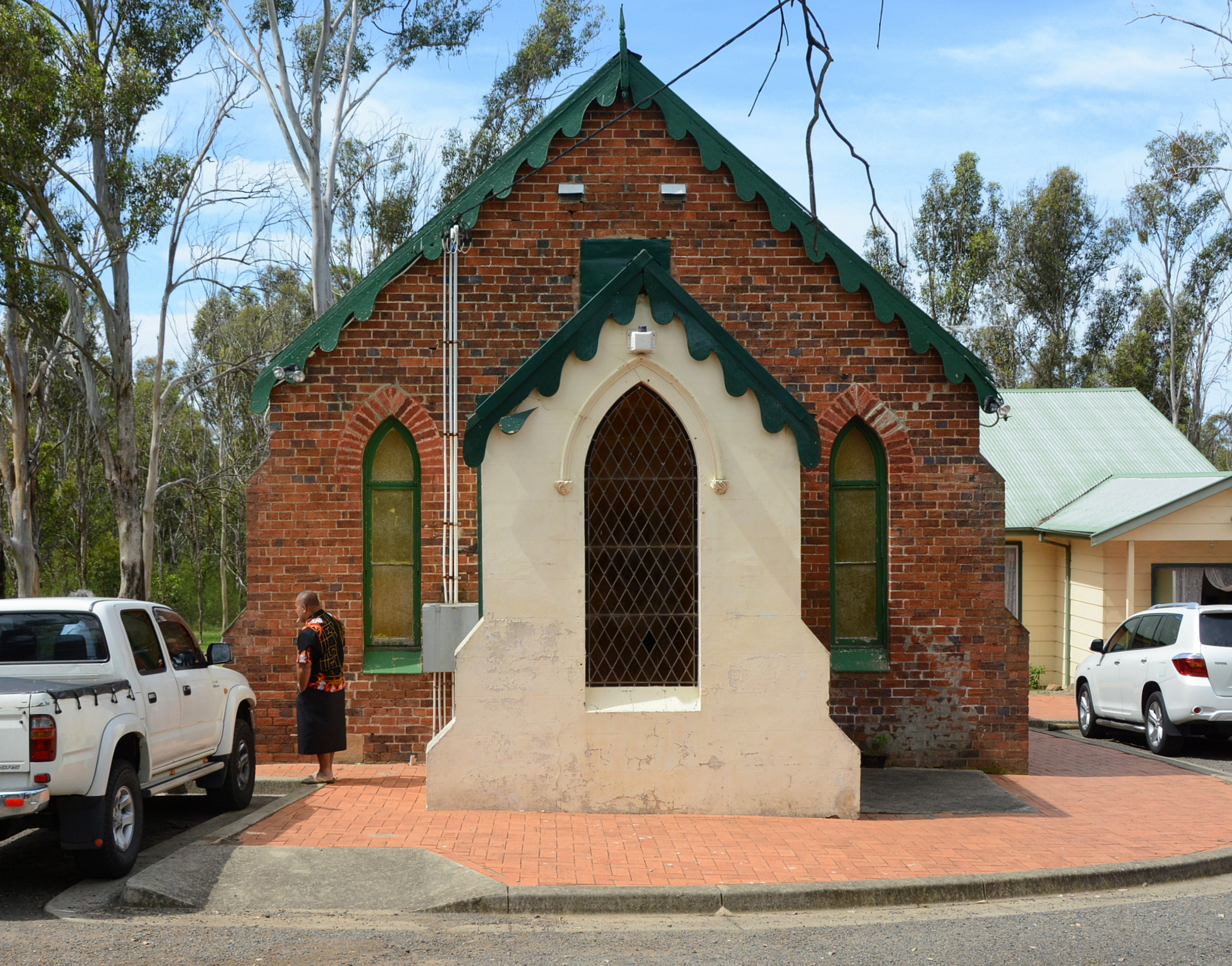
Heritage-listed Pioneer Memorial Church on Rooty Hill Road South

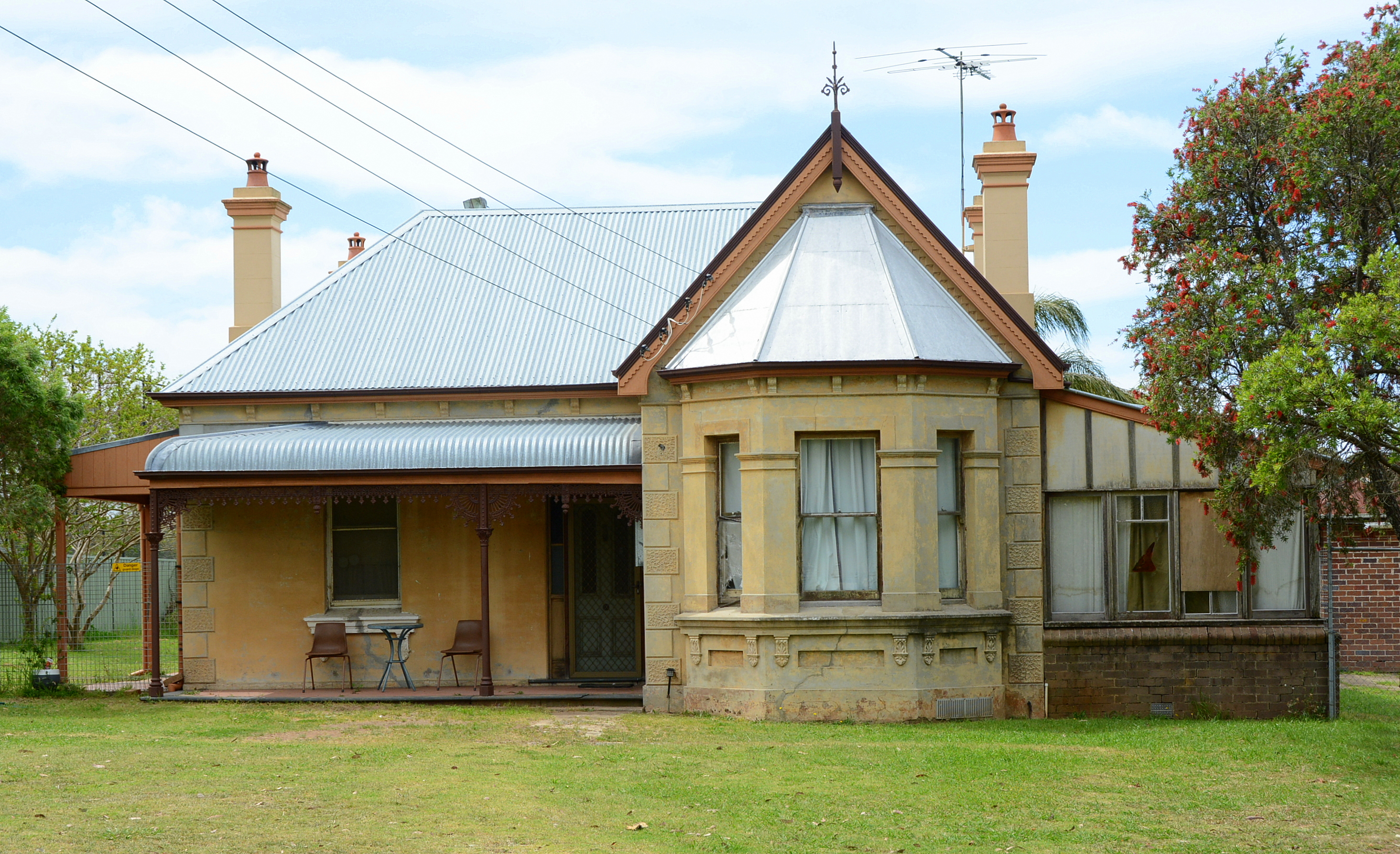
Watts Cottage, Watt Street

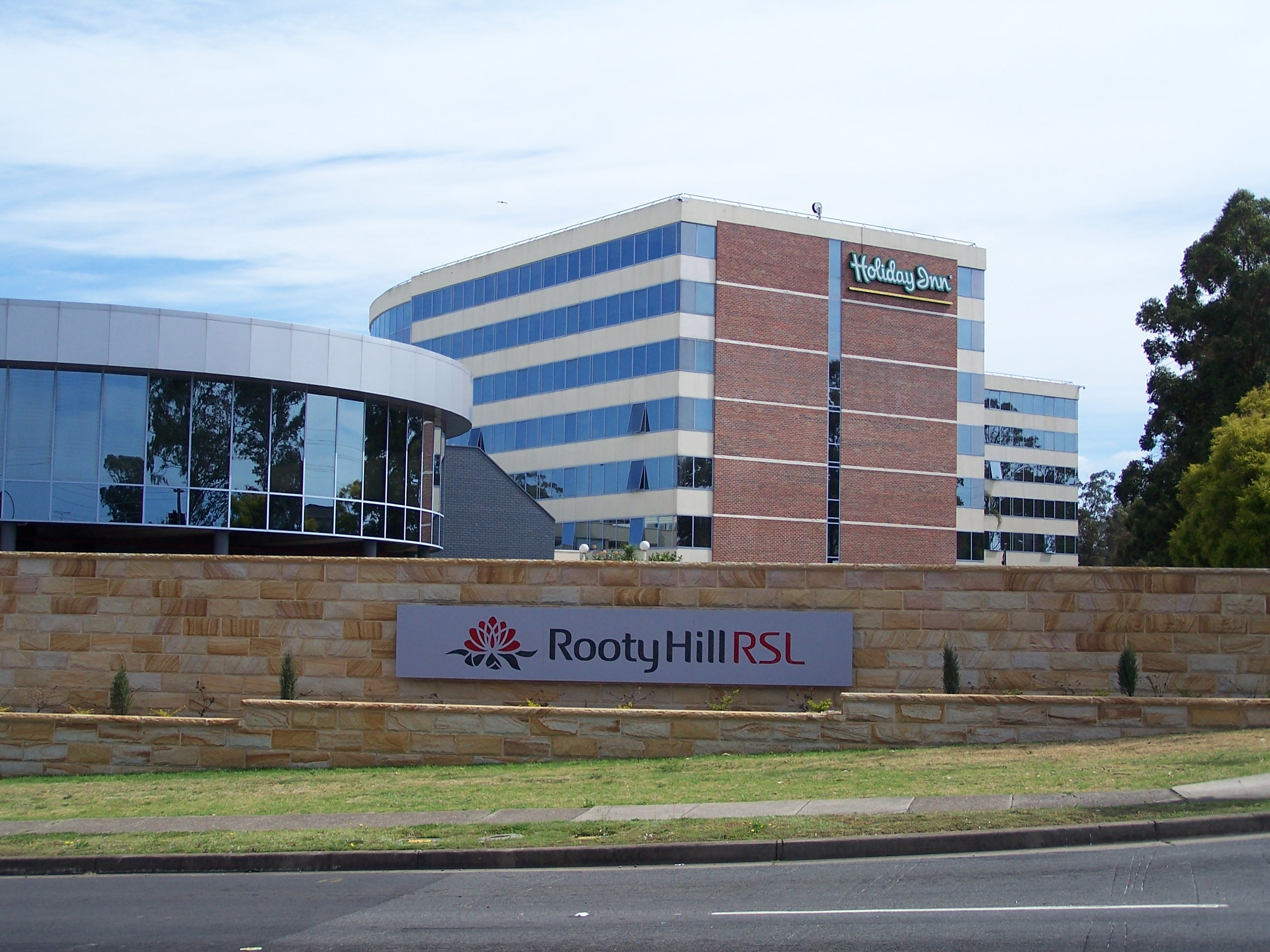
Rooty Hill RSL Club with Holiday Inn Rooty Hill

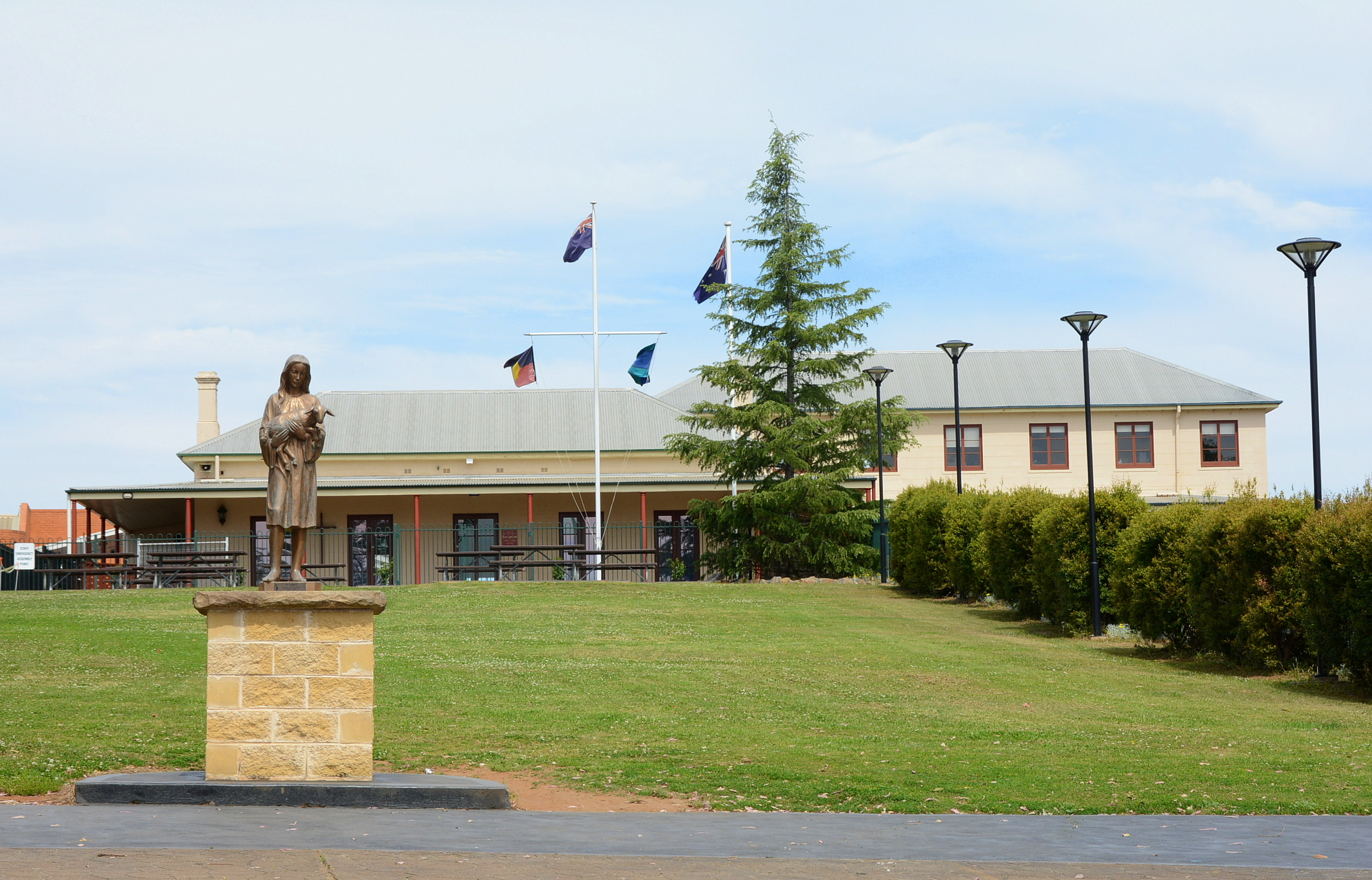
Fairholme, built by the Evans family, now part of St Agnes Catholic High School

== Schools ==
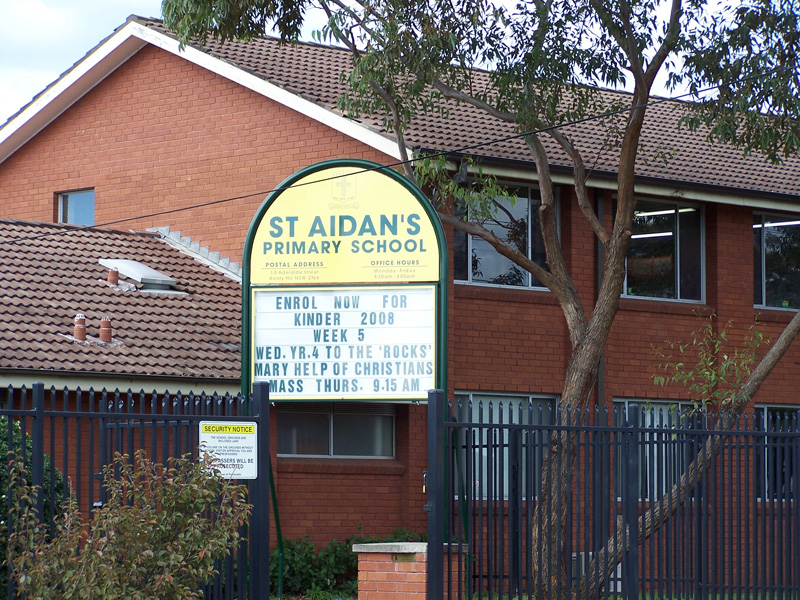
St. Aidan's Primary School

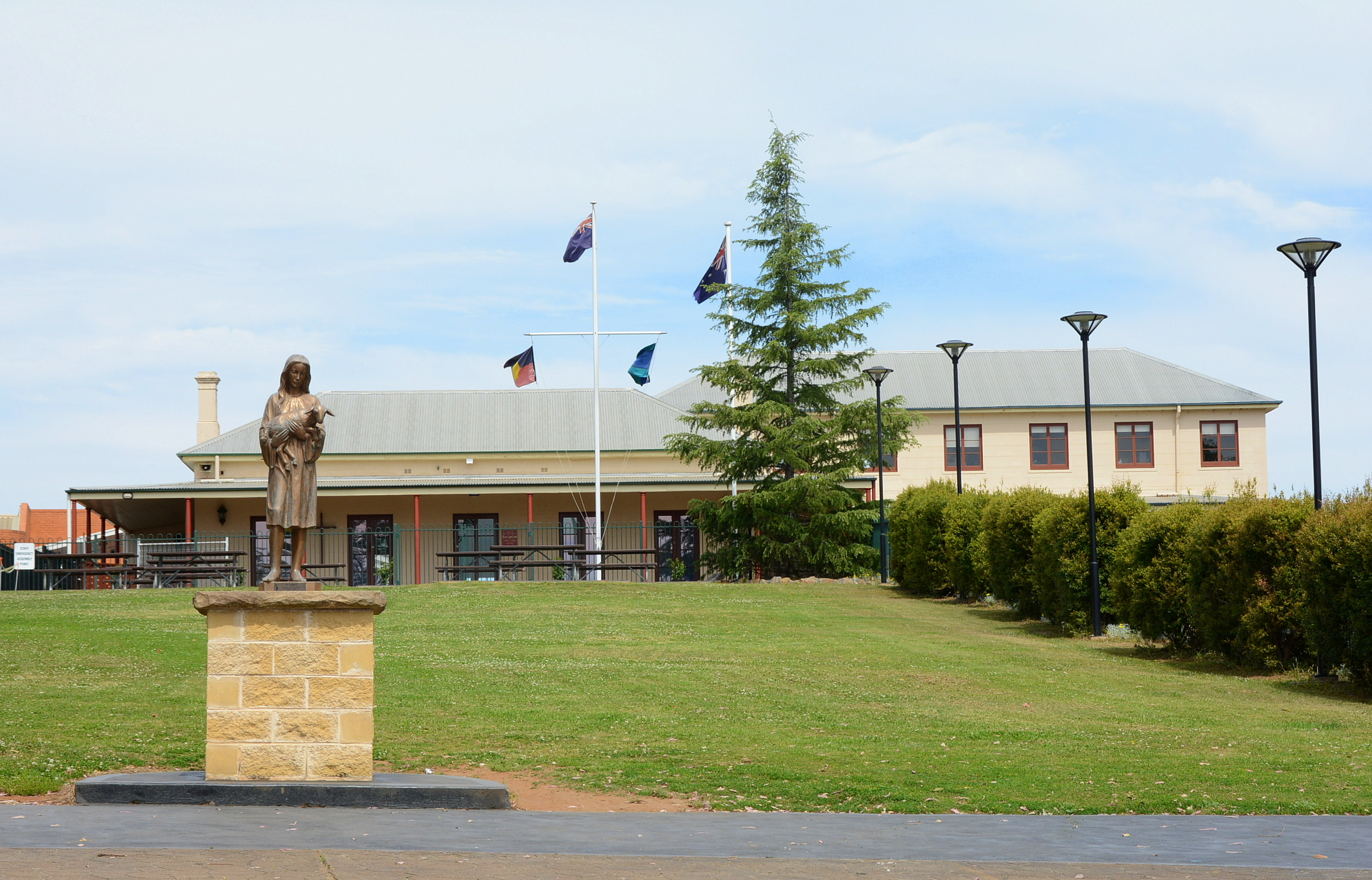
St Agnes Catholic High School

- Rooty Hill Public School is a New South Wales public school providing education from Kindergarten to Year 6. It has been on Rooty Hill Road North since its opening in 1957 with 114 students. The entire class of the opening year attended the 50th anniversary celebrations held in May 2007. Member for Chifley, Roger Price commented that "the influence a school can have on a student lasts their lifetime. Having the entire class of 1957 at the (50th anniversary) celebration shows just how positive that can be".
- St. Aidans Primary School (Kindergarten-Year 6), located in Adelaide Street, was founded in 1907.
- St. Agnes Catholic High School (Years 7–10), Evans Road, Rooty Hill is a secondary school located in Rooty Hill South. Established in 1962, the school is a part of the Christ Catholic College Community of schools which was established in 1999, and which is a system of three schools that broke apart in 2004 - the other two schools being Clare Catholic High School in Hassall Grove, and Loyola Senior High School in Mt Druitt, which is the only Senior High School in the Parramatta Diocese. In late 2004, St Agnes underwent a major building development, with a new building containing six classrooms, a library and an undercroft, which would provide easy access to the school hall. In late 2007, the school underwent a whole-campus redevelopment.
- Rooty Hill High School (Years 7–12). North Parade, Rooty Hill. Rooty Hill High School is a comprehensive, 7 to 12 community school.

== Transport ==
=== Trains ===
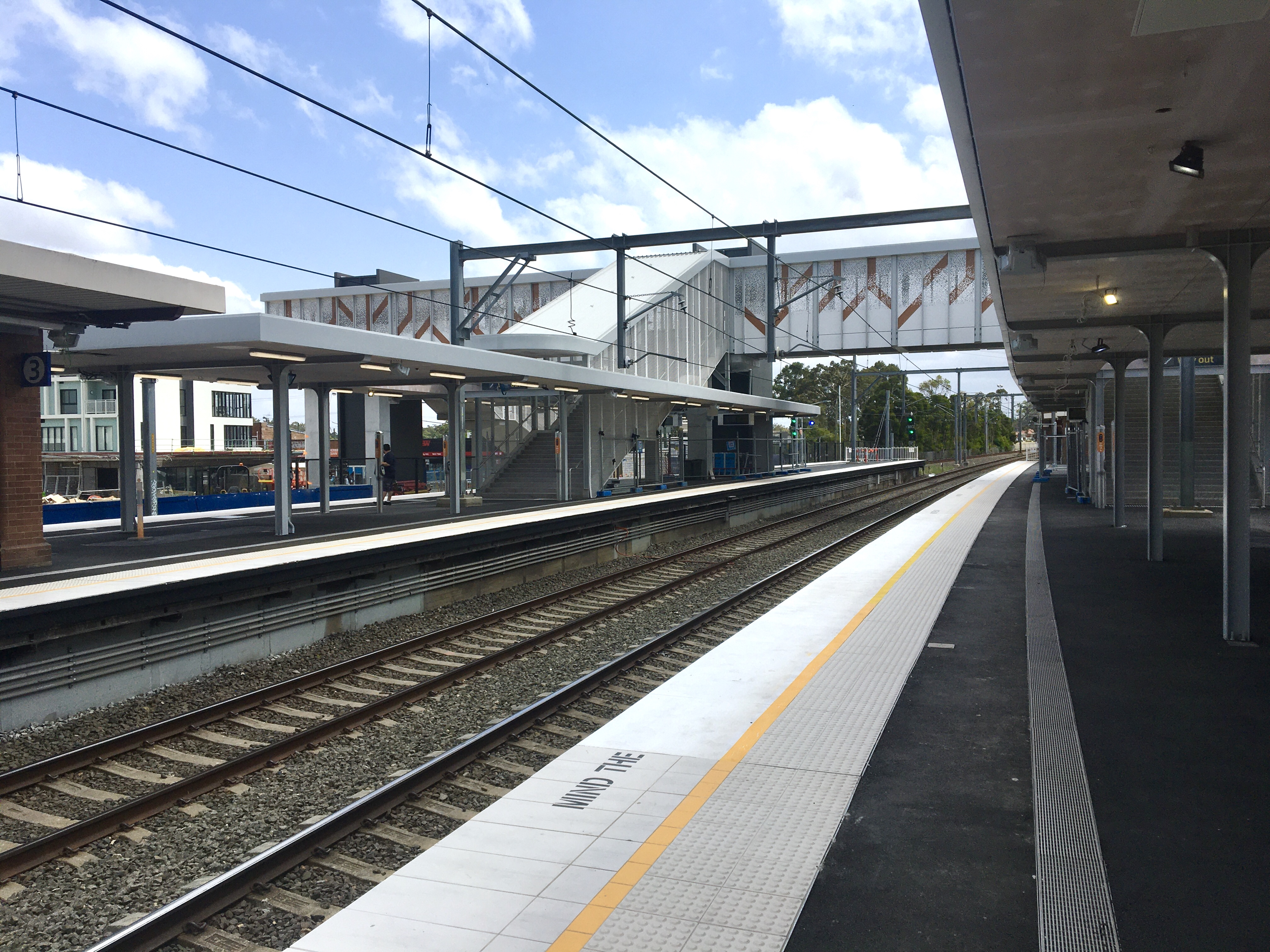
Rooty Hill station in November 2019

Rooty Hill railway station is on the Main Western railway line. Rooty Hill station opened on 23 December 1861 as the terminus of the Main Western line when it was extended from Blacktown. On 1 May 1862, the line was extended to St Marys. The station was rebuilt in the 1940s. In 2020, a station upgrade was completed, with renovated platforms, 4 lifts, a new concourse/footbridge replacing the old one, a 6-storey parking garage, and a facelift of the surrounding area.

=== Bus ===
Rooty Hill is served by buses which allow its residents to travel east towards Blacktown and throughout Mount Druitt and its satellite suburbs.

=== Road ===
Rooty Hill Road North and Rooty Hill Road South act as important roads which run along Rooty Hill's longitude, with Rooty Hill Road North connecting Rooty Hill with Plumpton, Oakhurst, and Hassall Grove. Rooty Hill Road South, meanwhile, connects Rooty Hill with Minchinbury, and provides access to the Great Western Highway and the M4 Motorway. Woodstock Avenue connects Rooty Hill with Mount Druitt and Whalan, and also provides access to the Westlink M7 (M7 motorway). Francis Road runs over the railway tracks, connecting the North with the South and connects Rooty Hill with Doonside, once the road turns into Eastern Road after an intersection with Rooty Hill Road South. North Parade and Beames Avenue run along Rooty Hill's latitude, with North Parade connecting the suburb with Mount Druitt's commercial centre.

== Places of worship ==
=== Christianity ===
- St. Albans Anglican Multicultural Bible Ministry (MBM) is located in Westminster Street, Rooty Hill. St Alban's MBM exists in order to lead all people in the multicultural west of Sydney to Christ and into maturity in Christ. Mal Gill is the Lead Pastor
- Rooty Hill Uniting Church is located on Rooty Hill Road North. Sunday service is at 9am.
- St. Aidan's Parish is a Catholic church and is located on Adelaide Street, Rooty Hill.
- Pioneer Memorial Church is located on the corner of Rooty Hill Road South and Church Street, Rooty Hill.
- Minchinbury Anglican Church (MAC) is on Rupertswood Road, Rooty Hill.
- St Stephen is a Serbian Orthodox Church located on Woodstock Avenue, Rooty Hill.
- Cornerstone Baptist Church is a King James Bible Believing Baptist Church, located on Rooty Hill Road South.

=== Islam ===
Rooty Hill Masjid serves as the main mosque for the area. Despite being named after Rooty Hill, the Rooty Hill Masjid is actually in Mount Druitt, though is on the border between Rooty Hill and Mount Druitt.

=== Hinduism ===
No proper temples exist, however the Hindu Priest/Pundit Prakash Maharaj offers pooja and ritual services.

== Parks ==
- Angus Park
- Aquilina Reserve
- Blacktown International Sportspark
- Central Park
- Harry Dennison Park
- Kimberley Park
- May Cowpe Reserve
- Morreau Reserve
- Nurragingy Reserve
- Rooty Hill Skatepark
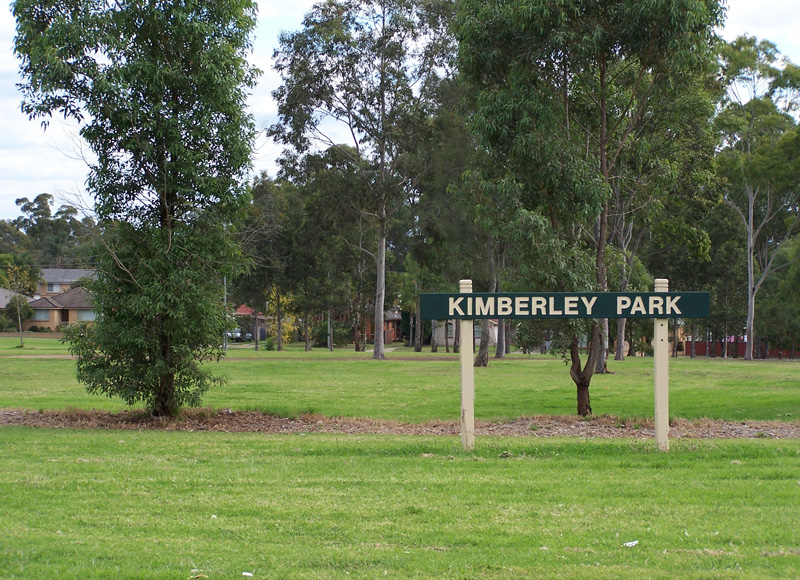
Kimberley Park

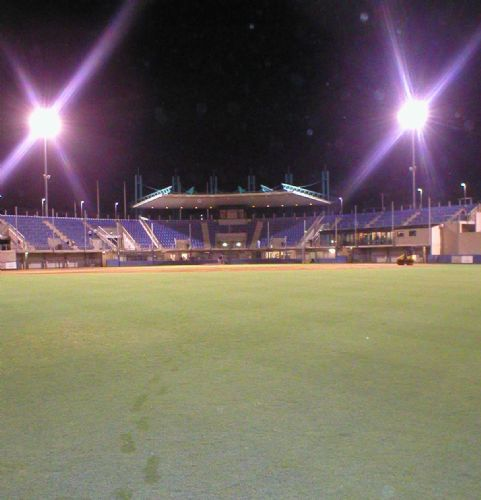
Blacktown Baseball Stadium @ Blacktown International Sportspark @ sydney blue Sox

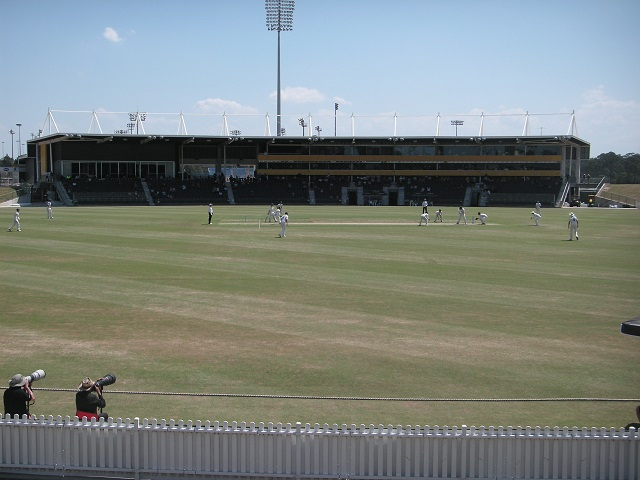
Cricket at Blacktown International Sportspark Oval

== Notable residents ==
- Kylie Gauci, Paralympic basketballer
- Mile Jedinak, footballer for the Socceroos, was born and raised in Rooty Hill
- Douglas Mawson, geologist and explorer, known for his role in Antarctic expeditions
- Grentperez, Filipino descent pop artist
- Harley Windsor, pair figure skater, born in Penrith and was the first Australian Indigenous athlete to compete in the Winter Olympics.
- Annie Forsyth Wyatt, community worker, conservationist and Red Cross worker
