= Oxley Park =

- Suburb
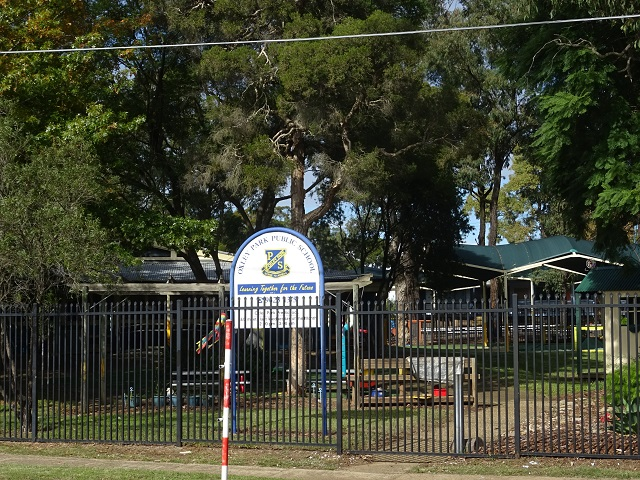
- Oxley Park Public School

- Interactive map of Oxley Park
- Country: Australia
- State: New South Wales
- City: Sydney
- LGA: Penrith City Council
- Location: 43 km (27 mi) west of Sydney CBD
- Established: 1823

Government
  - State electorate: Londonderry
  - Federal division: Lindsay
- Elevation: 44 m (144 ft)

Population
  - Total: 4,197 (2021 census)
- Postcode: 2760
Suburbs around Oxley Park
North St Marys	North St Marys	Whalan
St Marys	Oxley Park	Mount Druitt
St Marys	Colyton	Minchinbury

Oxley Park is a suburb of Sydney in the state of New South Wales, Australia. It is 43 kilometres (27 mi) west of the Sydney central business district, in the local government area of the City of Penrith and is part of the Greater Western Sydney region.

== History ==
Oxley Park was named after explorer John Oxley (1784–1828) was granted 600 acres (2.4 km^{2}) in this area in 1808, being officially announced or 'gazetted' in 1823. The grant extended from Queen street St Marys east to Ropes Creek and from the Great Western Highway to the railway line.

Oxley Park Public School was established in 1957 and is still in operation.

== Land use ==
Oxley Park is a residential suburb. It is one of the older suburbs around St Marys, with older homes on large blocks of land. Its boundaries are Ropes Creek in the east, the Great Western Highway to the south, Sydney Street as its western border, and the Main Western railway line as the northern edge separating it from North St Marys.

Aside from housing, Oxley Park features sporting fields such as the Cec Blinkhorn/Ridge Park sporting oval and other facilities such as Oxley Park Primary School, St Marys Uniting Church (which holds services catering to Cook Islander, Samoan, and regular English-speaking churchgoers), and St Marys Cemetery (the second-largest cemetery in the City of Penrith behind the one in Kingswood).

As a small residential suburb with no central business district or industrial areas, the closest being the one along Queen street in St Marys and the Dunheved/North St Marys region north of the train line, a dedicated strip of Sydney street is zoned for convenience stores and small businesses such as a bakery, specialty clothing store, medical practice, salon, pharmacy and woodfire pizza parlour.

A smaller park in the suburb, Brian King park, along Braddon street, features a playground that was designed with input contributed by students in grades 5 and 6 of the local Oxley Park Primary School during the 2019 Penrith Mayoral Challenge. Brian King was a mayor of Penrith who served for 10-12 years cumulatively, eventually receiving the Order of Australia honour for his service, and he lived in Oxley park for most of his life until his passing in 2001.

== Gallery ==
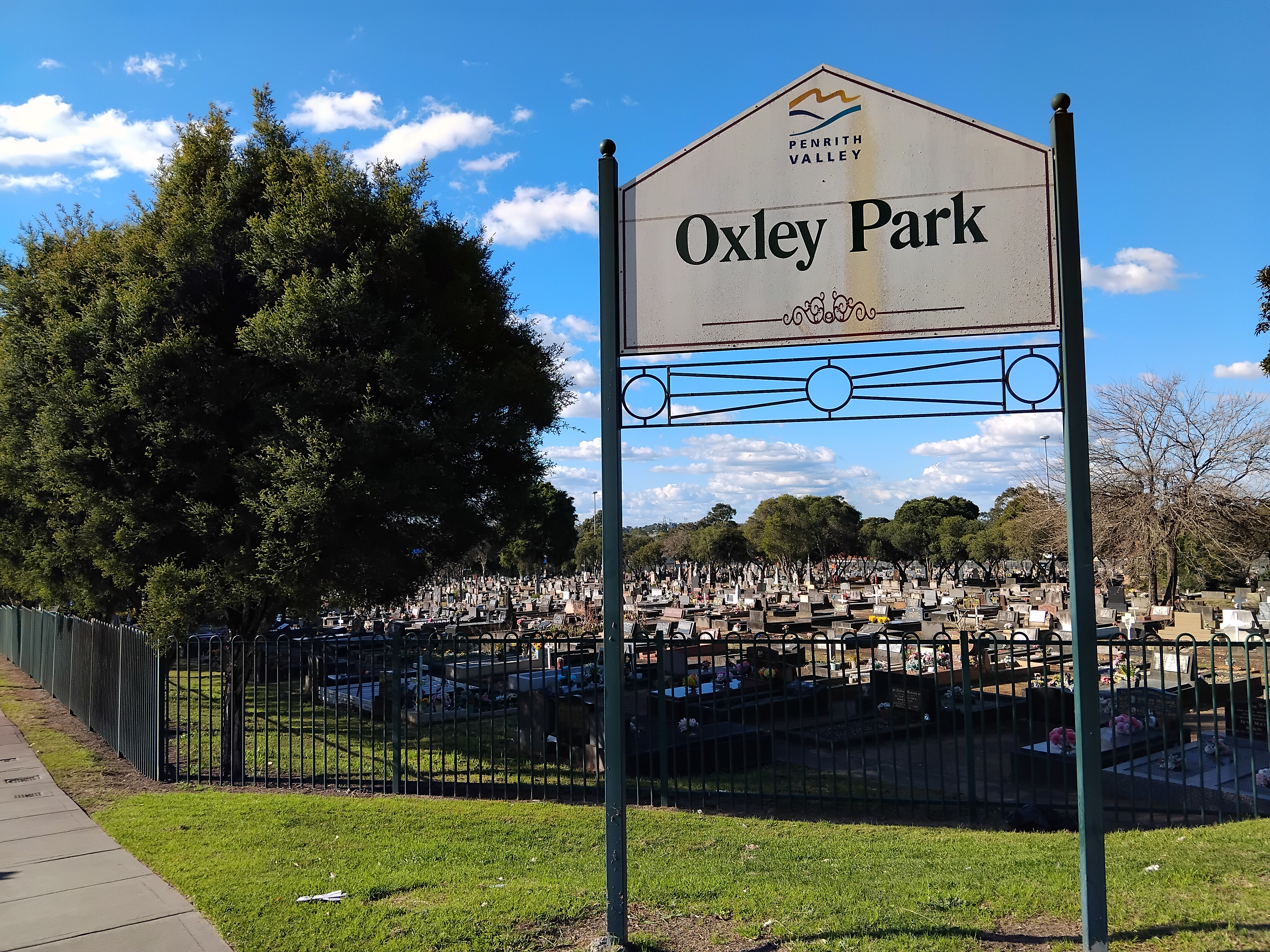
St Marys Cemetery, viewed from the northeastern corner of Sydney Street and Great Western highway. This cemetery is the 2nd largest in the region. The deceased of multiple denominations are interred here.

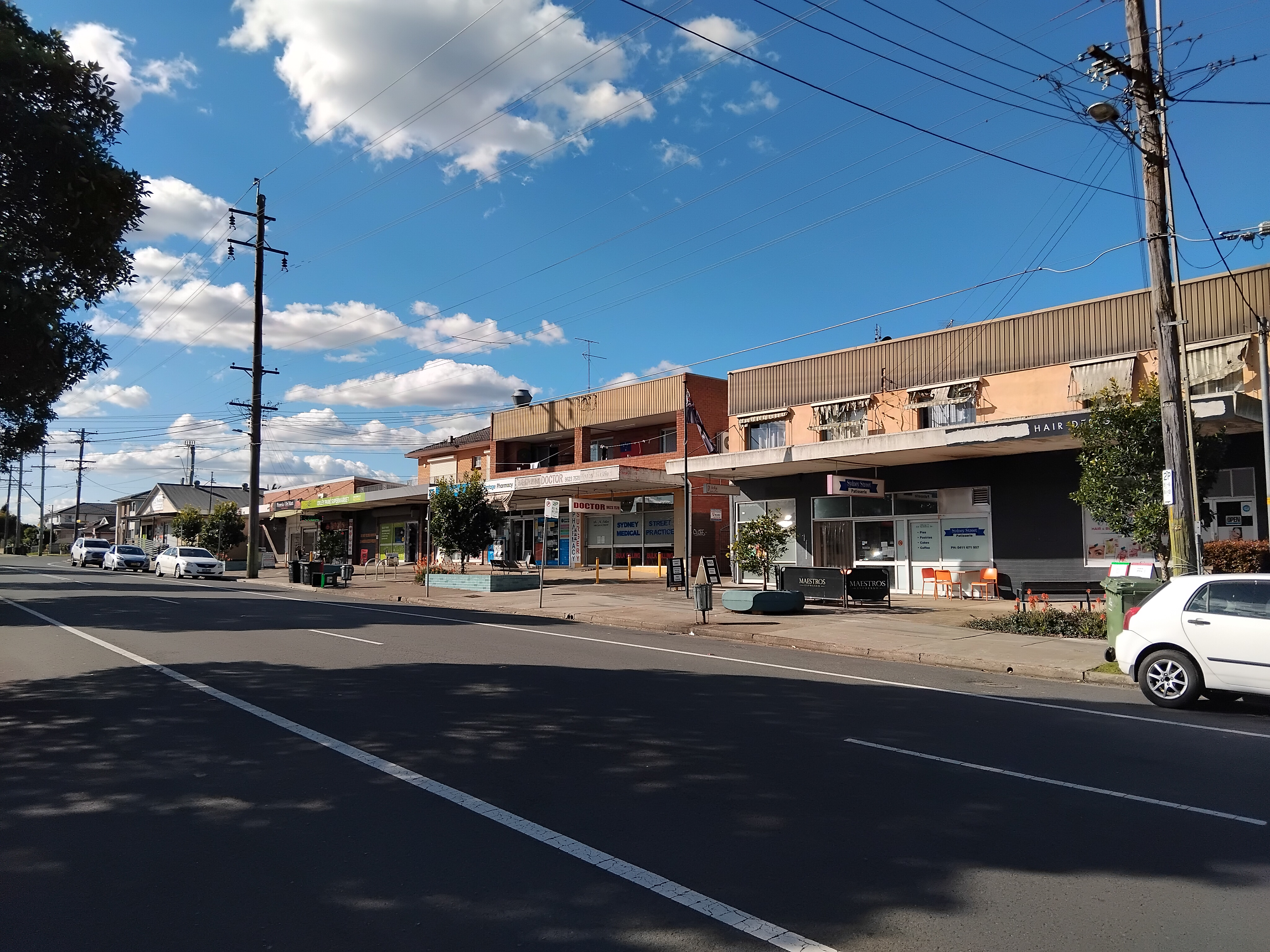
This small strip of stores on Sydney Street is the main commercial and services hub within Oxley Park.

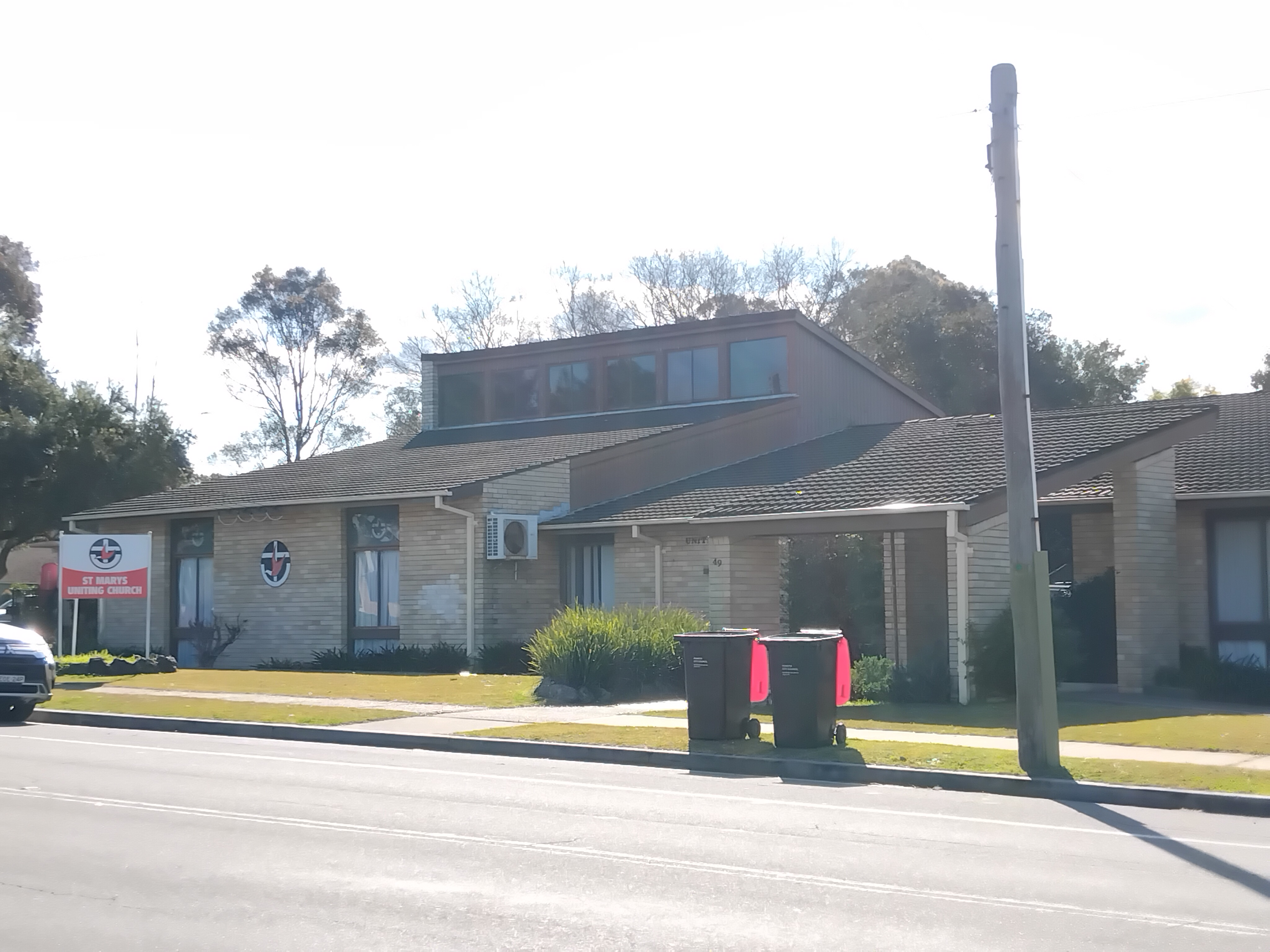
The St Marys Uniting church in Oxley Park hosts services in multiple languages, activity groups, and significant life occasions such as baptisms, weddings, and funerals. It also hires out the space to community groups.

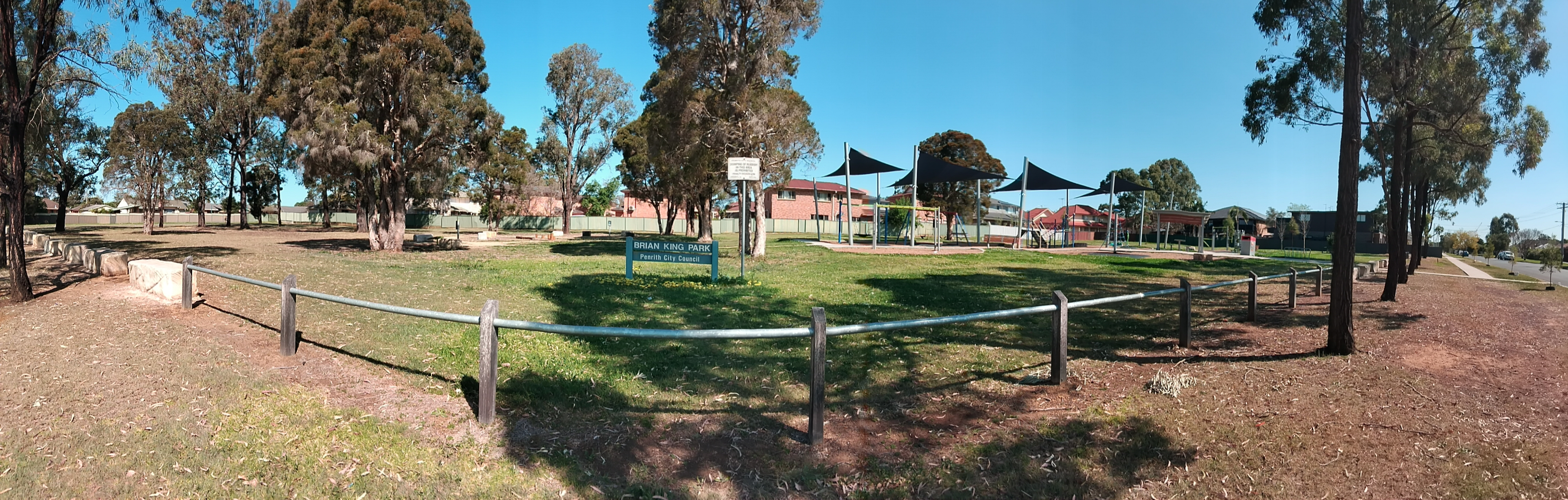
Brian King Park, situated along Braddon street, was co-designed by 5th and 6th graders from the nearby Oxley Park Public School. The park has a playground for children and an outdoor gym circuit for adult-sized visitors.

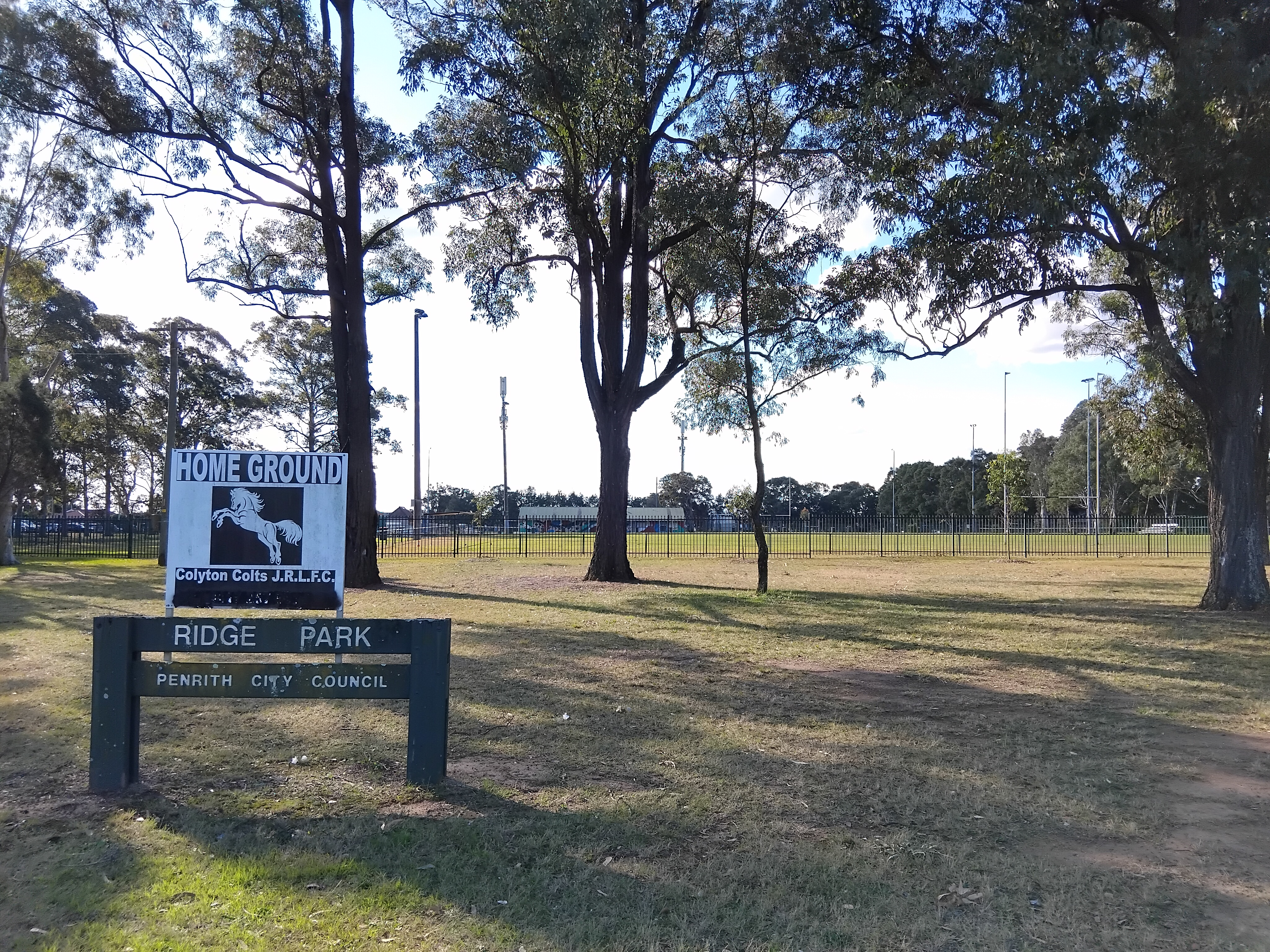
With one enclosed oval and one open oval, Ridge Park is the main site of club sports matches in Oxley Park.

== Trivia ==
The main streets that cut through Oxley Park and the segment of St Marys between Glossop street and Sydney street follow the theme of being named after capital cities of Australian states.

In actuality, their namesakes are battleships of the Australian Navy. Sydney street was named after HMAS Sydney, Adelaide street after HMAS Adelaide, Canberra street after HMAS Canberra, Brisbane street after HMAS Brisbane, Hobart street after HMAS Hobart, Melbourne street after HMAS Melbourne, and Perth street after HMAS Perth. There is no Darwin street.
