= William Minchin =

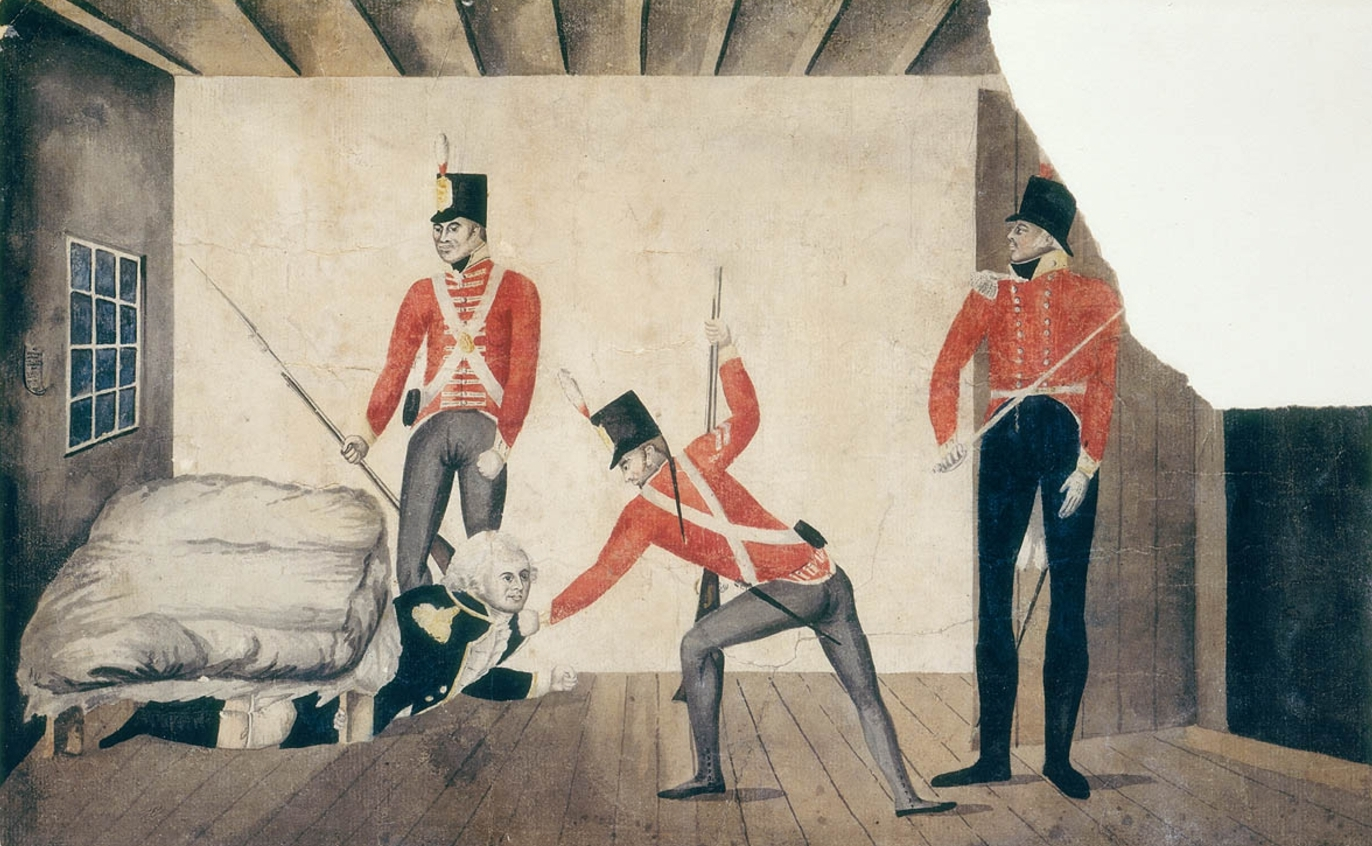
- Propaganda cartoon of William Bligh's arrest in Sydney in 1808, portraying him as a coward. Minchin is at the right. State Library of New South Wales, Sydney.
- Born: 1774; Tipperary, Ireland
- Died: 26 March 1821; New South Wales, Australia
- Occupation: army officer

William Minchin (1774–26 March 1821) was an Irish-born British army officer. He was commissioned an ensign in the New South Wales Corps on 2 March 1797.

He returned to England with the New South Wales Corps, now the 102nd Regiment of Foot, in 1810. He served with the regiment on Guernsey, Bermuda, during the American War of 1812, Halifax and New Brunswick.

In August 1817 Minchin sold his commission and retired to New South Wales. He died there on 26 March 1821.

The Sydney suburb of Minchinbury is named after Minchin, who was granted property in the area in 1819.
