= Minchinbury, New South Wales =

Minchinbury
- Suburb
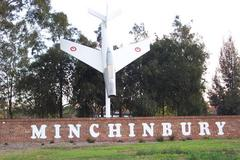
- The Jet at Minchinbury

- Interactive map of Minchinbury
- Country: Australia
- State: New South Wales
- City: Sydney
- LGA: City of Blacktown
- Location: 38 km (24 mi) west of Sydney

Government
  - State electorate: Mount Druitt
  - Federal division: McMahon
- Elevation: 57 m (187 ft)

Population
  - Total: 5,778 (2021 census)
- Postcode: 2770
Suburbs around Minchinbury
Oxley Park	Mount Druitt	Rooty Hill
Colyton	Minchinbury	Eastern Creek
Erskine Park	Eastern Creek	Eastern Creek

Minchinbury is a small suburb in western Sydney, in the state of New South Wales, Australia. Minchinbury is located 38 kilometres (24 mi) west of the Sydney central business district, in Blacktown local government area and is part of the Greater Western Sydney region.

Minchinbury is predominantly a residential area with a small commercial/retail area in the centre and industrial/commercial zones in the westernmost part.

== History ==
Minchinbury takes its name from the property named by Captain William Minchin who was granted 1,000 acres (4.0 km^{2}) land in 1819 on his retirement by Governor Lachlan Macquarie. William Minchin was the Principal Superintendent of Police and Treasurer of the Police Fund in the colony. The Minchinbury property was largely undeveloped and primarily used to graze cattle by the Minchin family and various lessees. After the death of William in 1821, the property passed to his only daughter Maria Matilda. In 1838, Maria Matilda and her family were lost at sea, leaving no descendants of William Minchin alive today. Minchin's brother, George, who resided in Canada, inherited the property.

In 1859, George Minchin, appointed John Nodes Dickinson, an NSW Supreme Court official as trustee. In February the Minchin estate, totalling 1220 acres was sold to Dr Charles McKay, a practitioner from Kilrea in Ireland, for £2,100. McKay was already a landowner of 20,110 acres during the 1860s and one of the largest landowners in the area and it was under his ownership that the grape vines were first planted on the Minchinbury Estate.

During the 1860s, the McKay family established a vineyard on the site as well as cultivating silkworms. By 1879 the wines from Minchinbury received three awards at the Sydney Garden Palace Exhibition.

In 1881, Dr McKay listed his extensive properties in the Minchinbury area for sale, due to financial difficulties. The advertisement by Charles Moore & Co Auctioneers described the property as follows;

“...600 acres in various sizes could be sold in sections if desirable. Minchinbury embraces 60 acres of enclosed land, and planted with about 50,000 vines in full bearing...A trap dike of blue metal runs through the Minchinbury from west to east which will be invaluable to parties contracting for blue metal for Sydney Streets. There is also a hill of trap tuff, the deposit from an extinct volcano.

This is hard and durable stone used for some years on a portion of the Great Western Road. A tramway could be inexpensively made from the quarries to Rooty Hill Station. Fine clay for brick making and good building sandstone can also be obtained. There are three wine cellars, two sixty feet by twenty, on sixty by thirty, capable of storing one hundred thousand gallons of wine and wells, tanks and lagoons with never failing water supply".

Despite this publicity, the land did not sell until 1895 when Dr McKay was able to sell all of it to James Angus.

The vineyards continued to be cultivated and produced high-quality wines. The new owner, James Angus, continued to expand the wine production, and he also established a quarry, a piggery, dairy and olive trees on the land.

James Angus began to expand the winery and continued to until the sale of the property in 1913. Angus sold the vineyards and cellar complex to Penfolds Wines but retained a major portion of the estate for his family, He was killed when he was hit by a train at Rooty Hill station in 1916.

Minchinbury was the second vineyard bought by Penfolds in New South Wales, the first being Dalwood, near Branxton in the Hunter Valley. With properties in New South Wales and South Australia they were claimed to be the largest wine producer in the British Empire.

Minchinbury was Penfolds' first venture into sparkling wines and it became famous for its champagne. Penfolds stopped operations at the winery in 1978.

Many street names in Minchinbury derive from wine types, wineries, or wine regions such as Sherry, Pinot, and Barossa.

== Landmarks ==
Along the southern side of the Great Western Highway there are several notable landmarks:

- The previous entrance to Penfolds Winery remains in the form of the masonry work on either side of the gate, at the top of the hill between Willis Street and Beaconsfield Road.
- A facsimile of the original CAC Avon Sabre jet aircraft (that had been installed at the entrance to the winery in 1955 with the accompanying sign "Don't Crash, Drink Penfolds") is mounted about 10 m off the ground, in a nearly vertical manner, at the intersection of the Great Western Highway and Minchin Drive (adjacent to Minchinbury Reserve). The original plane was placed there by Penfolds in the 1930s when they acquired it from Cliff Carpenter, who built it but only flew it once. It was originally crashed nose into the ground with the sign painted on the underside of the wings.
- Minchinbury Wine Cellars (currently known as The Distillery Woodfire Restaurant) is the site of former Minchinbury Winery heritage estate dating back to 1860.
- Minchinbury Reserve, a large park and garden that used primarily as sports facilities for local residents and non-local residents, and also a home ground of the Minchinbury Jets.

== Commercial and Industrial Areas ==
Although Minchinbury is mainly a residential area, It also has several commercial area complexes.

Minchinbury is a home to Aldi Australia Head Office, Woolworths Sydney regional distribution centre, StarTrack depot, Salvation Army Head Office, National Storage, numerous automotive workshops, logistics company, manufacturer, and construction-related stores. Minchinbury is regarded as an institutional investment-grade location, well supported by major corporates including Aldi, Woolworths and StarTrack.

There are currently several commercial/retail centres in Minchinbury including:

- Minchinbury Shopping Centre, located on the corner of Macfarlane Drive and Minchin Drive features IGA Supermarket and specialty shops
- Minchinbury fruit market, located on Great Western Highway, also famous for its fresh fruit and vegetables is one of the largest fruit and vegetable retailing premises in Sydney.
- Minchinbury Community Hospital, located on the corner of Great Western Highway and Rupertswood Rd.
- Car City, located in Carlisle Ave, one of the largest Used Car Complex in the Southern Hemisphere.

Minchinbury also has Minchinbury Neighbourhood Centre, a community hall that can be used for numerous occasions.

== Religion ==
In 2021, the largest religious group in Minchinbury is Western (Roman) Catholic 34.4%, No Religion 16.1%, Islam 12.8%, Anglican 8.3% and Not stated 4.5%. There are several churches in Minchinbury and one Mosque including:

- Iglesia Ni Cristo, located in Eskdale Street.
- MCYAS (Muslim Cultural & Youth Association Sydney), located in Eddie Road.

Minchinbury also the home of Pinegrove Memorial Park and Lung Po Shan Chinese Memorial Gardens, a large burial and cremation memorial spaces in Sydney's Greater West.

== Demographics ==
According to the 2021 census, Minchinbury had a population of 5,778. The largest ancestries in Minchinbury were Australian 22.0%, English 17.7%, Filipino 11.5%, Indian 4.8% and Maltese 4.6%. 58.7% of people were born in Australia. Other countries of birth included Philippines 7.7%, Fiji 2.9%, New Zealand 2.5%, India 2.2% and Pakistan 1.9%. 55.8% of people only spoke English at home. Other languages spoken included Arabic 6.7%, Tagalog 5.3%, Hindi 2.8%, Urdu 2.5% and Turkish 2.1%.

== Transport ==
The Great Western Highway runs along the northern border, while the M4 Motorway runs along the southern border. The Westlink M7 motorway runs along the eastern border. There is a regular bus service (Busways 729) to and from Mount Druitt and Blacktown.

== Schools and Colleges ==
Minchinbury Public School serves Kindergarten students through to Year 6. In the M Centre, Minchibury there are two Registered Training Organisations, National Training Masters with the Western Sydney Campus and Arrow Heavy Vehicle Driving School.

== Sporting clubs ==
Minchinbury features clubs for Pioneers Netball Club, Soccer, Cricket, Athletics and Rugby league (Minchinbury Jets JRLC).

== Geology ==
Minchinbury is the type location of the Minchinbury Sandstone.
