= Government Depot Site, Rooty Hill =

Government Depot Site
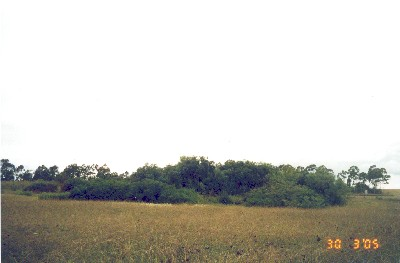
- View of the site from Dunsmore Street, looking southwards towards Rooty Hill, with the vegetated area marking the house site

- Location within New South Wales Location within Australia
- 33.7743°S 150.8509°E
- Location: Dunsmore Street, Rooty Hill, City of Blacktown, New South Wales, Australia

History
- Built: 1815–1819

Site notes
- Owner: Department of Planning and Infrastructure

New South Wales Heritage Register
- Official name: Government Depot Site (former); Government Depot Ruins; Thornleigh; Stratton; Rooty Hill Government Farm
- Type: state heritage (complex / group)
- Designated: 2 April 1999
- Reference no.: 345
- Type: Homestead Complex
- Category: Farming and Grazing
- Builders: Not known

Government Depot Site is a heritage-listed archaeological site at the location of the former Government Stock Farm on Dunsmore Street, Rooty Hill, New South Wales, a suburb of Sydney, Australia. It was built from 1815 to 1819 It is also known as Government Depot Site (former), Government Depot Ruins, Thornleigh, Stratton and Rooty Hill Government Farm. The property is owned by Department of Planning and Infrastructure (State Government). It was added to the New South Wales State Heritage Register on 2 April 1999.

== History ==
There is much speculation about the source of the name Rooty Hill. Mr William Freame wandered much in these parts collecting information from old residents. In 1931 in an article in a country newspaper on place names he wrote regarding the name: "Old hands assure me that the hill received its name from the roots and other debris left around its bare fields when the Eastern Creek was in flood, and this appears to be a very reasonable deduction." Mrs Hawkins description quoted later in the derivation does not appear reasonable. Captain J H Watson's version, he as a young man having been in India, and he derives the name from "ruti", the Hindustani word for bread. Governor Macquarie as a young man had been in India, and if the settlement at the hill had been devoted to agriculture there would have been a connection, but it was a stockyard. A third and anonymous writer puts forward a Captain Thomas Rooty as a resident in the locality. No information can be found on him.

The district was used as a Government stockyard, and in a lengthy list which Governor Macquarie prepared of the buildings and works erected during his regime between January 1810 and November 1821, we find the following:

"At Rooty Hill:
1. a brick built house of two stories high for the residence and accommodation of the superintendent and principal overseer of the Government stock at the station, reserving one room for the use of the Governor, when occasionally there, with kitchen, stables and other necessary out-offices and kitchen garden enclosed;
2. four paddocks of 50 acres, each enclosed for the grazing of young cattle and raising of wheat and maize for the use of the stockmen;
3. temporary log huts or barracks for the accommodation of 20 stockkeepers, with small kitchen garden attached thereto.
NB: The station at Rooty Hill is the next principal one to Camden for the grazing of the Government horned cattle and horses, and consists of about 6000 acres of land of a very superior description, and, as this grazing ground is centrically situated, being on the Great Western Road and only 10 miles distant from Parramatta, it ought not to be on any account alienated from the Crown.

Macquarie seems to have forgotten that he had already carved a large slice off the reservation by giving Major Druitt in October 1821 a grant of 1000 acres 'out of the Rooty Hill Government allotment on Ross's Creek'. Mount Druitt is a permanent reminder of this grant. In 1824 Captain P. P. King, son of Governor King, was given a grant of 1500 acres, also part of the Rooty Hill establishment.

On January 11, 1822 T. H. Hawkins arrived in Sydney with wife and 8 children and mother in law. A few months later he received an appointment as commissariat storekeeper at Bathurst, and on April 5 set out from Sydney, at the head of a cavalcade of bullock wagons, carts, drays and belongings over the Blue Mountains to their new home. Late that night the party reached Rooty Hill, a distance of 25 miles from Sydney, the Government House was ready to receive them. ...Hawkins described the place "I could have been contented to remain there for ever - the house was good, and the land around like a fine wooded park in England".

The "brick built house of two stories" still stands (1935), with galvanised iron roof (seen in a photo) where once it was shingle-rooved. The oak tree (also shown in a photo) would have been small in Macquarie's time, but is now a veteran, ... a sturdy sample of the genus' (sic).

Very little is known about the history of the site other than that it was a Stock Farm, whose original boundary was the present City of Blacktown perimeter. The original building on the site was the Superintendent's residence and was also used by Governor Macquarie and other passing travellers. The site was later known as "Thornleigh" and then "Stratton" although the origin of these names is not known.

Two rooms were added for Governor Macquarie's convenience. It was in a ruinous state in the 1960s, and was demolished.

1935 photographs showed the two story "old homestead on old Government Stock Farm, Rooty Hill", with two chimneys at each end gable, a half-hipped/hipped gable roof form, what appears to be a gum tree to one side, close to the house, and a low picket fence in front. Another photograph showed a fairly large oak tree (Quercus sp., probably common English oak, Q.robur) at the same location, with a picket fenced paddock around it.

== Description ==
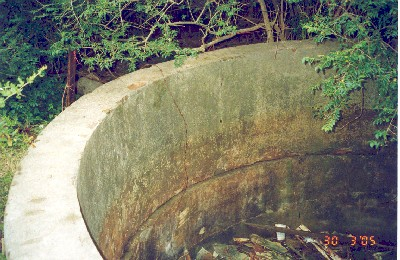
Underground tank, possibly the well

The site once comprised the former c.6000 acre Government Stock Farm and associated Superintendent's residence built in 1815.

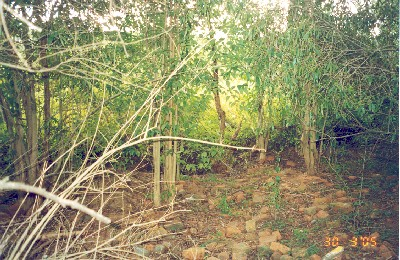
Broken bricks within the vegetation growing over the house site

Between January 1810 and November 1821, there was (in terms of buildings on site):

"At Rooty Hill:
1. a brick built house of two stories high for the residence and accommodation of the superintendent and principal overseer of the Government stock at the station, reserving one room for the use of the Governor, when occasionally there, with kitchen, stables and other necessary out-offices and kitchen garden enclosed;
2. four paddocks of 50 acres, each enclosed for the grazing of young cattle and raising of wheat and maize for the use of the stockmen;
3. temporary log huts or barracks for the accommodation of 20 stockkeepers, with small kitchen garden attached thereto.

From a walk around the overgrown area where the original building is thought to have been, there is little visible evidence remaining of any structures above ground. The area is almost completely overgrown with thorn bushes. The only evidence found included several timber posts, from a post and rail fence and a large cement rendered brick pit (possibly a well). It has been filled with various items and debris. Remnants of the garden which would have served the main building are discernable, as is the overall form of the garden.

A 1992 DUAP listing described the remains of the depot to include: mounds of bricks, stone flagging, timber slabs, and a five-metre-diameter (16 ft) well, however, with the exception of the well, none of these structures are visible and appear unlikely to have survived.

=== Condition ===
The residence was a ruin as at 23 November 2000, although its exact condition could not be ascertained owing to the overgrown condition of the site. The site has high potential archaeological value associated with its former use as a Government Stock Farm.

It is considered that there is very little, if any built fabric remaining and the overseer's house site cannot therefore be considered to be intact. However it does retain the overall form and elements of the house's garden, and open space, remnant of the former Government Stock Farm.

Very little is known about the site and a detailed physical survey does not appear to have been carried out to date. Owing to the site's former use and its association with Governor Macquarie, further investigation is warranted. Due to the uncertainty whether there is anything left of the building at all, there is some urgency attached to this. What remains of the site should be carefully documented. If there is very little remaining, there may be potential for the site's removal from the register.

== Heritage listing ==
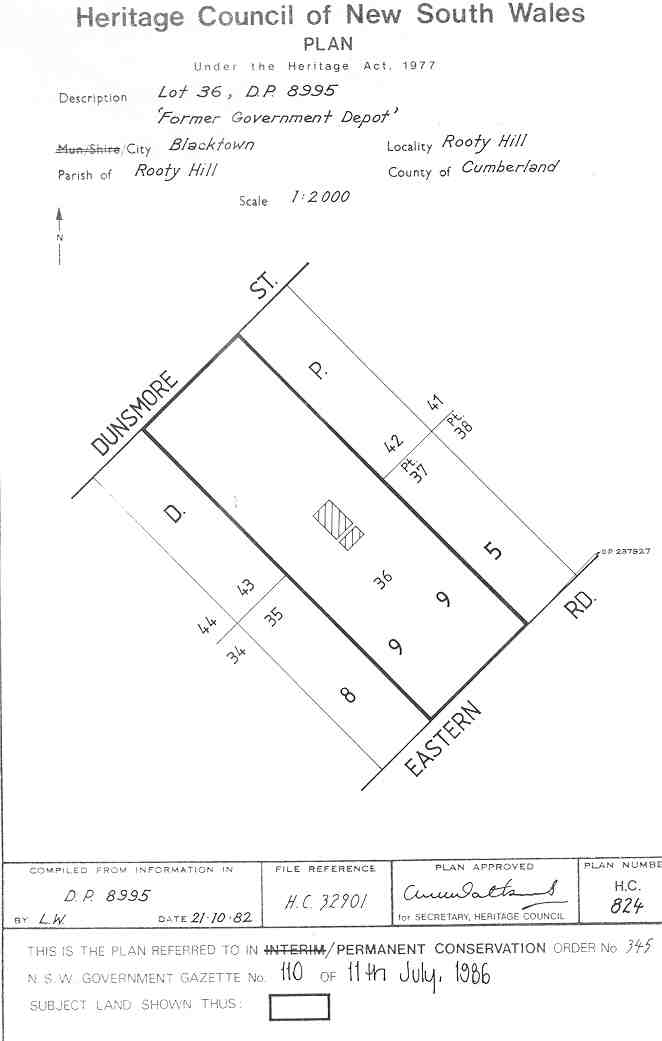
Heritage boundaries

The Government Depot site has potential State significance for its association with Governor Macquarie and is certainly of regional significance as the former residence of the Superintendent of the stock farm. The site also has local significance through its association with early travellers and settlers in the district.

The station at Rooty Hill was the next principal one to that at Camden for the grazing of the Government horned cattle and horses in the early 1800s.

Government Depot Site was listed on the New South Wales State Heritage Register on 2 April 1999 having satisfied the following criteria.

The place is important in demonstrating the course, or pattern, of cultural or natural history in New South Wales.

The (former) Government Depot site is of historical significance for its association with Governor Macquarie and other travellers and early settlers in the Blacktown/Rooty Hill district. It is also of significance for its former role as a Government Stock Farm. As part of the Government Stock Farm it was the second most important Government Station in the colony, after Camden.

The place is important in demonstrating aesthetic characteristics and/or a high degree of creative or technical achievement in New South Wales.

The (former) Government Depot retains the fabric of a portion of the Government Stock Farm's original 6000 acres of land, and as open space which could be read as still "rural", it has some aesthetic value, and some rarity in modern Western Sydney.

The superintendent's house site is considered to have little, if any, remaining built fabric. The site does retain the overall form and remnants of the overseer's garden. This latter site therefore has relatively little aesthetic significance, at present.

The place has strong or special association with a particular community or cultural group in New South Wales for social, cultural or spiritual reasons.

The (former) Government Depot is of social significance for its association with early settlers and travellers through the Blacktown/Rooty Hill district. It has further significance for the role it played in the raising of stock for the young colony and for its association with early industry in the district. It would have provided employment for many early settlers.

The place has potential to yield information that will contribute to an understanding of the cultural or natural history of New South Wales.

The (former) Government Depot may be of technical significance should the existence of any early structures be confirmed, and for its association with early farming and stock raising techniques - which may be demonstrated through any remains on the site which are yet to be discovered. These may provide insights into field sizes, shapes, fencing materials and types, animal and crop residues.

The place possesses uncommon, rare or endangered aspects of the cultural or natural history of New South Wales.

The (former) Government Depot retains the fabric of a portion of the Government Stock Farm's original 6000 acres of land, and as open space which could be read as still "rural", it has some aesthetic value, and some rarity in modern Western Sydney. As part of the Government Stock Farm it was the second most important Government Station in the colony, after Camden.

The place is important in demonstrating the principal characteristics of a class of cultural or natural places/environments in New South Wales.

The Government Stock Farm was one of the two most important such stations in the colony in the early 1820s, and still retains potential to demonstrate through its archaeological resources, a representative example of a colonial era farm, with typical farm elements of that era.
