= Rooty Hill railway station =

Railway station in Sydney, New South Wales, Australia

Rooty Hill
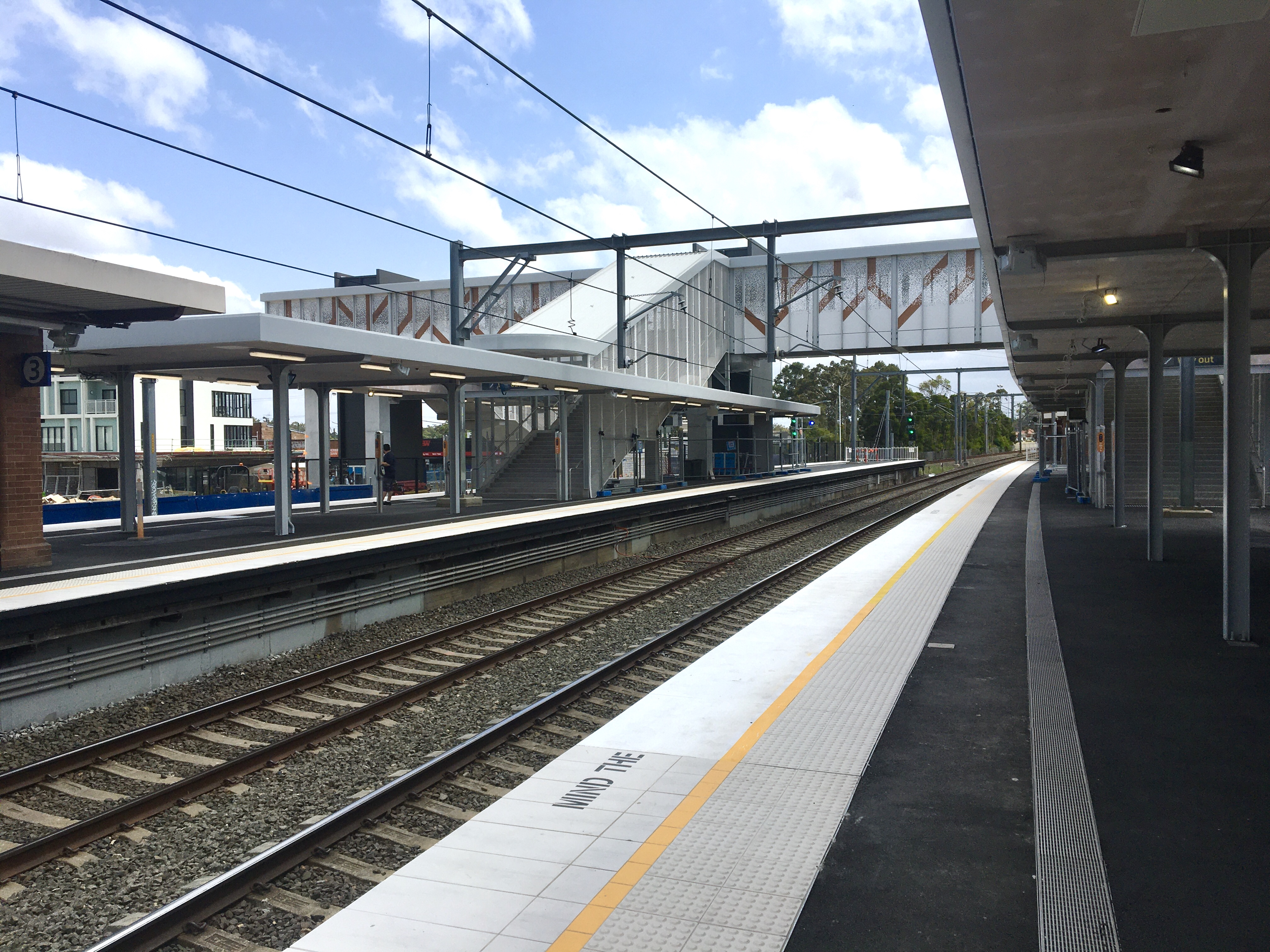
- Westbound view from Platform 2 in November 2019

General information
- Location: North Parade, Rooty Hill; Sydney, New South Wales; Australia
- Coordinates: 33°46′18″S 150°50′42″E
- Owner: Transport Asset Manager of NSW
- Operator: Sydney Trains
- Line: Main Western
- Distance: 40.91 km (25.42 mi) from Central
- Platforms: 4 (2 island)
- Tracks: 4
- Connections: Bus

Construction
- Structure type: Ground
- Platform levels: 1
- Parking: 375 spaces
- Accessible: Yes

Other information
- Status: Weekdays: Staffed: 6am to 7pm: Weekends and public holidays: Staffed: 8am to 4pm
- Station code: RYH
- Website: Transport for NSW

History
- Opened: 23 December 1861 (164 years ago)
- Rebuilt: 1940s (c.80 years ago)
- Electrified: Yes (from October 1955)

Passengers
- 2025: 1,860,161 (year); 5,096 (daily) (Sydney Trains)
- Rank: 82

Services
Preceding station	Sydney Trains	Following station
Mount Druitt towards Emu Plains	North Shore & Western Line	Doonside towards Berowra
Location

Rooty Hill railway station is a suburban railway station located on the Main Western line, serving the Sydney suburb of Rooty Hill. It is served by Sydney Trains T1 Western Line services.

== History ==
Rooty Hill station opened on 23 December 1861 as the terminus of the Main Western line when it was extended from Blacktown. On 1 May 1862, the line was extended to St Marys. The station was rebuilt in the 1940s.

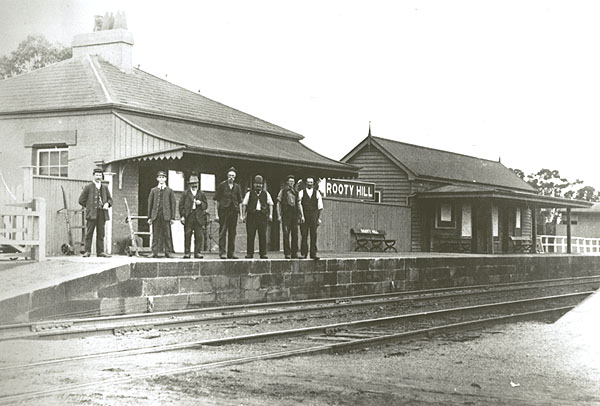
The original Rooty Hill station

The station was upgraded in January 2020 and received a new footbridge and lifts.

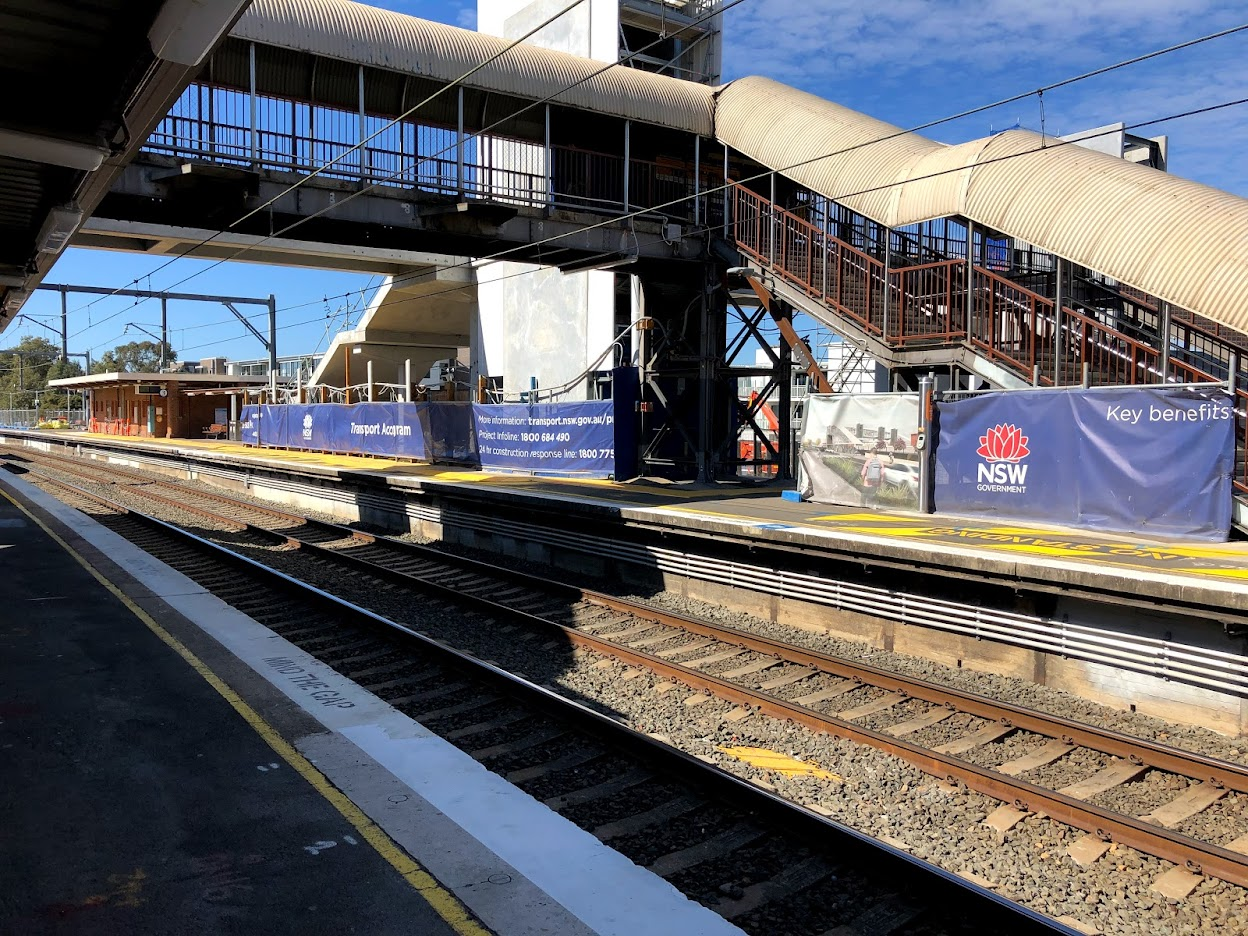
Upgrade works with the original footbridge in August 2019

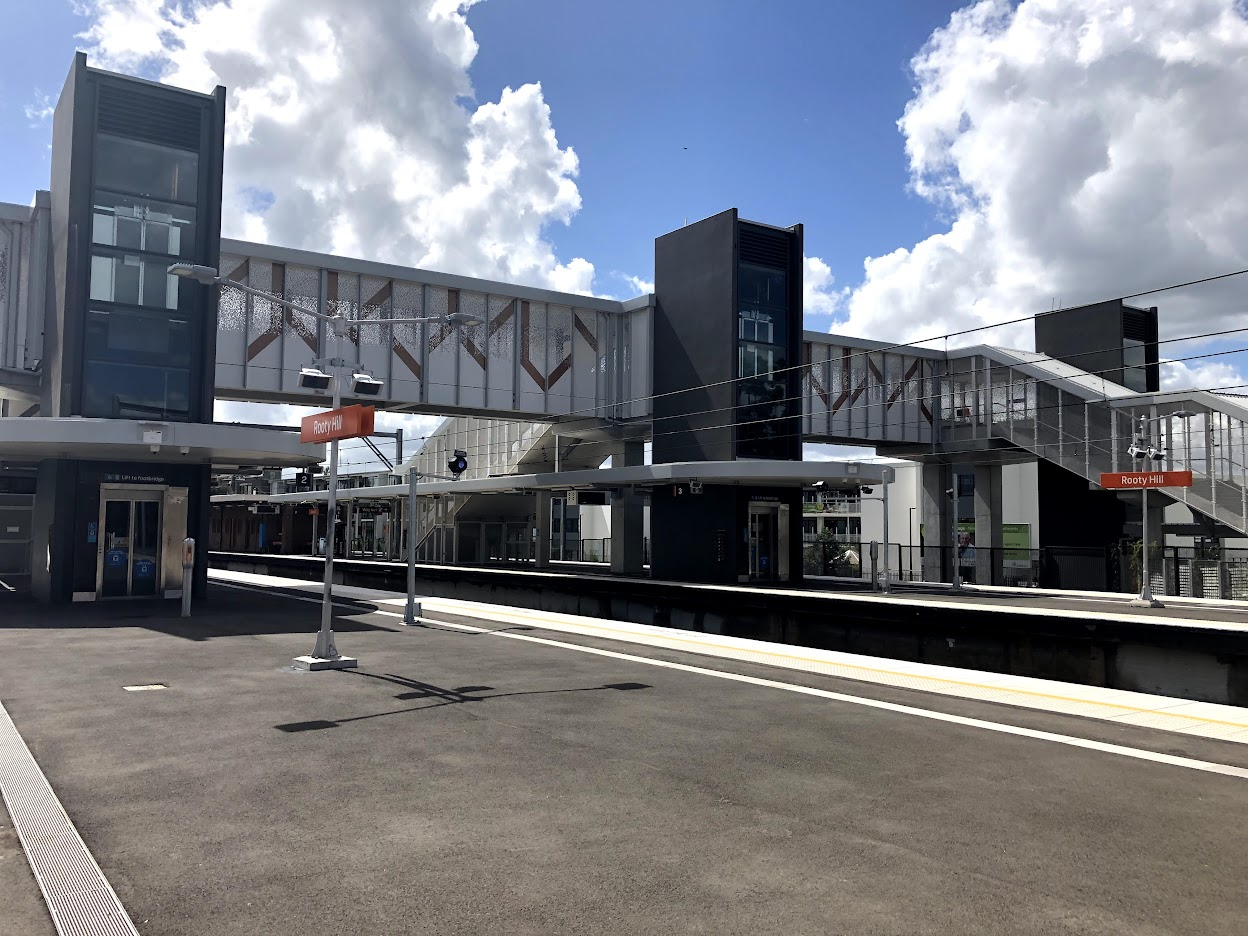
Completed upgrade works in February 2021

== Services ==
=== Platforms ===
Platform	Line	Stopping pattern	Notes
1	North Shore & Western Line	services to North Sydney, Gordon, Hornsby & Berowra via Central & Chatswood	
2	North Shore & Western Line	services to Gordon, Hornsby & Berowra via Central & Chatswood	Mainly used during peak hours
3	North Shore & Western Line	services to Penrith & Emu Plains	Mainly used during peak hours
4	North Shore & Western Line	services to Penrith & Emu Plains	

=== Transport links ===
Busways operates three bus routes via Rooty Hill station, under contract to Transport for NSW:

- 728: Mount Druitt station to Blacktown
- 738: to Eastern Creek
- 756: Mount Druitt station to Blacktown station via Plumpton & Woodcroft
