= Former Great Western Road Alignment, Prospect =

Historic road in New South Wales, Australia

Former Great Western Road, Prospect
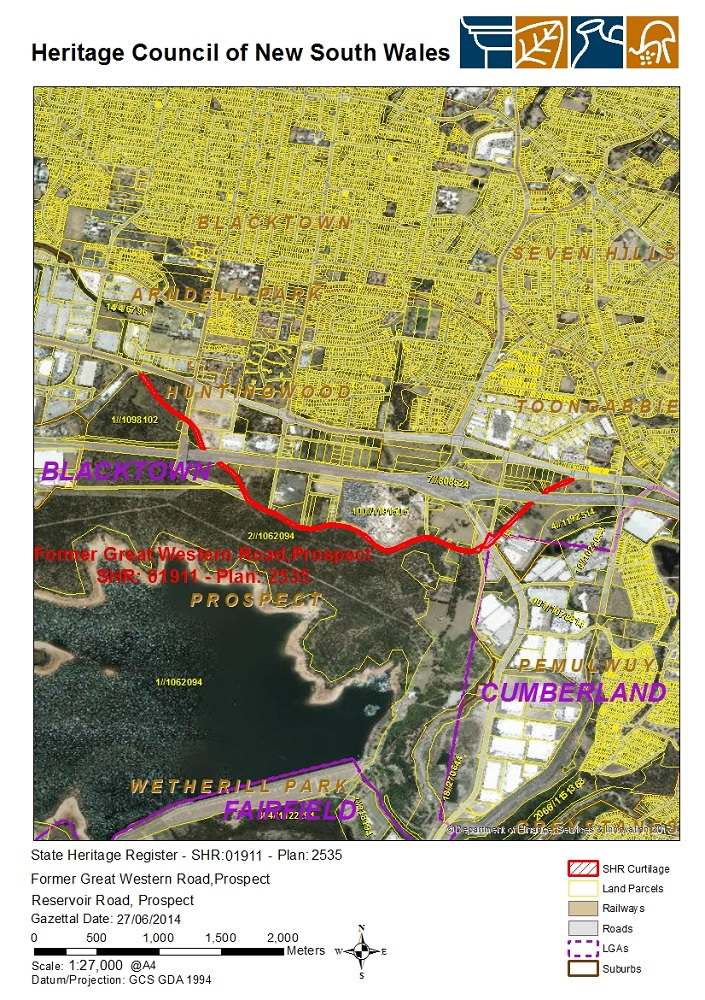
- 1911 – Former Great Western Road, Prospect – SHR Plan 2535 (5061510b100).jpg

- Location within New South Wales Location within Australia
- 33.8084°S 150.9066°E
- Location: Prospect, City of Blacktown, New South Wales, Australia

History
- Built: 1815–1818

Site notes
- Area: Heritage boundaries showing the route of the road
- Architect: George Evans was the likely surveyor. Governor Lachlan Macquarie ordered the road be constructed
- Owner: Blacktown City Council

New South Wales Heritage Register
- Official name: Former Great Western Road, Prospect; The Western Road; The Great Western Road; The Old Western Road; The Great Western Highway
- Type: state heritage (built)
- Designated: 27 June 2014
- Reference no.: 1911
- Type: Road
- Category: Transport – Land
- Builders: William Cox

Former Great Western Road Alignment, Prospect is a heritage-listed stretch of road, now divided into four separately-named sections of road and partially divided by the M4 Western Motorway at, Prospect, City of Blacktown, Sydney, New South Wales, Australia. The road was initiated by Governor Lachlan Macquarie, likely surveyed by George Evans and built from 1815 to 1818 by William Cox. It is also known as The Western Road, The Great Western Road, The Old Western Road and The Great Western Highway. The property is owned by Blacktown City Council. It was added to the New South Wales State Heritage Register on 27 June 2014.

== History ==
Prospect Hill, being the highest point between the Blue Mountains and the sea, was used as a vantage point and navigational element for the Aboriginal people who moved through the area, referring to the place as "Marrong". The Prospect Hill area has high cultural significance for the Aboriginal community. Oral tradition identifies the area as a meeting and trading place for groups who were drawn from the Rooty Hill, Parramatta, Penrith, Baulkham Hills, Brooklyn and Richmond areas.

It is believed that up to eight different Aboriginal groups inhabited the area around Prospect and that Indigenous groups remained for short stays only along the ridge, with more permanent camps being made along Prospect Creek. Research indicates that the Aboriginal population of the area was quite dense during the initial phases of European contact. Contact with the colonists was often acrimonious, leading to a number of skirmishes. Pemulwuy, an Eora man, led resistance and raids against the colonists (who had claimed large tracts of hunting lands and natural resources) from around 1790 to 1802 when he was killed by bounty hunters. After 1802, Pemulwuy's son Tedbury led Aboriginal resistance to the Europeans until his own death in 1805. Aboriginal trade networks are believed to have deteriorated following European occupation.

Governor Arthur Phillip explored the Prospect area in 1788 south-west of the end of the headwaters of the Parramatta River and named the wide low hill Bellevue Hill (the hill is an ancient volcanic upwelling referred to as a 'Doleritic Laccolith'). Bellevue means "Fine Prospect". The area later became known as Prospect Hill and then gradually as Prospect.

In 1791, Phillip granted land on the eastern slope of the hill to thirteen ex-convicts to take advantage of the more fertile soils on the flanks of the ancient volcanic hill, in contrast to the heavy clay soils elsewhere across the Cumberland Plain. The grantees took up the land, but they all struggled with their improvements on the small plots (up to 70 acres) and remained reliant on the Government stores.

Governor King set aside a large area of land north of the hill in 1802 as a reserve for the Government's livestock herd. Part of this Prospect Stock Reserve was declared a common in 1804 for the use of surrounding settlers. The area of the common was reduced by later grants.

By July 1815, following the completion of the Cox's Road over the Blue Mountains, work was underway on a road from Parramatta to the Nepean River (at Penrith) across the Cumberland Plain that included the section that is the Former Great Western Road, Prospect. The Western Road was one of the three Great Roads that were built with convict labour to open up the colony to European settlement beyond the Cumberland Plain. The other two are the Great North Road (1826–36) to Newcastle and the Hunter Region, and the Great South Road (1819-mid 1840s), parts of which are on the Hume Highway alignment.

The 1812 drought provided an impetus for expansion, as it highlighted the failings of the quality of land in the Cumberland Plain to support crop production for the growing colony. Prior to the crossing of the Blue Mountains in 1813, road transport out of Sydney and Parramatta had focused on expansion to the north and south. The successful crossing of the Blue Mountains dramatically refocused colonial attention to the fertile western plains beyond the mountains and highlighted the essential role that the Great Western Road played in European expansion beyond the Sydney basin.

William Cox was contracted to construct the road across the Cumberland Plain (including the subject section) as well as being contracted for the road over the Blue Mountains. Cox's specification for the Blue Mountains road (which may also be applied to the subject road at Prospect) determined a width of at least 12 ft (although 16 ft was preferred by Cox to permit two carts or other wheeled carriages to pass). The timber along the road was cut and cleared out for a 20 ft wide alignment, all holes were filled, and tree stumps grubbed out.

The surveyor of the road has not been definitively determined. George Evans, however, surveyed the road across the Blue Mountains and may have also aligned the road across the Cumberland Plain. The Prospect Heritage Study (T Kass) suggests that the alignment of the road at Prospect may have followed an earlier Aboriginal track for a route over the hill which avoids the creeks and the more flood prone and heavier ground to the north.

Governor Macquarie travelled the Great Western Road from Parramatta to Bathurst and inspected the work in October 1815. The road to Penrith appears to have been completed by 1818 when a Government notice specified tolls payable on the new Great Western Road. In 1814 Edward Cureton was contracted to provide 54 milestones for the road from Parramatta to Penrith. Until recently two milestones stood in, or close to, their original positions on the side of the Great Western Road at Prospect. But these have been relocated to the 1968 deviated section to the north.

The Great Western Road became the main transport route that opened up the vast hinterland beyond the Blue Mountains that bounded the Sydney basin. Helen Proudfoot captured the symbolic importance of the road in her Thematic History of Penrith (sourced from the Prospect Heritage Study):

"The great road west became a symbolic road as soon as it was formed. Its point of departure was George Street and Sydney Cove, the genesis of the colony; it travelled west to Parramatta, and then, near Prospect, its symbolic character begins to become apparent as the topography of long parallel ridges dipping down to the Nepean in prelude to the ascent of the river ramparts of the Blue Mountains beyond the river begins to unfold. The road held a strange sense of promise to its travellers, a sense of anticipation, quite unlike that felt on any other road out of Sydney".

The Great Western Road was gazetted as a main road in September 1833. Unlike local roads, the three Great Roads were kept under the control of the Colonial Government which maintained and repaired the infrastructure. By 1865, the Western Road from Parramatta to Penrith had been metalled.

From 1820, the establishment of the Great Western Road became a catalyst for the development of the country in the Prospect Hill area. The small (up to 70 acres) first grants established by Governor Phillip on the east slopes of Prospect Hill were consumed within larger grants (over 500 acres) made by Lieutenant Governors/Governors Grose, Paterson, Hunter and Macquarie to ex-marines and later to ex-New South Wales Corps members, free settlers and Government officials. Notably, William Lawson received a 500-acre grant south of the road and established Veteran Hall, which Lawson further expanded with the addition of land to the north and west. D'Arcy Wentworth, Captain Lethbridge and John Campbell also received over 2000 acres to the north of the road.

Part of the Prospect Common, left after the 1820s grants, was transferred to the Church and School Estate in 1829.

By the 1820s regular coach services were provided along the Great Western Road, with five toll bars placed between Parramatta and Penrith. One of the toll bars was located opposite the entrance to William Lawson's estate, to the south of the road.

From the outset, the owners of the larger grants set about subdividing the land and offering parcels for sale. By the later nineteenth century the Prospect area was a patchwork of remnants of the larger grants mixed with medium-sized land parcels. Subdivisions for small lots were not generally popular, exampled by the mostly unsuccessful Flushcombe Village sale in 1879 and the State Land Investment and Agency Co sale in 1929.

By the end of the nineteenth century the eastern section of the Great Western Road at Prospect was the focus of the Prospect Village which had grown slowly through the century to become a scattered collection of buildings flanking the road. Most of the nineteenth century houses have been demolished except for Bridestowe/Hick's Dairy (c. 1880s) on Reservoir Road at the eastern end of the Former Great Western Road, Prospect, south of the M4. Other notable buildings in the area include St Bartholomew's Anglican Church, constructed in 1841, which was recently repaired and still stands prominent on its hill viewable from along the eastern approaches and from the highest point of Reservoir Road. The Prospect Inn, at the east end of the village, (licensed in 1850) was demolished and a modern roadside hotel occupies its site. The Fox on the Hill Hotel on the site of the modern Fox Hill Golf Club was originally built in the 1820s. It burnt down and was rebuilt in the 1830s and then demolished in the 1970s. St Brigid's Catholic Church, constructed in 1856, was demolished in 1977 for the construction of the freeway. The Prospect Post Office, built in the 1880s, still stands (unused and boarded up) in Tarlington Place. The Cricketers Arms Hotel, built c. 1870, has been repaired and is a prominent feature on the corner of former Flushcombe Road and Reservoir Road. The Police Station, built 1883, west of Watch House Road still stands, albeit in poor condition and deteriorating.

The construction of Prospect Reservoir (from 1880 to 1888), to the south of the road, was a short, but notable catalyst for development of the area. However, the positive effects of development generated by the reservoir and its workforce was limited to its construction period and any economic activity in the Prospect area faded once the reservoir was completed and the workforce departed. The establishment of the western railway to the north with its local station at Blacktown also drew economic development away from the vicinity of the Great Western Road so that rural activities persisted in the area. The main legacy from the establishment of the Prospect Reservoir is that the land to the south of the Former Great Western Road, Prospect was resumed by the Government and never developed. The land is now a reserve of substantial indigenous regrowth as a secure catchment area surrounding the reservoir.

Prospect Hill provided a valuable source of grey dolerite within the ancient volcanic feature. Quarrying operated from the 1860s until recently and it provided constant low level economic stimulus to the area.

In 1925, the NSW Department of Main Roads was established and took over management of the Great Western Road. The new department reclassified many roads as main roads including the Western Road in 1926. The road was further reclassified in 1929 as a state highway and was retitled as the Great Western Highway. In the 1930s the Main Roads Department experimented with line marking, warning signs and concrete guideposts along the length of the Great Western Highway from Parramatta to Mount Victoria. One of these concrete guideposts survives on Reservoir Road east of the Manning Road junction. By 1939 the full length of the Great Western Highway was sealed and lined marked from Sydney to Bathurst.

The Great Western Road through Prospect continued its 1818 alignment for 150 years until 1968 when it was deviated to the north and straightened as the Prospect Deviation. The work was done to avoid the allegedly dangerous hills and bends on the Former Great Western Road, Prospect as it travelled over the flanks of Prospect Hill.

In 1948, the Great Western Highway was given the status of State Highway No 5. In the 1970s, the Western Freeway was constructed (and extended to Mays Hill in the 1990s) separating Reservoir Road and creating Tarlington Place in the east and Yallock Place and Boiler Close in the west. The western end of Reservoir Road was also deviated to the north to connect onto the new freeway creating and separating Boiler Close and Honeman Close. In the 1980s the four laned Western Highway and Prospect Deviation was widened to six lanes.

The isolation of the road at Prospect dragged against any intensification in development and subdivision, other than for rural uses (some fodder cropping and dairying, poultry etc.) and the area slipped into obscurity. In planning terms, this was formalised with the County of Cumberland Planning Scheme, established in 1951, which zoned the land north of the Great Western Highway as green belt. This action froze the land use and patterns north of the road providing a pocket of open space now encircled by modern land use and subdivisions. One unusual development, contrasting with the predominant rural uses north of the road, involved the establishment of the Blacktown Drive-In cinema in 1963 which is now the site of a regular weekend "trash and treasure" market.

In the 1990s the State Government commenced resumptions of privately owned land in the area for a special use and open space corridor. The road at Prospect is now within the Western Sydney Parklands, managed by the Parkland Trust on behalf of the NSW Government.

== Description ==
The alignment of the Former Great Western Road, Prospect, is laid onto the undulating ground to the north of Prospect Hill and to the north of Prospect Reservoir. This alignment (which was by-passed in 1968 for the present day alignment of the Great Western Highway) lies between the junction of Tarlington Place and the Great Western Highway in the east and travels almost 4 km south west, west and north west to the northern end of Honeman Close at its western extent. The alignment is now not continuous, but is cut by the M4 Motorway between Tarlington Place and Reservoir Road in the east and Yallock Place and Boiler Close in the west.

The alignment of the Former Great Western Road now includes four separately named sections of road. From east to west, the first section commences south of the Great Western Highway at Tarlington Place which terminates north of the M4 Motorway. The Former Great Western Road recommences south of the M4 as Reservoir Road and travels in a westerly direction through the intersection of the Prospect Highway along the boundary of the Prospect Reservoir until its junction with Yallock Place. It then travels north-west to the southern edge of the M4, where it is cut again by the motorway. It recommences north of the M4 as Boiler Close where it crosses the modern section of Reservoir Road to become Honeman Close, terminating south of the Great Western Highway.

A modern extension of Reservoir Road has been constructed from the junction of Reservoir Road and Yallock Place. It extends beneath the M4 Motorway and across the Great Western Highway into Blacktown. This modern section of Reservoir Road is not part of the nominated Former Great Western Road, Prospect.

The subject length of the former Great Western Road as it travels through Prospect contrasts with the straightness of most of the rest of the road from Parramatta to Penrith. The road winds gently up and over the low northern ridge and spurs of Prospect Hill, winding alongside the boundary of the Prospect Reservoir. Beyond the M4 Motorway, the last quarter of the alignment travels north-west down the slope towards the Great Western Highway.

=== Condition ===
For most of its length, the Former Great Western Road alignment consists of a two-laned asphalted pavement with mostly unformed edges that is flanked by wide gravelled and grassed shoulders. There is little obvious evidence of any major drainage infrastructure, other than the use of the sloping ground and the camber of the road, to shed stormwater.

The landscape through which the road travels is mostly open paddocks with stands of indigenous trees with some exotic species and remnants of low scale agricultural activities such as single houses, outbuildings, yards and lengths of fences. The land to the south of the road contains substantial indigenous regrowth within the Prospect Reservoir catchment. The current condition of the landscape (as at March 2012) is of quiet neglect with overgrown paddocks, collapsing fences and houses and sheds that are in need of some repair (with the well maintained Cricketers Arms Hotel a stark contrast) . Most of the landscape, the subdivision patterns and the elements, date from the 1930s and 1940s. The items are not individually significant but are collectively important as evidence of the former agricultural and pastoral use in the vicinity of the road.

The current alignment of most of the Former Great Western Road reflects the original alignment, notwithstanding the loss of the sections cut by the late twentieth century road works for the M4 and Prospect Highway. The asphalt surface has been resurfaced along Reservoir Road. Reservoir Road itself is in good condition. It is still maintained by Blacktown City Council as suitable for the moderate and constant volumes of traffic that use the road. Tarlington and Yallock Places and Boiler and Honeman Closes are in poorer condition. Parts of these sections of the road are closed by gates or cut by the M4; the pavement is degraded and the verges are overgrown. Nevertheless, the condition of these sections is mostly cosmetic and the principal feature of the road persists: that is the original alignment with little modern road infrastructure within a mostly open underdeveloped rural landscape (as at March 2012).

In terms of archaeology, it appears that any maintenance of the pavements, verges and any drainage infrastructure since the middle of the twentieth century has involved patching and laying new asphalt over the older layer and has not resulted in the removal of earlier pavements. The road was metalled in 1865 and asphalted in 1939.

Since the middle of the twentieth century it appears that most of the Reservoir Road section of the Former Great Western Road, between the intersection at Prospect Highway in the east and the junction with Yallock Place in the west, has not been widened and no major traffic management infrastructure such as traffic islands, roundabouts, lights have been installed (as at March 2012). Therefore, earlier pavement layers and drainage infrastructure may still be retained below the current road levels.

The alignment of the Former Great Western Road at Prospect and its character as an older, two-laned asphalted highway with unformed edges and verges is still clearly evident. This is despite the loss of some sections and changes wrought by the upgrades and construction of the Great Western and Prospect Highways and the M4 Motorway and its approaches. The road is still laid onto, and follows the undulations of, the original landforms as it winds up and over the flanks of Prospect Hill through a relatively underdeveloped former agricultural landscape. At the highest point of the route, just to the west of the intersection with Watch House Road, the views from the road to the Blue Mountains in the west and the Blacktown hills to the north (and to the 1841 St Bartholomew's Anglican Church) are impressive and still convey an understanding of the wider topography which travellers on the road would have experienced for almost 200 years. Long views to the south are now screened by the trees within the Prospect Reservoir surrounds and views to Sydney and to the east flank of Prospect Hill are now diminished by large sheds and infrastructure in the Pemulwuy industrial area.

The setting in the vicinity of the subject road at Prospect still retains its rural character with its early to mid-twentieth century subdivision pattern, built form, paddock enclosure and tree cover bordering the road. This survival is in contrast to the more intensive development elsewhere along the former Western Road which features widening to six lanes and substantial traffic infrastructure flanked by suburban, industrial and logistics infrastructure.

=== Modifications and dates ===
The Great Western Road at Prospect continued its 1818 alignment over the northern ridge of Prospect Hill until 1968 when the NSW Department of Main Roads bypassed the Prospect section by creating the Prospect Deviation to the north that provided a new straight and more direct alignment. The work was done to avoid the allegedly dangerous bends and slopes of the Former Great Western Road, Prospect.

In the 1970s, the Western Freeway (now the M4 Motorway), running parallel to the Highway, was constructed to terminate at the west end of the subject section. The freeway was extended to Mays Hill in the 1990s. Reservoir Road was deviated to the north to connect onto the new freeway (This deviated section is not part of the Former Great Western Road, Prospect nominated site). These constructions cut through the remnant Great Western Road alignment at Prospect and resulted the current arrangement of shorter lengths at the east and west ends. Nevertheless, the greater part of the road at Prospect is still retained in one section as Reservoir Road from the Prospect Highway roundabout to the junction with Yallock Place.

In the 1980s, the four-laned Great Western Highway was widened to six lanes from Parramatta to Penrith while the bypassed section—the Former Great Western Road, Prospect—remained a two-laned side road.

== Heritage listing ==
The Former Great Western Road, Prospect has exceptional state significance as the only surviving original alignment of the 1818 Great Western Road that itself most likely followed an earlier Aboriginal track for a route over Prospect Hill. The road has the potential to retain highly significant archaeology of the convict and colonial eras.

The Prospect Hill area has strong social and spiritual significance for Aboriginal people as a place regularly visited in pre-European times; as a meeting and trading place; as a place representative of early conflict between Aboriginal peoples and European settlers, and for its associations with the 1805 meeting which marked the beginning of the long road to reconciliation. The Prospect Heritage Study suggests that the alignment of the Former Great Western Road, Prospect may have followed an earlier Aboriginal track for a route over Prospect Hill which avoided the creeks and more flood prone and heavier ground to the north. The unaltered alignment of the Former Great Western Road, Prospect therefore has exceptional historical significance for its capacity to demonstrate a potential pre-contact as well as post-contact Aboriginal track.

The Former Great Western Road, Prospect demonstrates exceptional heritage significance as the only surviving original alignment and relatively undeveloped section of Governor Macquarie's Great Western Road, from Parramatta to Emu Ford on the Nepean River (near present-day Penrith) that was constructed by convict labour from 1815 to 1818 and that remains in use. The Western Road was an important piece of infrastructure stewarded by Governor Lachlan Macquarie as part of his wide-ranging town planning and infrastructure improvements to civilise the penal colony.

The Great Western Road was one of the three Great Roads built in the colony between 1815 and the 1840s. The others were the Great North Road (1826–36) and the Great South Road (1819-mid 1840s). The Great Roads were vital early colonial infrastructure designed to open up the colony to agricultural and pastoral production and European settlement beyond the Cumberland Plain. The discovery of the route over the Blue Mountains in 1813 dramatically refocused colonial attention to the fertile western plains beyond the mountains. The 1813 crossing was the catalyst for the essential role that the Great Western Road played in facilitating European expansion beyond the Sydney basin. From the 1820s the former Great Western Road quickly became the foremost route to the west. The section at Prospect was an intrinsic part of the route to the west until it was by-passed in 1968 for the present Great Western Highway alignment, and slipped into obscurity.

Except for the Former Great Western Road by-passed section at Prospect, the remainder of the carriageway of the Former Great Western Road has been substantially widened, straightened and levelled to ease and speed travel. Most of the Former Great Western Road, Prospect --- despite being cut in two places by the M4 and affected by traffic works at the intersection of the Prospect Highway and the M4 --- is still laid onto and follows the undulations of the original landforms as it winds up and over the northern ridge and flanks of Prospect Hill through a relatively undeveloped former agricultural landscape. The setting in the vicinity of the subject road at Prospect still retains a bucolic character with its early to mid-twentieth century subdivision pattern, scattered houses flanking the road, sheds and outbuildings, fences and paddock enclosures and mature tree cover (as at March 2012).

At the highest point of the route, just to the west of the intersection with Watch House Road, the views from the road to the Blue Mountains in the west and the Blacktown hills to the north still convey a powerful understanding of the wider topography and views and a sense of anticipation which travellers on the road would have experienced for over 180 years since the early nineteenth century. The experience of the road and the surrounding landscape at Prospect is intensified as the traveller realises that elsewhere along the road development has changed, and will continue to change and alienate open land.

The former Great Western Road at Prospect has important historical association with the Aboriginal people of the Prospect area as the probably alignment of an earlier Aboriginal route over Prospect Hill. It is directly associated with significant early colonial persons: William Cox of Clarendon (former Captain in the NSW Corps) who was contracted by Governor Macquarie to build the Western Road from Parramatta to Penrith (following his completion of the convict built Cox's Road across the Blue Mountains from Emu Plains to Bathurst in early 1815). Surveyor George Evans may have been responsible for establishing the alignment of the Former Great Western Road, as he had previously been instructed by Governor Lachlan Macquarie to identify a route through the Blue Mountains for the Cox's Road.

Given that the Former Great Western Road, Prospect, has not been substantially widened or improved since the middle of the twentieth century (except for intersections at the Great Western and Prospect Highways and in the vicinity of the M4) and that any road improvements that have taken place most likely involved new pavements over older layers, it is likely that the Former Great Western Road has the potential to retain highly significant archaeology of convict built infrastructure and of the colonial era.

Former Great Western Road, Prospect was listed on the New South Wales State Heritage Register on 27 June 2014 having satisfied the following criteria.

The place is important in demonstrating the course, or pattern, of cultural or natural history in New South Wales.

The Prospect Hill area has strong social and spiritual significance for Aboriginal people as a place regularly visited in pre-European times, as a meeting and trading place, as a place representative of early conflict between Aboriginal peoples and European settlers, and for its associations with the 1805 meeting which marked the beginning of the long road to reconciliation.

The Prospect Heritage Study (T Kass) suggests that the alignment of the Former Great Western Road, Prospect may have followed an earlier Aboriginal track for a route over Prospect Hill which avoided the creeks and more flood prone and heavier ground to the north. The unaltered alignment of the Former Great Western Road therefore has exceptional historical significance for its capacity to demonstrate a potential pre-contact as well as post-contact Aboriginal track.

The Former Great Western Road, Prospect demonstrates exceptional historical significance as a remnant surviving section of one of the three Great Roads (along with the Great North and Great South Roads) which were constructed between the 1820s and the 1840s by convict labour to open up the interior of the colony to agricultural and pastoral production and European settlement.

Prior to the crossing of the Blue Mountains in 1813, road transport out of Sydney and Parramatta to the Hawkesbury/Nepean edge had focused on expansion to the north and south. The discovery of the route over the Blue Mountains dramatically refocused colonial attention to the fertile western plains beyond the mountains and highlighted the essential role that the Great Western Road played in European expansion out of the Sydney basin. The former Great Western Road was the foremost route to the west and the section at Prospect was an intrinsic part of this route until it was by-passed in 1968. The 1968 deviation has, however, enabled the retention of the road's original alignment in a largely undeveloped semi-rural landscape (as at March 2012).

Elsewhere along the Western Road (except on the section at Prospect), the carriageway has been substantially widened, straightened and levelled to ease travel. The section at Prospect is the last section to follow its 1815 alignment as a narrow two- laned road. The road is still laid onto and follows the undulations of the original landforms as it winds up and over the flanks of Prospect Hill through a relatively underdeveloped former agricultural landscape. At the highest point of the route, just to the west of the intersection with Watch House Road, the views from the road to the Blue Mountains in the west and the Blacktown hills to the north still convey an understanding of the wider topography and views which travellers on the road for over 180 years would have experienced since the early nineteenth century (as at March 2012).

The place has a strong or special association with a person, or group of persons, of importance of cultural or natural history of New South Wales's history.

The Former Great Western Road at Prospect has state significance for its associations with Aboriginal people and with significant persons of the early colony of NSW.

The Prospect Heritage Study (T Kass) suggests that the alignment of the Former Great Western Road, Prospect may have followed an earlier Aboriginal track for a route over Prospect Hill which avoided the creeks and more flood prone and heavier ground to the north. The Prospect Hill area has strong social and spiritual significance for Aboriginal people as a place regularly visited in pre-European times, as a meeting and trading place, as a place representative of early conflict between Aboriginal peoples and European settlers, and for its associations with the 1805 meeting which marked the beginning of the long road to reconciliation.

The Former Great Western Road is directly associated with Governor Lachlan Macquarie, William Cox of Clarendon (former Captain in the NSW Corps and road builder of the early colony) and most probably with Surveyor George Evans.

Cox was the contractor requested by Governor Macquarie to build the Western Road from Parramatta to Penrith. Cox was also the contractor of the Cox's Road across the Blue Mountains that was constructed under Macquarie's orders from 1814-15.

The Western Road was an important piece of infrastructure stewarded by Governor Lachlan Macquarie as part of his wide-ranging town planning and infrastructure improvements to civilise the penal colony.

Surveyor Evans may have been responsible for establishing the alignment of the Western Road, as he was instructed by Macquarie to identify a route through the Blue Mountains for the building of the Cox's Road.

The place is important in demonstrating aesthetic characteristics and/or a high degree of creative or technical achievement in New South Wales.

The Former Great Western Road, Prospect has aesthetic and landmark significance at state level for its capacity to demonstrate the experience of travel with views of historical significance on a remnant section of the 1818 road that remains largely undeveloped and on its original 1818 alignment as it follows a ridge line and winds up and over the flanks of Prospect Hill in a semi-rural landscape with views of historical significance across to the Blue Mountains from the road's highest point close to Watch House Lane.

The views to the west to the Blue Mountains and to the north to the Blacktown hills still convey the sense of promise and anticipation to travellers, not felt on any other road out Sydney, as described by Helen Proudfoot.

The experience of the road and the surrounding landscape is intensified as the traveller realises that, elsewhere along the road, development has changed and will continue to change and alienate open land. The setting in the vicinity of the subject road at Prospect still retains a bucolic character with its early to mid-twentieth century subdivision pattern, built form, paddock enclosure and tree cover bordering the road. This survival is in contrast to the more intensive development elsewhere along the former Western Road which features road widening to six lanes and substantial traffic infrastructure flanked by suburban, industrial and logistics infrastructure.

The place has a strong or special association with a particular community or cultural group in New South Wales for social, cultural or spiritual reasons.

The Former Great Western Road has local significance under this criterion.

Based on research to date, the road itself does not appear to have any appreciable direct association with a particular European community or cultural group, past or present other than the residents and people that have lived on and used the road. Nevertheless, members of the local community have shown some esteem for the road and its rural character prompted by the recent demonstrations for its retention and care.

The place has potential to yield information that will contribute to an understanding of the cultural or natural history of New South Wales.

The Former Great Western Road, Prospect has the potential for state significant archaeology.

While there has been no formal extensive archaeological assessment of the Former Great Western Road, Prospect, there is every likelihood that the road has the potential to retain archaeology of convict built infrastructure of the early colonial period. This is based on the premise that the road has not been substantially widened or improved since the middle of the twentieth century and that any road improvements until then involved new pavements over older layers. Experience shows that when early roads are disturbed that evidence of earlier road fabric and surfaces may be revealed and that deposits which include archaeological "relics" may also be encountered.

The place possesses uncommon, rare or endangered aspects of the cultural or natural history of New South Wales.

The Former Great Western Road, Prospect is the only surviving section of Governor Macquarie's Great Western Road (completed in 1818) that follows its original alignment, is still in use and (at March 2012) remains relatively undeveloped.

The length of the former Great Western Road at Prospect following its 1818 alignment and flanked by an open rural landscape is a rare survivor of one of the Macquarie era Great Roads, particularly as the remainder of the Western Road from Parramatta to Penrith has been irrevocably and comprehensively altered by road improvements and development during the last 50 years.

The road at Prospect, despite the changes to its east and west lengths, remains as a legible rural landscape that retains its historic feel and integrity, with the views to the west and north. On the road, it is a rare opportunity for modern travellers to feel the sense of anticipation that the early road originally presented as described by Helen Proudfoot.

The place is important in demonstrating the principal characteristics of a class of cultural or natural places/environments in New South Wales.

The Former Great Western Road, Prospect has state significance for its capacity to demonstrate the characteristics of the Great Great Roads network of the early colonial period.

It remains in a largely undeveloped condition, retaining its original 1818 alignment (along a potential earlier Aboriginal track) with views of historical significance to the Blue Mountains and potential archaeology of convict-built infrastructure and the early colonial era.

The three Great Roads (constructed between 1815 and the 1840s) were the primary transport routes of the colony, built by convict labour, which remained under the control of the colonial government (rather than local road trusts).
