= Royal Cricketers Arms Inn =

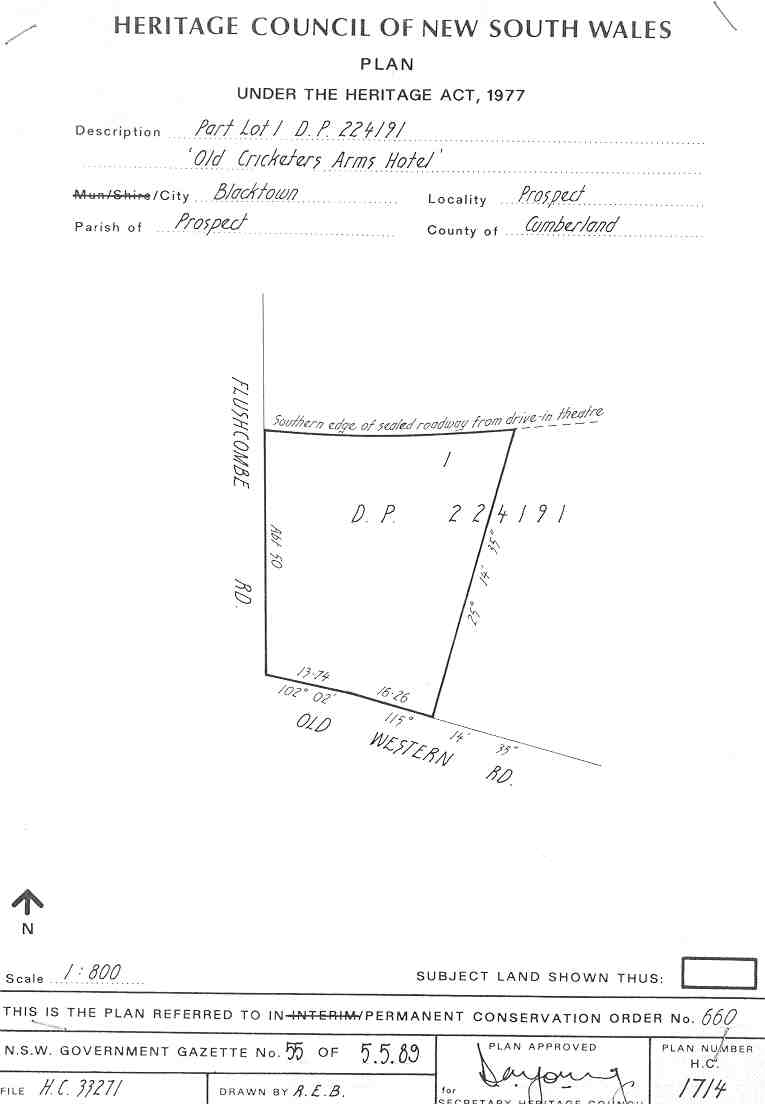
- Heritage boundaries

- Location within Sydney
- 33°48′26″S 150°54′10″E
- Location: 385 Reservoir Road, Prospect, City of Blacktown, New South Wales, Australia

Site notes
- Architect: James Manning
- Owner: Department of Planning and Infrastructure

New South Wales Heritage Register
- Official name: Royal Cricketers Arms Inn; Cricketers Arms Inn
- Type: State heritage (built)
- Designated: 2 April 1999
- Reference no.: 660
- Type: Inn/Tavern
- Category: Commercial
- Builders: James Manning

Royal Cricketers Arms Inn is a heritage-listed Australian pub at 385 Reservoir Road, Prospect, New South Wales, a suburb of Sydney, Australia. It was designed by James Manning and built by James Manning. It is also known as Cricketers Arms Inn. It was added to the New South Wales State Heritage Register on 2 April 1999.

== History ==
=== Aboriginal & European settler history ===
The area of Prospect Reservoir is an area of known Aboriginal occupation, with favourable camping locations along the Eastern Creek and Prospect Creek catchments, and in elevated landscapes to the south. There is also evidence to suggest that the occupation of these lands continued after European contact, through discovery of intermingled glass and stone flakes in archaeological surveys of the place. The area was settled by Europeans by 1789.

Prospect Hill, Sydney's largest body of igneous rock, lies centrally in the Cumberland Plain and dominates the landscape of the area. Very early after first settlement, on 26 April 1788, an exploration party heading west led by Governor Phillip, climbed Prospect Hill. An account by Phillip states that the exploration party saw from Prospect Hill, "for the first time since we landed Carmathen [sic] Hills (Blue Mountains) as likewise the hills to the southward". Phillip's "Bellevue" (Prospect Hill) acquired considerable significance for the new settlers. Prospect Hill provided a point from which distances could be meaningfully calculated, and became a major reference point for other early explorers. When Watkin Tench made another official journey to the west in 1789, he began his journey with reference to Prospect Hill, which commanded a view of the great chain of mountains to the west. A runaway convict, George Bruce, used Prospect Hill as a hideaway from soldiers in the mid-1790s.

During the initial struggling years of European settlement in NSW, Governor Phillip began to settle time-expired convicts on the land as farmers, after the success of James Ruse at Rose Hill. On 18 July 1791 Phillip placed a number of men on the eastern and southern slopes of Prospect Hill, as the soils weathered from the basalt cap were richer than the sandstone derived soils of the Cumberland Plain. The grants, mostly 30 acres, encircled Prospect Hill. The settlers included William Butler, James Castle, Samuel Griffiths, John Herbert, George Lisk, Joseph Morley, John Nicols, William Parish and Edward Pugh.

The arrival of the first settlers prompted the first organised Aboriginal resistance to the spread of settlement, with the commencement of a violent frontier conflict in which Pemulwuy and his Bidjigal clan played a central role. On 1 May 1801 Governor King took drastic action, issuing a public order requiring that Aboriginal people around Parramatta, Prospect Hill and Georges River should be "driven back from the settlers" habitations by firing at them'. King's edicts appear to have encouraged a shoot-on-sight attitude whenever any Aboriginal men, women or children appeared.

With the death of Pemulwuy, the main resistance leader, in 1802, Aboriginal resistance gradually diminished near Parramatta, although outer areas were still subject to armed hostilities. Prompted by suggestions to the Reverend Samuel Marsden by local Prospect Aboriginal groups that a conference should take place "with a view of opening the way to reconciliation", Marsden promptly organised a meeting near Prospect Hill. At the meeting, held on 3 May 1805, local Aboriginal representatives discussed with Marsden ways of ending the restrictions and indiscriminate reprisals inflicted on them by soldiers and settlers in response to atrocities committed by other Aboriginal clans. The meeting was significant because a group of Aboriginal women and a young free settler at Prospect named John Kennedy acted as intermediaries. The conference led to the end of the conflict for the Aboriginal clans around Parramatta and Prospect. This conference at Prospect on Friday 3 May 1805 is a landmark in Aboriginal/European relations. Macquarie's "Native Feasts" held at Parramatta from 1814 followed the precedent set in 1805. The Sydney Gazette report of the meeting is notable for the absence of the sneering tone that characterised its earlier coverage of Aboriginal matters.

From its commencement in 1791 with the early settlement of the area, agricultural use of the land continued at Prospect Hill. Much of the land appears to have been cleared by the 1820s and pastoral use of the land was well established by then. When Governor Macquarie paid a visit to the area in 1810, he was favourably impressed by the comfortable conditions that had been created.

Nelson Lawson, third son of explorer William Lawson (1774-1850), married Honoria Mary Dickinson and before 1837 built "Greystanes House" as their future family home on the western side of Prospect Hill. Lawson had received the land from his father, who had been granted 500 acres here by the illegal government that followed the overthrow of Governor Bligh in 1808.

Governor Macquarie confirmed the grant, where William Lawson had built a house, which he called "Veteran Hall", because he had a commission in the NSW Veterans Company. The house was demolished in 1928 and the site is now partly covered by the waters of Prospect Reservoir. Greystanes was approached by a long drive lined with an avenue of English trees - elms (Ulmus procera), hawthorns (Crataegus sp.), holly (Ilex aquifolium), and woodbine (Clematis sp.) mingling with jacarandas (Jacaranda mimosifolia). It had a wide, semi-circular front verandah supported by 4 pillars. The foundations were of stone, the roof of slate, and the doors and architraves of heavy red cedar. It was richly furnished with articles of the best quality available and was the scene of many glittering soirees attended by the elite of the colony. Honoria Lawson died in 1845, Nelson remarried a year later, but died in 1849, and the property reverted to his father. Greystanes house was demolished in the 1940s (Pollon, 1988, 116, amended Read, S., 2006 - the house can't have been "on the crest" of Prospect Hill as Pollon states, if its site was covered by the Reservoir).

By the 1870s, with the collapse of the production of cereal grains across the Cumberland Plain, the Prospect Hill area appears to have largely been devoted to livestock. The dwellings of the earliest settlers largely appear to have been removed by this stage. By the time that any mapping was undertaken in this vicinity, most of these structures had disappeared, making their locations difficult to pinpoint.

The land was farmed from 1806-1888 when the Prospect Reservoir was built. In 1867, the Governor of NSW appointed a Commission to recommend a scheme for Sydney's water supply, and by 1869 it was recommended that construction commence on the Upper Nepean Scheme. This consisted of two diversion weirs, located at Pheasant's Nest and Broughton's Pass, in the Upper Nepean River catchment, with water feeding into a series of tunnels, canals and aqueducts known as the Upper Canal. It was intended that water be fed by gravity from the catchment into a reservoir at Prospect. This scheme was to be Sydney's fourth water supply system, following the Tank Stream, Busby's Bore and the Botany (Lachlan) Swamps.

Designed and constructed by the Public Works Department of NSW, Prospect Reservoir was built during the 1880s and completed in 1888. Credit for the Upper Nepean Scheme is largely given to Edward Orpen Moriarty, the Engineer in Chief of the Harbours and Rivers Branch of the Public Works Department from 1858-88.

=== The Prospect Hotel ===
The first official record of a hotel at Prospect is in 1876 when the town is described as having a post office, a hotel - "The Prospect" - a public school and an Anglican and Catholic Church. A further record in 1902 indicates a second hotel opening at Prospect in that year.

James Manning was issued a publican's license on 13 September 1881 for the Royal Cricketer's Arms Hotel which indicates that the hotel was already built by that date, and that the building was built as a hotel. It is likely that the hotel operated briefly prior to the issue of the licence. Manning also operated a race track and a cricket pitch on the property and it was a popular site for picnics. It is likely, but not certain, that the name of the hotel came from Manning's interest in cricket being a member of the local Prospect Cricket Team.

Various mortgages were taken out to expand the hotel during the 1880s, the boom period for the village of Prospect. In 1881 Manning again mortgaged the property, this time to the Bank of New South Wales. This correlates to the time when he and one of the Neave (sic) family commenced operating the Flushcombe Stores and Butchers adjacent to Manning's hotel on the corner of Flushcombe and Western Roads. This was advertised in the local paper saying they sold groceries, beef, boots, clothing and ironmongery. An 1883 advertisement noted they had been operating for two years. The exact location of the store is unclear but it appears on an 1884 subdivision plan as a structure behind the hotel. It is also possible the hotel was extended by this time with the western wing that was clearly set up as a separate retail outlet connected with the hotel activity. Manning took out other mortgages in 1882 and 1883. It is unlikely these were to build the hotel, but could have been to expand the business, perhaps to build and stock the store at the rear and side of the hotel. Construction of the Prospect Reservoir was underway by this time (1879-1888) and there is little doubt that the construction of the hotel and expansion into the general store was related to the influx of people associated with that work. Reservoir construction had been mooted since the late 1860s but did not commence until 1880 giving Manning considerable time to plan the hotel venture.

By 1870 the stone quarry on Prospect Hill had also been opened to supply blue metal to Sydney and for local road building. The Main Western railway to Blacktown opened in 1860 and the hotel was on the corner of Flushcombe Road, the main access to the station. This would have placed Manning in an ideal position to capitalise on the workforce on the Reservoir as they moved to and from Blacktown. The winding down of the Reservoir construction occurred at the same time that Manning was in financial trouble and it is possible that he overestimated the potential of the business after the Reservoir was complete. He also undertook the subdivision of the remainder of his land during this period, retaining a three acre block around the hotel and store. An 1884 auction led to blocks slowly selling from that time.

The period from 1870 through to the depression of the 1890s was the boom period for the village of Prospect. It saw intensification of activity related to the Reservoir construction and introduction of mining activity on Prospect Hill.

In 1889 ownership of the hotel was transferred to Hugh McCue, who mortgaged the property back to Manning. Business continued to deteriorate and Manning eventually died in 1927, aged 73. A trustee was appointed for the property and the bank foreclosed on the mortgage of the remaining 28 acres but maintained the hotel in operation. Licenses were granted in 1895 and 1899 to a Sarah Roche. The hotel continued to operate until 1906 when it is believed to have ceased operation. The hotel use appears to have survived until the sale in 1913, although a history of the area written in 1906 refers to a hotel called "The Prospect" as the only hotel operating in the area, indicating that (by then) the Cricketer's Arms had ceased operation.

=== Farming and market gardening ===
On 31 March 1913 the Permanent Trustee Company conveyed the balance of the unsold subdivision including the three acre block containing the hotel to Edward F. Cooney, labourer, of Prospect. Cooney had married Florence Manning (James' daughter). Cooney also bought Lots 18 and 19 of Block 3 from James Harkins (1916) who had acquired the blocks in 1887 from Manning. Cooney operated a dairy farm on the property with up to 100 cows. His daughters established a tea room and local store in the former hotel. It is likely that the extensions to the kitchen, including rear verandah, were added during this period.

The climate is bracing, and originally the area was used by orchardists and poultry farmers. Gradually extensive manufacturing establishments moved into the area, and by 1923 brickworks, tile works, and a hat-making factory were located there.

Cooney held the property until 1937 when he transferred the whole of his acquisitions to Arthur Joseph and Emily M. Ballard, farmers, of Coolah. They sold it in 1939 to Eric Kirsten, a Swiss-born farmer from Blacktown. It was sold again in 1941 to Croatian immigrants, Ivan Posa and Ivan Segedin (brothers-in-law), the latter transferring his half share to Posa in 1942. Posa operated the property as a large market garden growing tomatoes and table grapes. The hotel was used as a residence by the Posa family and it appears to have been used as a residence by previous owners during the farming period.

=== 1963+ Drive-in Theatre ===
Posa occupied the property until 1963 when he transferred the whole of the site to the Great Western Drive-In Theatre P/L.

Great Western constructed the drive-in on most of the land leaving part of the three acre block around the hotel and the Western Road frontage allotments that are now included in the site boundary. The hotel was used as a caretaker's residence until 1989.

The decline in the area is further seen in the lack of interest in taking up the various subdivisions in the area. Apart from the drive-in theatre, the area around the hotel has changed little during the twentieth century.

The 1913-2001 period also reflects the major shift in government planning policy from the 1950 period to the present day. The area of policy that has most greatly affected the Prospect locality was the creation of special use and open space corridors and the passing of the 1979 Environmental Planning & Assessment Act and consequent creation of the Sydney Region Development Fund. This provided the funding base required to implement the planning scheme and resulted in acquisition of the land around the hotel site. The change of use to open space, the location of the Reservoir lands, the realignment of the Great Western Highway and then the further separation of the Prospect area by construction of the M4 freeway in the late 1980s that saw Flushcombe Road and other major connecting roads severed combined to further separate the locality.

=== 1989+ Conservation and revival ===
The property became successively more derelict until 1989 when the Department of Planning (then) placed a Permanent Conservation Order on it and purchased the 2.3ha property. The building was vacant and suffered considerable vandalism prior to being secured and fenced in 1990. The Department commissioned a conservation management plan in 1991 and undertook conservation works in 1992.

The property was leased to James Kellie and further restored with a $300,000 internal restoration, reopening as a hotel in 1994.

Photographs from 1993 show the brush box, jacaranda trees to the hotel's west; an oleander bush to the south (Reservoir Road), bottle brush trees and a line of golden cypresses to the north (the last of which have been removed). A number of garden plantings were installed in both the front and rear yards, including terraced paved areas north of the hotel.

A subsequent restoration in 1996 included the reinstatement of some building features that had been removed.

The revived hotel continues to operate, and is currently run by the Australian Securities Exchange-listed Event Hospitality and Entertainment.

== Description ==
=== Hotel ===
A two storey brick and timber building with 9" solid brick external and internal walls on the ground floor and timber walls on the upper floor, except for the gable end walls which are brick. All of the masonry walls are plastered internally and rendered externally. The building sits on an irregular stone base with a cellar under the main front room and a storage space with access from an external opening in the foundation wall. The building has a galvanised iron painted roof and there is no evidence of an earlier roof type. It appears that the iron roof dates from either the period of construction or when the first extensions were carried out as evidence of change can be seen in the roof sheeting where an early chimney was removed. A small weather board clad room protrudes from the roof. There is a galvanised roof to the verandah, with timber posts, decorative timber brackets and timber floor.

The building is in highly intact condition and has retained a high degree of integrity.

=== Site ===
A small narrow garden lies between the hotel's front and Reservoir Road, with lawn area and low shrubs and perennials lining a timber picket fence to the road. A paved area of tables allows patrons to sit outside on the west side of one of two entry gates and paths. On the eastern perimeter is a variegated Kermadec Island pohutukawa (Metrosideros kermadecensis 'Variegata'). Along the front picket fence are taller shrubs including oleanders (Nerium oleander cv.) and bird-of-paradise flower (Strelitzia reginae) and hardy perennials such as Nile lilies (Agapanthus orientalis) and fruit-salad plant (Monstera deliciosa).

Lawn areas are restricted to the west of the hotel, between the brush box tree and rear access drive, and the north-east and east of the hotel, comprising almost half the rear yard. The other half of the rear yard is paved with either masonry paving cobble stones, gravel or areas are mulched (children's play area to the north-east corner).

To the north and east of the hotel garden plantings of trees have been installed in the side and rear yards, including terraced paved areas north of the hotel, a covered area with timber framed roofing; a converted corrugated iron shed and other shelters. A small car park is further north and downhill, screened by hedging and fencing.

Principal trees on site consist of weeping willows to the east (several Salix babylonica 'Pendula'), a Hill's fig (Ficus microcarpa) "Hillii" on the north-eastern boundary, a carob bean (Ceratonia siliqua) further north.

The south-western corner has a large old brush box tree (Lophostemon confertus) shading the front outdoor seating area and this corner of the hotel. To the north of an access driveway rear of the hotel a jacaranda (Jacaranda mimosifolia) shades an outdoor terrace. The rear (northern) yard has a large Brazilian pepper tree (Schinus molle var.areira) near the central rear access steps to the hotel. Further north and downhill are large bottlebrush trees (Callistemon viminalis cv.s).

=== Archaeological potential ===
It was reported in 1998 that the site may have some archaeological potential, however this was unlikely following the extensive conservation works which took place during the 1996 restoration.

The conservation work carried out in 1991-2 involved an assessment of archaeological potential of the site. That report's recommendations were that a monitoring brief was required to assess excavation for services and underpinning work required. The excavations established that there was little archaeological material on the site in any of the locations excavated. Later works in providing the sewerage treatment plant also revealed no information or potential in the northern section of the site.

It would appear that the period from 1913 onwards and particularly from 1941 reworked the grounds of the site so extensively that all trace of surface or near-surface material that may have existed was removed.

While several artefacts were found between floors in the hotel building (now in the possession of the Department of Urban Affairs & Planning), virtually no items were found under or around the building.

The archaeological resource of the place is poorly presented due to prior site activity. Most of the site (with the exception of some potential in the underfloor areas of the hotel building, and the area beneath the detached toilets) is consequently zoned as being of low archaeological significance. Ground disturbance works do not require monitoring. However if relics, such as artefacts or in-situ building elements are exposed then work should cease and professional advice be sought as required by the NSW Heritage Act.

== Heritage listing ==
The Cricketers Arms Hotel is a place of State significance for its historical values and of local significance for its aesthetic, creative and associational values. The place is rare as an example of a mid-Victorian country hotel in the Sydney area but also for its context and setting that retain much of the character of the area and remain largely unaltered over the last 100 years.

The place has the ability to demonstrate the State Historical Themes of land Tenure, development (and failure) of Townships, Transport and its role in determining patterns of development, the provision of Utilities as seen in the construction of the Prospect Reservoir, the development of Commerce in early settlements and the role of Individuals in the settlement of Western Sydney.

The site and buildings are powerful invocations of early western Sydney and its development.

Royal Cricketers Arms Inn was listed on the New South Wales State Heritage Register on 2 April 1999 having satisfied the following criteria.

The place is important in demonstrating the course, or pattern, of cultural or natural history in New South Wales.

The Cricketers Arms Hotel is one of a small group of surviving structures in the Prospect area, one of the earliest settlements west of Parramatta. The other notable buildings are St. Bartholomew's Anglican Church (1841), the structures related to the late 19th Century reservoir and the former Prospect Post Office.

Prospect is significant for its associations with early exploration, the first sub-division of land in the district and associations with significant early settlers and landholders.

- The hotel, although not specifically to function as a "roadside inn", is the last surviving hotel on the old western road providing evidence of the pattern of use of that early link to the west and the development along it.
- The hotel construction is closely linked to the construction of the Prospect Reservoir, a major engineering undertaking of the 1880s that provided the water supply to Sydney. The success and later decline of the hotel business are closely linked to the construction activity of the reservoir. The building is evidence of an early business venture on the outskirts of Sydney and the attempts to establish new townships. The failure of the business demonstrates the impact of the railway in the development of Sydney and the movement of trade and transport routes to the railway away from the earlier established road routes.
- The hotel building is a rare and very good example of a country hotel surviving on the outskirts of Sydney. (regional)

The place has a strong or special association with a person, or group of persons, of importance of cultural or natural history of New South Wales's history.

The site has links to the early owners including Robert Flushcombe, a member of the NSW Corps.

- Locally the site is associated with the Neeve and Manning families who were early settlers in the Prospect area. They occupied the site from 1869 until the 1930s. They were a significant family in the Prospect area and contributed to the social history of the area.
- The place has the ability to demonstrate early patterns of use related to recreation and associated uses to the hotel and stores and as part of the civic and social life of Prospect.

The place is important in demonstrating aesthetic characteristics and/or a high degree of creative or technical achievement in New South Wales.

The building demonstrates aesthetic achievement and is an example of mid-Victorian country hotel construction and design that is rare in the Sydney area and the areas closer to Sydney. The building demonstrates an unusual form that contrasts with hotels being constructed in inner Sydney at the same time.

- The building demonstrates good detailing and joinery, competent design and the use of unusual features such as the asymmetrically located cantilevered balcony to the upper level. The building demonstrates the (unfounded) confidence of its builder in the future of the area.
- The building and site retain early fitout and features that are also rare as most hotel buildings have had at least one and often many refits that removed most of their significant form and fitout.

The place has a strong or special association with a particular community or cultural group in New South Wales for social, cultural or spiritual reasons.

The site and buildings have some value to the present community of Blacktown who patronise the hotel.

The place has potential to yield information that will contribute to an understanding of the cultural or natural history of New South Wales.

- The site and buildings have the rare ability to demonstrate a pattern of development of early Sydney that is almost lost and survives in remnant form. This is seen here in the buildings themselves but also the setting along an undeveloped section of the Old Western Road that has retained mush of its early appearance and context. The overall setting of the building on the Old Western Road is of high significance.
- The building has the ability to demonstrate a pattern of use that is rare as it retains its planned function within the spaces planned for that use. Despite the introduction of some modern services the building demonstrates a use within a setting that is rare.
- The building history also demonstrates changes in use from hotel and shop to residence and farm and back to hotel use, changes that reflect the changing nature of the Prospect area.
- The site and building have low archaeological significance s the archaeological evidence is poor and note reflective of the historic or significant use of the site.

The place possesses uncommon, rare or endangered aspects of the cultural or natural history of New South Wales.

The building and setting are rare within the Sydney area.

The place is important in demonstrating the principal characteristics of a class of cultural or natural places/environments in New South Wales.

- The buildings are excellent examples of early hotel construction and fitout.
- The site retains its historic setting with boundaries from early sub-division still understandable and discernible.
