= Prospect Post Office =

Prospect Post Office (former)
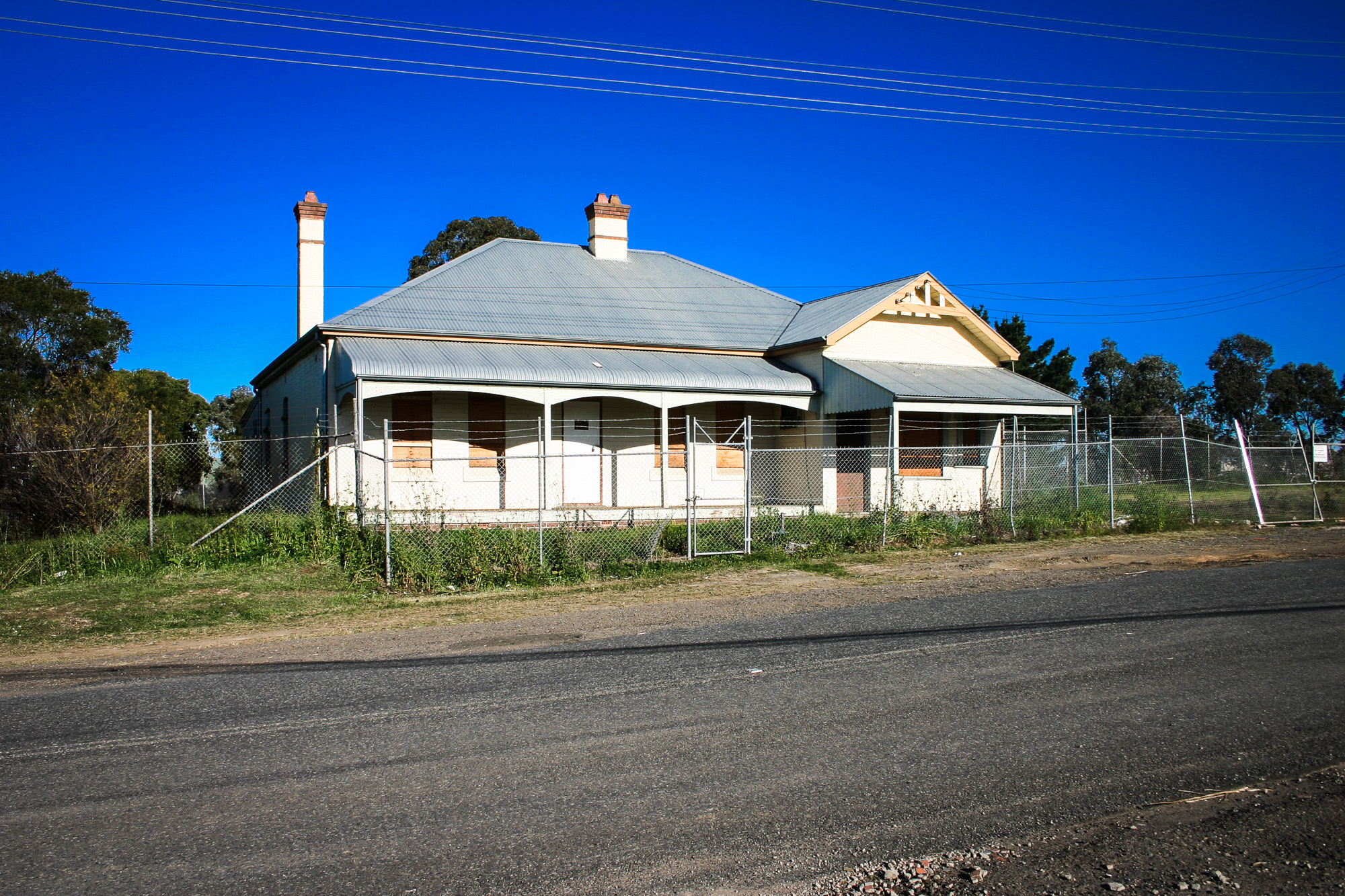

- Location within Sydney
- 33°48′20″S 150°55′24″E
- Location: 23 Tarlington Place, Prospect, City of Blacktown, New South Wales, Australia

History
- Built: 1880–1890

Site notes
- Architect: James Watts
- Owner: Department of Planning and Infrastructure

New South Wales Heritage Register
- Official name: Prospect Post Office (former); Prospect Post Office
- Type: State heritage (built)
- Designated: 2 April 1999
- Reference no.: 1385
- Type: Post Office
- Category: Postal and Telecommunications
- Builders: James Watts

Prospect Post Office is a heritage-listed former post office and shop at 23 Tarlington Place, Prospect, City of Blacktown, New South Wales, Australia. It was designed by James Watts and built by Watts from 1880 to 1890. The property is owned by the City of Blacktown. It was added to the New South Wales State Heritage Register on 2 April 1999.

== History ==
=== Aboriginal & European settler history ===
The area of Prospect Reservoir is an area of known Aboriginal occupation, with favourable camping locations along the Eastern Creek and Prospect Creek catchments, and in elevated landscapes to the south. There is also evidence to suggest that the occupation of these lands continued after European contact, through discovery of intermingled glass and stone flakes in archaeological surveys of the place. The area was settled by Europeans by 1789.

Prospect Hill, Sydney's largest body of igneous rock, lies centrally in the Cumberland Plain and dominates the landscape of the area. Very early after first settlement, on 26 April 1788, an exploration party heading west led by Governor Phillip, climbed Prospect Hill. An account by Phillip states that the exploration party saw from Prospect Hill, "for the first time since we landed Carmathen [sic] Hills (Blue Mountains) as likewise the hills to the southward". Phillip's "Bellevue" (Prospect Hill) acquired considerable significance for the new settlers. Prospect Hill provided a point from which distances could be meaningfully calculated, and became a major reference point for other early explorers. When Watkin Tench made another official journey to the west in 1789, he began his journey with reference to Prospect Hill, which commanded a view of the great chain of mountains to the west. A runaway convict, George Bruce, used Prospect Hill as a hideaway from soldiers in the mid-1790s.

During the initial struggling years of European settlement in NSW, Governor Phillip began to settle time-expired convicts on the land as farmers, after the success of James Ruse at Rose Hill. On 18 July 1791, Phillip placed a number of men on the eastern and southern slopes of Prospect Hill, as the soils weathered from the basalt cap were richer than the sandstone derived soils of the Cumberland Plain. The grants, mostly 30 acres, encircled Prospect Hill. The settlers included William Butler, James Castle, Samuel Griffiths, John Herbert, George Lisk, Joseph Morley, John Nicols, William Parish and Edward Pugh.

The arrival of the first settlers prompted the first organised Aboriginal resistance to the spread of settlement, with the commencement of a violent frontier conflict in which Pemulwuy and his Bidjigal clan played a central role. On 1 May 1801 Governor King took drastic action, issuing a public order requiring that Aboriginal people around Parramatta, Prospect Hill and Georges River should be "driven back from the settlers" habitations by firing at them'. King's edicts appear to have encouraged a shoot-on-sight attitude whenever any Aboriginal men, women or children appeared.

With the death of Pemulwuy, the main resistance leader, in 1802, Aboriginal resistance gradually diminished near Parramatta, although outer areas were still subject to armed hostilities. Prompted by suggestions to the Reverend Marsden by local Prospect Aboriginal groups that a conference should take place "with a view of opening the way to reconciliation", Marsden promptly organised a meeting near Prospect Hill. At the meeting, held on 3 May 1805, local Aboriginal representatives discussed with Marsden ways of ending the restrictions and indiscriminate reprisals inflicted on them by soldiers and settlers in response to atrocities committed by other Aboriginal clans. The meeting was significant because a group of Aboriginal women and a young free settler at Prospect named John Kennedy acted as intermediaries. The conference led to the end of the conflict for the Aboriginal clans around Parramatta and Prospect. This conference at Prospect on Friday 3 May 1805 is a landmark in Aboriginal/European relations. Macquarie's "Native Feasts" held at Parramatta from 1814 followed the precedent set in 1805. The Sydney Gazette report of the meeting is notable for the absence of the sneering tone that characterised its earlier coverage of Aboriginal matters.

From its commencement in 1791 with the early settlement of the area, agricultural use of the land continued at Prospect Hill. Much of the land appears to have been cleared by the 1820s and pastoral use of the land was well established by then. When Governor Macquarie paid a visit to the area in 1810, he was favourably impressed by the comfortable conditions that had been created.

Nelson Lawson, third son of explorer William Lawson (1774-1850), married Honoria Mary Dickinson and before 1837 built "Greystanes House" as their future family home on the western side of Prospect Hill. Lawson had received the land from his father, who had been granted 500 acres here by the illegal government that followed the overthrow of Governor Bligh in 1808.

Governor Macquarie confirmed the grant, where William Lawson had built a house, which he called "Veteran Hall", because he had a commission in the NSW Veterans Company. The house was demolished in 1928 and the site is now partly covered by the waters of Prospect Reservoir. Greystanes was approached by a long drive lined with an avenue of English trees - elms (Ulmus procera), hawthorns (Crataegus sp.), holly (Ilex aquifolium), and woodbine (Clematis sp.) mingling with jacarandas (Jacaranda mimosifolia). It had a wide, semi-circular front verandah supported by 4 pillars. The foundations were of stone, the roof of slate, and the doors and architraves of heavy red cedar. It was richly furnished with articles of the best quality available and was the scene of many glittering soirees attended by the elite of the colony. Honoria Lawson died in 1845, Nelson remarried a year later, but died in 1849, and the property reverted to his father. Greystanes house was demolished in the 1940s (Pollon, 1988, 116, amended Read, S., 2006 - the house can't have been "on the crest" of Prospect Hill as Pollon states, if its site was covered by the Reservoir).

By the 1870s, with the collapse of the production of cereal grains across the Cumberland Plain, the Prospect Hill area appears to have largely been devoted to livestock. The dwellings of the earliest settlers largely appear to have been removed by this stage. By the time that any mapping was undertaken in this vicinity, most of these structures had disappeared, making their locations difficult to pinpoint.

The land was farmed from 1806 to 1888 when the Prospect Reservoir was built. In 1867, the Governor of NSW appointed a Commission to recommend a scheme for Sydney's water supply, and by 1869 it was recommended that construction commence on the Upper Nepean Scheme. This consisted of two diversion weirs, located at Pheasant's Nest and Broughton's Pass, in the Upper Nepean River catchment, with water feeding into a series of tunnels, canals and aqueducts known as the Upper Canal. It was intended that water be fed by gravity from the catchment into a reservoir at Prospect. This scheme was to be Sydney's fourth water supply system, following the Tank Stream, Busby's Bore and the Botany (Lachlan) Swamps.

Designed and constructed by the Public Works Department of NSW, Prospect Reservoir was built during the 1880s and completed in 1888. Credit for the Upper Nepean Scheme is largely given to Edward Orpen Moriarty, the Engineer in Chief of the Harbours and Rivers Branch of the Public Works Department from 1858 to 1888.

=== Prospect Post Office ===
The Prospect Post Office is believed to have operated from as early as 1871, in an earlier timber structure on the site. The present building was constructed between 1880 and 1890 and was clearly a more substantial structure with its separate shop and post office area, reflecting the growing prosperity of the Watts family. Watts' store and post office became the focus of the small village of Prospect that slowly developed with the gradual sub-division of Kennedy's 1799 grant. James Watt operated the general store and post office until his death in 1898 and was succeeded by his wife, Mary Ann who continued operating the business until her death in 1909 at which time a local builder, George Henry, took over the business and occupied the house with his wife and their 4 children. Shortly after he assumed control of the business, George added a butcher's shop housed in a separate timber structure to the south of the house. A number of other associated structures were also constructed around this time. The village of Prospect reached its peak of development around 1923.

Following his death, the property was transferred to George's widow, Grace, in 1925 and she occupied the house until her death in 1944. Her daughter Georgina continued as post mistress during this period and her other daughter, Ethel, worked as housekeeper and shop assistant. The shop, which later included tea rooms, slowly declined and its function as a post office ceased entirely after Grace's death in 1946 and the subsequent sale of the property to Archibald White, although he did continue to operate the store. The property changed hands numerous times between 1949 and 1976 when it was finally purchased by the NSW Planning and Environment Commission as part of an open space corridor provision.

The building underwent extensive conservation/renovation works in 1997–98. However, it subsequently remained vacant for many years. In October 2015, the state government gave the building to the City of Blacktown, who were interested in again restoring the building and possibly transforming it into a shop or cafe.

== Description ==
The site comprises a triangular shaped piece of land (truncated by the freeway construction to the south) fronting Tarlington Place. The land contains the former shop, residence and post office on the front alignment, a garage and lean to at the rear, stables to the south west and various paths and foundations of structures that have been removed. The main building is of brick, the garage is timber framed and asbestos cement clad. The stables are timber framed and roughly lined and the pavements are predominantly concrete. The main building is of brick with a hipped corrugated iron roof and projecting gable end addressing the street, which housed the post office/store. A bull nosed verandah, supported on turned timber posts and with a simple but distinctive timber valence, runs across the front of the house. There is also a rear verandah/sleep out which was always roofed but not fully enclosed.

The building underwent extensive conservation/renovation works in 1997–98. It was reported at that time that the site had moderate archaeological potential associated with its former uses, and that it was substantially intact and following its renovation, much of the building fabric's integrity had been restored.

== Heritage listing ==
The former Prospect Post Office is of high local significance as the last surviving building of the former Prospect Village and as the site of the Post Office for over 100 years. It has social, historical, aesthetic and scientific value related to its function, its occupants and its role in the development of the district. The building and site have State significance related to the themes of early development of the Sydney region, commercial development and service. It is a representative building typifying small village development from the last century and retains elements of its setting and relationship to the former Western Road.

Prospect Post Office was listed on the New South Wales State Heritage Register on 2 April 1999 having satisfied the following criteria.

The place is important in demonstrating the course, or pattern, of cultural or natural history in New South Wales.

The former Prospect Post Office is of historic significance as the last surviving building from the former village of Prospect. It demonstrates the history of the village and marks the village. It is the only surviving physical reminder of the village. The building has been associated with the local community through its function as a post office and store and through its close association with the adjacent butchers shop and dance hall. The building demonstrates the physical development of the village and provides continuity with the early development of the area. The building was the home of the Watts family, a prominent local family who were instrumental in the development of the village and local commerce and community facilities.

The place is important in demonstrating aesthetic characteristics and/or a high degree of creative or technical achievement in New South Wales.

The former Prospect Post Office is of aesthetic significance as a good representative example of building design from the late Victorian period and demonstrates the aesthetic preferences and aspirations of a small village society. The building has well designed detail, particularly around the shop front and is generally a pleasing building of good proportion and form. The building is one of the last remnants of an early picturesque village, retaining its relationship to the original road alignment, that can demonstrate the relationships of site, building and road and the "picturesque" nature of the building in the landscape.

The place has a strong or special association with a particular community or cultural group in New South Wales for social, cultural or spiritual reasons.

The former Prospect Post Office is of social significance as one of the central buildings in the village of Prospect from the 1870s to the time of the village's demise in the late 1950s. As the post office, general store and butchers it was the business centre of the village and point of contact for many of the residents and was related to the Watts family, key figures in the village, who were pivotal in the village's fortunes through 80 years of occupancy. The building is the last physical structure from the village and is a reminder of the development of the area that has connection with the earliest establishment of the district. Along with the surviving church, the building provides a physical link to the history of the area and allows an understanding of the nature of the village and the relationship of the village to the church.

The place has potential to yield information that will contribute to an understanding of the cultural or natural history of New South Wales.

The former Prospect Post Office is of technical significance for its connection with early industry, the butchers shop and ancillary facilities and in particular the slaughterhouse and yards nearby.

The place possesses uncommon, rare or endangered aspects of the cultural or natural history of New South Wales.

The Post Office is the last surviving commercial building in what was once a thriving main street. The building represents the decline of a settlement within the Sydney region.

The place is important in demonstrating the principal characteristics of a class of cultural or natural places/environments in New South Wales.

It is a representative building typifying small village development from the last century and retains elements of its setting and relationship to the former Western Road.
