= St Bartholomew's Anglican Church and Cemetery, Prospect =

St Bartholomew's Anglican Church (former) and Cemetery
- St Bartholomew's Anglican Church (former)
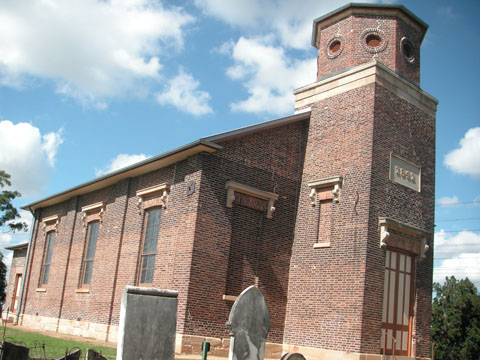
- The former St Bartholomew's Anglican Church, pictured in 2009

- Location in greater metropolitan Sydney
- 33°48′16″S 150°55′03″E
- Location: Ponds Road, Prospect, City of Blacktown, New South Wales
- Country: Australia
- Denomination: Anglican (former)
- Website: stbartholomewsprospect.org/FOSBchurch.html

History
- Status: Church
- Dedication: Saint Bartholomew
- Consecrated: 1841

Architecture
- Functional status: Preserved
- Architect: Henry Robertson
- Architectural type: Church
- Style: Victorian Georgian
- Years built: 1838–1840
- Construction cost: A£1,250
- Closed: 24 December 1967

Specifications
- Materials: Brick; Corrugated iron; Cedar joinery

New South Wales Heritage Register
- Official name: St. Bartholomew's Anglican Church (former) & Cemetery; Bartholomew's Anglican Church & Cemetery; St Bartholomew's Anglican Church
- Type: State heritage (complex / group)
- Designated: 2 April 1999
- Reference no.: 37
- Type: Church
- Category: Religion
- Builders: James Atkinson

St Bartholomew's Anglican Church and Cemetery is a heritage-listed former Anglican church and cemetery at Ponds Road, Prospect, City of Blacktown, New South Wales, Australia. It was designed by Henry Robertson and built from 1838 to 1840 by James Atkinson. It was added to the New South Wales State Heritage Register on 2 April 1999. Since 2000, it has been owned by Blacktown City Council, which had previously leased the site since 1972.

== History ==
=== Aboriginal and European settler history ===
The area of Prospect Reservoir is an area of known Aboriginal occupation, with favourable camping locations along the Eastern Creek and Prospect Creek catchments, and in elevated landscapes to the south. There is also evidence to suggest that the occupation of these lands continued after European contact, through discovery of intermingled glass and stone flakes in archaeological surveys of the place. The area was settled by Europeans by 1789.

Prospect Hill, Sydney's largest body of igneous rock, lies centrally in the Cumberland Plain and dominates the landscape of the area. Very early after first settlement, on 26 April 1788, an exploration party heading west led by Governor Phillip, climbed Prospect Hill. An account by Phillip states that the exploration party saw from Prospect Hill, "for the first time since we landed Carmathen [sic] Hills (Blue Mountains) as likewise the hills to the southward". Phillip's "Bellevue" (Prospect Hill) acquired considerable significance for the new settlers. Prospect Hill provided a point from which distances could be meaningfully calculated, and became a major reference point for other early explorers. When Watkin Tench made another official journey to the west in 1789, he began his journey with reference to Prospect Hill, which commanded a view of the great chain of mountains to the west. A runaway convict, George Bruce, used Prospect Hill as a hideaway from soldiers in the mid-1790s.

During the initial struggling years of European settlement in NSW, Governor Phillip began to settle time-expired convicts on the land as farmers, after the success of James Ruse at Rose Hill. On 18 July 1791 Phillip placed a number of men on the eastern and southern slopes of Prospect Hill, as the soils weathered from the basalt cap were richer than the sandstone derived soils of the Cumberland Plain. The grants, mostly 30 acres, encircled Prospect Hill. The settlers included William Butler, James Castle, Samuel Griffiths, John Herbert, George Lisk, Joseph Morley, John Nicols, William Parish and Edward Pugh.

The arrival of the first settlers prompted the first organised Aboriginal resistance to the spread of settlement, with the commencement of a violent frontier conflict in which Pemulwuy and his Bidjigal clan played a central role. On 1 May 1801 Governor King took drastic action, issuing a public order requiring that Aboriginal people around Parramatta, Prospect Hill and Georges River should be "driven back from the settlers' habitations by firing at them". King's edicts appear to have encouraged a shoot-on-sight attitude whenever any Aboriginal men, women or children appeared.

With the death of Pemulwuy, the main resistance leader, in 1802, Aboriginal resistance gradually diminished near Parramatta, although outer areas were still subject to armed hostilities. Prompted by suggestions to the Reverend Marsden by local Prospect Aboriginal groups that a conference should take place "with a view of opening the way to reconciliation", Marsden promptly organised a meeting near Prospect Hill. At the meeting, held on 3 May 1805, local Aboriginal representatives discussed with Marsden ways of ending the restrictions and indiscriminate reprisals inflicted on them by soldiers and settlers in response to atrocities committed by other Aboriginal clans. The meeting was significant because a group of Aboriginal women and a young free settler at Prospect named John Kennedy acted as intermediaries. The conference led to the end of the conflict for the Aboriginal clans around Parramatta and Prospect. This conference at Prospect on Friday 3 May 1805 is a landmark in Aboriginal/European relations. Macquarie's "Native Feasts" held at Parramatta from 1814 followed the precedent set in 1805. The Sydney Gazette report of the meeting is notable for the absence of the sneering tone that characterised its earlier coverage of Aboriginal matters.

From its commencement in 1791 with the early settlement of the area, agricultural use of the land continued at Prospect Hill. Much of the land appears to have been cleared by the 1820s and pastoral use of the land was well established by then. When Governor Macquarie paid a visit to the area in 1810, he was favourably impressed by the comfortable conditions that had been created.

=== St. Bartholemew's Church ===
Prior to 1836 the building of churches in New South Wales had been a haphazard responsibility of the government. In 1836 the Church Act came into force to promote the building of churches and chapels and provide for the maintenance of Ministers of Religion. The Act immediately led to a spate of church building. St. Bartholemew's Church of England was built by pioneers of Prospect with funds collected from 1837.

In August 1838 tenders were called for the construction of St Bartholomew's Church. The contract was won by James Atkinson of Mulgoa who was building three other churches at the same time: St Peter's at Richmond, St Mary Magdalene at St Mary's and St Thomas' at Mulgoa. His contract was with the trustees, William Lawson, Robert Crawford and Nelson Simmons Lawson. The original contract sum for the building was A£1,250, half of which was borne by private subscription and half by the Colonial Treasury. Henry Robertson is thought to have been the architect for the building although it is highly possible that William Lawson, a surveyor by training, was designer of the church.

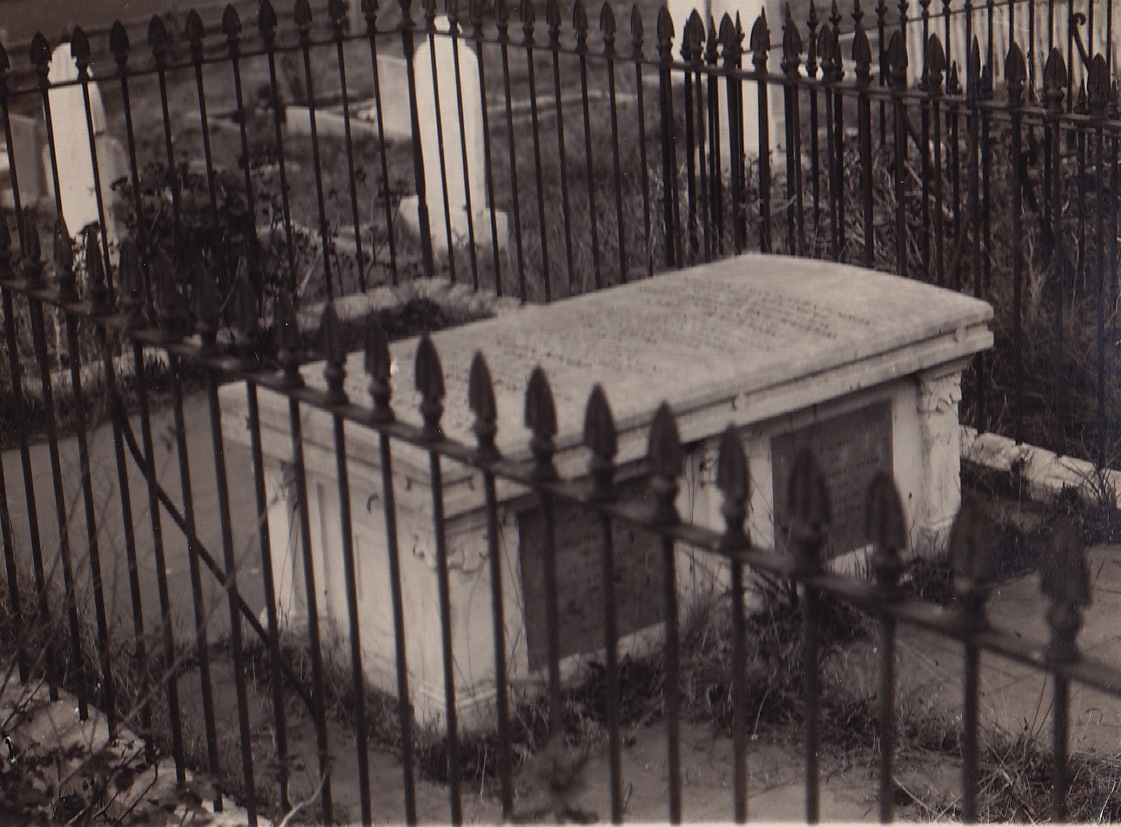
Grave of William Lawson, St Bartholomew's Churchyard

Lawson (1774–1850) who crossed the Blue Mountains with Gregory Blaxland and William Wentworth in 1813, lived in a house in Prospect called Veteran Hall (Lawson was a lieutenant in the NSW Veterans' Company, hence the name). Built in 1810 as a small cottage, it was extended to a forty-room mansion in 1822. Lawson's descendants continued to improve the house until the 1880s. It was demolished in 1926 and its site is now within the Prospect Reservoir grounds. Lawson married Sarah Leadbeater on Norfolk Island while serving there and they had 11 children between 1803 and 1826. William Lawson was buried on 16 June 1850. One of their daughters, Sophia, was born at Prospect, and when she died in 1906, was the last surviving child. The family vault at St. Bartholemew's shelters the remains of several members of this large family.

In April/May 1841 the church and cemetery were consecrated. The earliest burials, on 18 July 1841, were Ann and Margaret Goodin, the 25 and 9 year old daughters of early settlers James and Ann Goodin. The first minutes of the vestry meeting are dated 1842 and refer to the opening of the parish registers by the Rev. H. H. Bobart, who was the rector of St. John's, Parramatta.

By 1891 over 360 burials had been recorded in the Parish Register. From the turn of the century to 1941 there was a substantial increase in the annual number of burials, reflecting the development of the district with the subdivision of farms into suburban allotments, the encroaching metropolitan area and the industrial development with the development of metal quarries, saw mills, brick and tile works and Bonds cotton spinning mills. The sale of burial plots was discontinued in 1992, with burials only taking place in already purchased plots until the expansion of the cemetery in 2023.

The condition of the church deteriorated throughout the mid-twentieth century, and a dwindling congregation and lack of financial support led to its closure in 1967. The last service was held on Christmas Eve that year. A group of citizens interested in preserving the church formed The Prospect Trust in November 1967 under the chairmanship of Robert Brown. In late 1969 the City of Blacktown commenced negotiations with the Church of England Property Trust. A fifty-year lease over most of the property was obtained by Council in 1975.

In 1978 $20,000 was made available from National Estate Funds towards restoration provided the funds be administered by the National Trust of Australia.

In 1982 a Permanent Conservation order was placed on the site. A further $100,000 were allocated for restoration by the Minister for Public Works subject to Blacktown Council meeting this amount on a dollar for dollar basis. Blacktown Council requested the Minister's offer be deferred until Council had negotiated the leasing arrangement into purchase of the building by them or the Department of Environment and Planning.

Fire destroyed much of the contents of the church and severely damaged the roof in November 1989. Parts of the original box pews and joinery, an 1850s organ brought to St Bartholomew's in 1888, a pulpit and lecterns from 1908 and all pressed metal ceilings were lost. In 1991 work commenced to repair the roof and brickwork damaged by the fire. From 2000 to 2001 the Church was completely restored, including interiors and windows with the use of Centenary of Federation funding. The restoration received an EnergyAustralia National Trust Heritage Award in 2004.

In October 2015, the state government gave the City of Blacktown a 52,000-square-metre (560,000 sq ft) parcel of land surrounding the cemetery, allowing the council to proceed with plans to extend the cemetery to meet the needs of the area's growing population. As of June 2018, this has not yet taken place, with the Council continuing to advertise that no new burial licenses can be purchased, with burials only able to take place where rights were purchased prior to 1992.

=== Modifications and dates ===
- 1858 – repairs to ceiling of the church, covering the original plaster ceiling with fabric
- 1880s – stone tablet placed above entrance door bearing the date 1842
- 1887 – church ceiling covered with timber
- c. 1870 – reroofing with corrugated iron
- 1907 – repairs and ceiling covered with pressed metal
- c. 1912 – chancel floor raised by the addition of a new floor over the existing one. Dias added
- 1940s – stone tablet above entrance door altered to read 1841
- c. 1950 – timber roof framing in church reconstructed
- 1950 – metal ceiling refixed after removal of previous ceilings
- 1970 – brick base of hall renewed
- 1977 – doors and Windows removed from church and replaced with 3-millimetre (0.12 in) steel plate
- 1989 – fire destroyed much of the contents of the church and severely damaged the roof
- 1991 – work commenced to repair roof and brickwork damaged by the fire
- ? – security fencing erected around church and inner part of cemetery after the fire
- 2000–2001 – church completely restored with use of Centenary of Federation funding

== Description ==
=== Site ===
St Bartholomew's stands on the hill for which the district is famous – Prospect Hill. It is a conspicuous landmark from which there are fine views from to the Blue Mountains and the City of Sydney. Several mature trees including Mediterranean cypress (Cupressus sempervirens), arborvitae (Thuja species), coral trees (Erythrina species, possibly E.indica), Moreton Bay figs (Ficus macrophylla), gums (Eucalyptus spp.), and bunya pine (Araucaria bidwillii), and African olive (Olea europaea var.africana) clumps are found alongside the fence at either side of the entrance gates to the church. Remnants of early post and rail fencing and entrance gateposts are also found. Lower plantings include variegated century plant (Agave americana Variegata).

The church is surrounded by a graveyard laid out in a grid pattern. It contains sandstone headstones and columns and small headstones in marble and granite, many originally bordered by cast iron surrounds.

=== Church ===
The building is a plain, rectangular brick structure in the Victorian Georgian style, built on an east–west axis comprising nave, chancel and vestries with a tower at the west end. The tower has a square base with an octagonal belfry. The belfry roof timbers carry a timber bell supporting frame although no bell is in place. The roof over the chancel and vestries is separate from the main roof over the nave. The entrance to the building is through the tower. There are also entrances to the vestries from the exterior.

The external walls are modelled by flat pilasters and finely moulded stone entablatures carried on carved stone modillion brackets, rectangular openings and blind windows. The hipped roof, originally shingled, is now clad with corrugated steel.

The interior joinery was finely moulded cedar and the interior walls plastered and painted. Each vestry had a fireplace but the chimneys and mantelpieces have now been removed. The floors are timber. The chancel floor, originally one step above the main floor, has been raised further and a rectangular projecting dais into the main hall added. There is also a small dais in the north western corner of the church on which a font was once placed.

=== Church hall ===
The church hall, relocated from its original location in Wetherill Park in 1908, is a one-storey, rectangular building. The exterior walls are corrugated iron over timber framing and the interior walls are timber boarded. The roof is corrugated steel over timber rafters with metal rods. The hall is on a brick base and may have been a prefabricated building.

=== Condition ===
The physical condition of the site was reported to be good to excellent as at 9 August 2005.

Some elements have been removed for their protection and preservation. There are some problems involved in reinstating them.

== Heritage listing ==
The St Bartholomew's site is closely linked with the development and history of the surrounding area and contains the graves of a considerable number of prominent families from the area since the 1840s. The church is unusually styled for its period and the graveyard is one of the earliest in western Sydney. St. Bartholomew's remains a dominant landmark in the surrounding landscape due to its prominent siting, striking design and mature tree plantings.

St Bartholomew's Anglican Church & Cemetery was listed on the New South Wales State Heritage Register on 2 April 1999 having satisfied the following criteria.

The place is important in demonstrating the course, or pattern, of cultural or natural history in New South Wales.

The cemetery contains the graves of a number of prominent families and individuals from the founders of the community, including the Lawsons of Veteran Hall (Blaxland, Lawson and Wentworth) and the Westons, through to the more recent sporting fame of the Heckenbergs. It demonstrates important family lineages across its entire site from the earliest settlers to their more recent descendants, such as the Leabon and Pond families.

The church is an unusually detailed and planned church. The division of the east end into three separately roofed compartments may be the only extant example in NSW of this design. It therefore occupies a special position in the architectural evolution of churches in NSW.

The church hall provides an element associated with the construction of Prospect Reservoir, a major engineering achievement within the district.

The place is important in demonstrating aesthetic characteristics and/or a high degree of creative or technical achievement in New South Wales.

The site is an important surviving fragment of nineteenth century cultural landscape; an historic icon; a virtual oasis, and de facto public heritage green space, in a once notable rural area now surrounded by the effects of rapid urban, industrial and commercial development. It reflects a visual continuity between 19th and 20th century society. This may be seen not only in the chronological continuity of family burials, but also dramatically in the direct accommodation of power transmission towers, the F4 tollway, the modern Great Western Highway route and the first Great Western Highway route.

The place has a strong or special association with a particular community or cultural group in New South Wales for social, cultural or spiritual reasons.

The church is a building closely linked with the development and early history of the district.

The place has potential to yield information that will contribute to an understanding of the cultural or natural history of New South Wales.

The church is an extant example of an 1840s church, providing evidence of the Church Act.

== See also ==
- List of former churches in Australia
- Australian non-residential architectural styles
