= Prospect, New South Wales =

Prospect
- Suburb
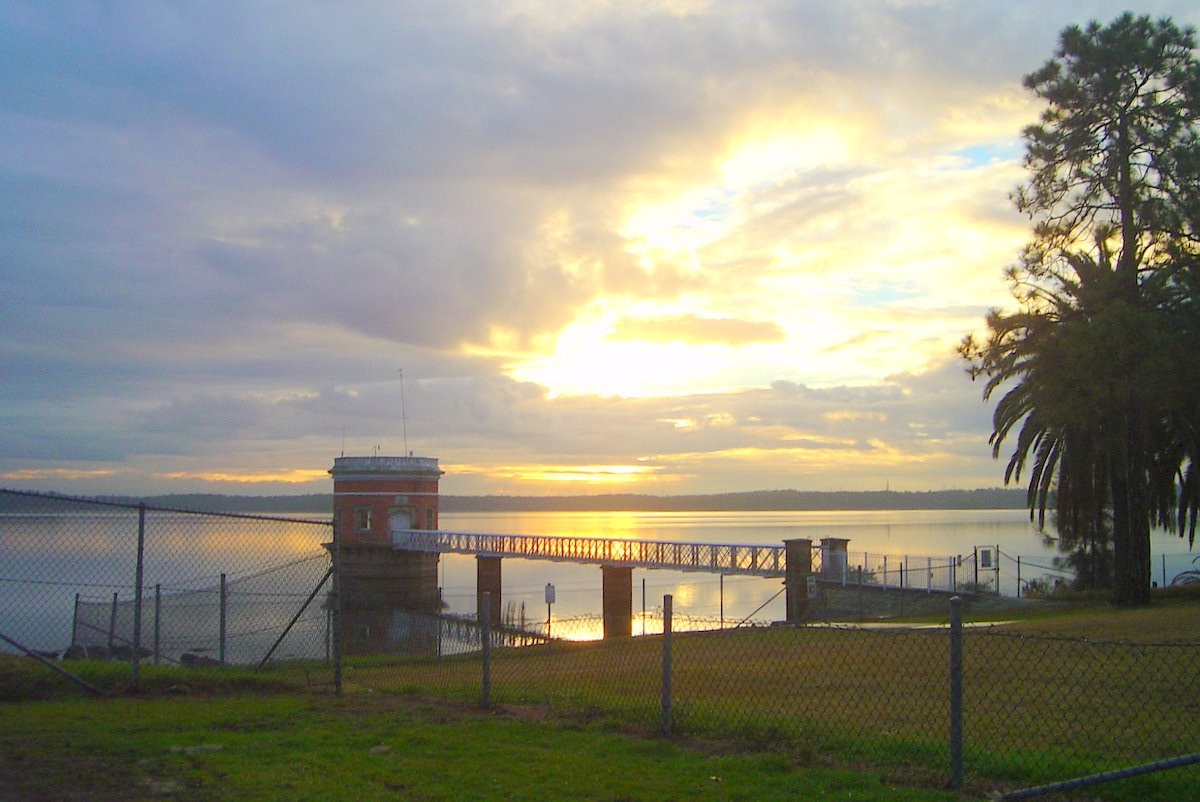
- The Prospect Reservoir at sunset

- Interactive map of Prospect
- Coordinates: 33°47′57″S 150°55′32″E
- Country: Australia
- State: New South Wales
- City: Sydney
- LGAs: City of Blacktown; Cumberland City Council
- Location: 32 km (20 mi) west of Sydney CBD
- Established: 1791

Government
  - State electorate: Prospect
  - Federal division: McMahon
- Elevation: 78 m (256 ft)

Population
  - Total: 5,187 (2021 census)
- Postcode: 2148
- Mean max temp: 23.1 °C (73.6 °F)
- Mean min temp: 12.2 °C (54.0 °F)
- Annual rainfall: 870.6 mm (34.28 in)
Suburbs around Prospect
| Seven Hills | Toongabbie | Girraween |
| Blacktown | Prospect | Pemulwuy |
| Eastern Creek | Wetherill Park | Smithfield |

Prospect is a suburb of Sydney, in the state of New South Wales, Australia. Prospect is located 32 kilometres (20 mi) west of the Sydney central business district in the local government area of the City of Blacktown and a small part of Cumberland City Council, is part of the Greater Western Sydney region. One of the oldest suburbs in Sydney, Prospect takes its name from the prominent nearby landmark of Prospect Hill - from the top of which people could get a prospect of (see a great distance) the surrounding countryside.

Initially a settlement for emancipated convicts, it later became a village. Since colonisation, settlers cleared larger areas of land to raise livestock, and to build churches, inns, schools, shops and a large reservoir. Naturalist Charles Darwin visited Prospect in January 1836, to observe the geology.

== History ==
Prior to the arrival of the First Fleet in 1788, Prospect was inhabited by different groups of the Darug people including the Warmuli. The Aboriginals there were of the woods culture. As European settlement expanded, the aboriginal people's ability to pursue their traditional lifestyle, which was already severely limited, disappeared.

=== European settlement ===
Prospect Hill had been the frontier, which was the first, and perhaps only, area where large scale organised resistance by aboriginal people took place. Lieutenant Watkin Tench most likely named Prospect Hill in April 1790. In July 1791, thirteen grants of land at Prospect were made to emancipated convicts. In January 1794 David Collins reported that the Prospect Hill farmers were the most productive in the colony. Prospect became the boundary between colonists and indigenous Australians. Hostility grew until by 1797, where a state of guerrilla warfare existed between indigenous people and the settler communities at Prospect and Parramatta. The aboriginal people were led by their leader, Pemulwuy, a member of the Bidjigal tribe who occupied the land. Pemulwuy was the main leader of raids against the colony in the 1790s. In 1797 the war escalated; his guerrillas started regular raids on settlements in the Parramatta and Prospect Hill areas. British military expeditions failed to locate and capture Pemulwuy.

Shortly after 1808, William Lawson was appointed aide-de-camp to George Johnston, was granted 500 acres (2.0 km^{2}) at Prospect and built a large house there, which he named Veteran Hall, because he had a commission in the NSW Veterans Company. In the 1880s most of the property was submerged in what is now Prospect Reservoir, although Veteran Hall itself was well above the water level. In 1912 it was used by the army and many of the larger rooms subdivided, giving rise to a myth that it had been a "forty-roomed mansion" in Lawson's time. The house was demolished in 1926.

Nelson Lawson, third son of explorer William Lawson (1774–1850), married Honoria Mary Dickinson and before 1837 built "Greystanes House" as their future family home on the western side of Prospect Hill. Greystanes was approached by a long drive lined with an avenue of English trees – elms (Ulmus procera), hawthorns (Crataegus sp.), holly (Ilex aquifolium), and woodbine (Clematis sp.) mingling with jacarandas (Jacaranda mimosifolia). It had a wide, semi-circular front verandah supported by four pillars. The foundations were of stone, the roof of slate, and the doors and architraves of heavy red cedar. It was richly furnished with articles of the best quality available and was the scene of many glittering soirees attended by the elite of the colony. Honoria Lawson died in 1845, Nelson remarried a year later, but died in 1849, and the property reverted to his father. Greystanes house was demolished in the 1940s.

=== Land development ===
The land was farmed from 1806 to 1888 when the Prospect Reservoir was built. In 1867, the Governor of New South Wales appointed a Commission to recommend a scheme for Sydney's water supply, and by 1869 it was recommended that construction commence on the Upper Nepean Scheme. This consisted of two diversion weirs, located at Pheasant's Nest and Broughton's Pass, in the Upper Nepean River catchment, with water feeding into a series of tunnels, canals and aqueducts known as the Upper Canal. It was intended that water be fed by gravity from the catchment into a reservoir at Prospect. This scheme was to be Sydney's fourth water supply system, following the Tank Stream, Busby's Bore and the Botany (Lachlan) Swamps.

Designed and constructed by the NSW Public Works Department, Prospect Reservoir was built during the 1880s and completed in 1888. Credit for the Upper Nepean Scheme is largely given to Edward Orpen Moriarty, the Engineer in Chief of the Harbours and Rivers Branch of the Public Works Department from 1858 to 1888. By the 1870s, with the collapse of the production of cereal grains across the Cumberland Plain, the Prospect Hill area appears to have largely been devoted to livestock. The dwellings of the earliest settlers largely appear to have been removed by this stage. By the time that any mapping was undertaken in this vicinity, most of these structures had disappeared, making their locations difficult to pinpoint.

=== Contemporary ===
On 30 January 2004 the eastern part of Prospect, which includes the quarry gap, became a new suburb called Pemulwuy after the indigenous leader, containing the new housing estates of Lakeside and Nelson's Ridge and the industrial area within the oval-shaped ridge of Prospect Hill. So most of Prospect Hill is no longer within the suburb of Prospect. Quarrying companies gradually took over more and more of Prospect Hill, mining the dolerite for use as roadstone until it was almost all gone and much of the hill with it. The Prospect quarry, which is now part of Pemulwuy, is formed by an intrusion of dolerite rock into Ashfield Shale. At least seven different rock types occur in the intrusion. The material is predominantly coarse grained picrite with olivine-dolerite and dolerite. Quarrying in the area last occurred in 2007. In the early 2010s, the 330ha quarry gap was transformed into light industry area. Prospect Highway now winds through the gap.

== Geography ==
Philip Gidley King mentions that the landscape of Prospect is "a very pleasant tract of country, which, from the distance the trees grew from each other, and the gentle hills and dales, and rising slopes covered with grass, appeared like a vast park. The soil from Rose Hill to Prospect-Hill is nearly alike, being a loam and clay." The tree cover was mainly the eucalypts, grey box and forest red gum. Spotted gum (Corymbia maculata) is also known to have occurred in the Prospect area.

=== Climate ===
Prospect has a humid subtropical climate (Cfa). Summer weather is warm to hot, and may be humid or dry. Like most of western Sydney, rainfall peaks in late summer to early autumn and more dry conditions occur between late winter and early spring, although rainfall can be erratic. The suburb gets 104.2 clear days annually, with the most sunniest days being in August (13.2) and least in February (5.0 days).

Prospect is usually a few degrees warmer than the Sydney CBD on most spring and summer days. In a few cases there has been a +10-degree differential (this is mostly when northwesterlies bring hot winds from the desert that raise temperatures up to +40 °C (104 °F). However, Prospect is usually a few degrees cooler on most nights of the year, because of its distance from the coast. The highest temperature recorded at Prospect was 45.1 °C (113.2 °F) on 7 January 2018. The lowest temperature recorded was −0.8 °C (30.6 °F) on 30 June 2010. Annually, there are 3.2 days where temperatures go below 2 °C.

Climate data for Prospect Reservoir 1991–2020 averages, 1887–present extremes
| Month | Jan | Feb | Mar | Apr | May | Jun | Jul | Aug | Sep | Oct | Nov | Dec | Year |
|---|---|---|---|---|---|---|---|---|---|---|---|---|---|
| Record high °C (°F) | 47.0 (116.6) | 46.4 (115.5) | 39.5 (103.1) | 37.1 (98.8) | 29.4 (84.9) | 25.6 (78.1) | 26.5 (79.7) | 29.4 (84.9) | 35.0 (95.0) | 39.0 (102.2) | 42.0 (107.6) | 44.4 (111.9) | 47.0 (116.6) |
| Mean daily maximum °C (°F) | 29.3 (84.7) | 28.6 (83.5) | 26.8 (80.2) | 24.1 (75.4) | 20.7 (69.3) | 17.7 (63.9) | 17.2 (63.0) | 19.3 (66.7) | 22.4 (72.3) | 24.8 (76.6) | 26.1 (79.0) | 28.0 (82.4) | 23.8 (74.8) |
| Mean daily minimum °C (°F) | 18.0 (64.4) | 18.0 (64.4) | 16.2 (61.2) | 12.9 (55.2) | 9.7 (49.5) | 6.1 (43.0) | 6.6 (43.9) | 6.6 (43.9) | 9.5 (49.1) | 12.1 (53.8) | 14.5 (58.1) | 16.4 (61.5) | 12.3 (54.1) |
| Record low °C (°F) | 10.0 (50.0) | 10.8 (51.4) | 7.9 (46.2) | 3.6 (38.5) | 1.2 (34.2) | −0.8 (30.6) | −0.6 (30.9) | −0.5 (31.1) | 1.7 (35.1) | 4.5 (40.1) | 6.8 (44.2) | 7.8 (46.0) | −0.8 (30.6) |
| Average precipitation mm (inches) | 96.4 (3.80) | 126.9 (5.00) | 97.4 (3.83) | 67.4 (2.65) | 49.5 (1.95) | 76.1 (3.00) | 40.7 (1.60) | 39.7 (1.56) | 42.2 (1.66) | 55.3 (2.18) | 77.1 (3.04) | 75.5 (2.97) | 845.0 (33.27) |
| Average precipitation days (≥ 1mm) | 8.3 | 8.7 | 9.2 | 6.5 | 5.3 | 7.0 | 5.6 | 4.2 | 5.1 | 6.6 | 8.2 | 8.2 | 82.9 |
| Average afternoon relative humidity (%) | 52 | 54 | 55 | 50 | 57 | 54 | 52 | 43 | 45 | 44 | 51 | 51 | 51 |
Source 1: Prospect Reservoir (1991–2020 averages)
Source 2: Prospect Reservoir (1965–2018 extremes) Horsley Park (1997–present extremes)

== Landmarks ==
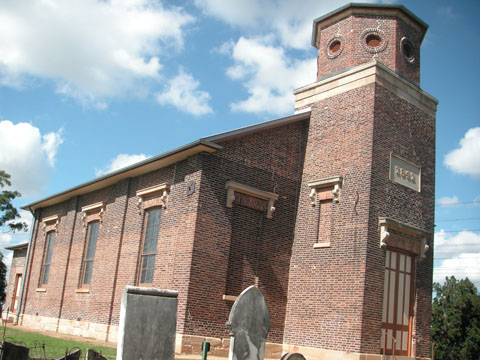
St Bartholomew's

- Prospect Hill, Pemulwuy, is visible from many locations. It is a noticeable landmark of historical importance in the early settlement history of New South Wales, and the suburb of Prospect takes its name from the hill. The hill is also the site of Prospect dolerite intrusion, which was composed mainly of dolerite that intruded into the Sydney Basin rocks during the Jurassic period (although most of the dolerite has been quarried away).
- Prospect Reservoir in Prospect Nature Reserve, located within the Western Sydney Parklands, is a water storage reservoir located at the headwaters of Prospect Creek. Surrounding the Reservoir, there are recreational picnic areas, playgrounds, public parking and shelters.
- St Bartholomew's Church of England is a brick church with a cemetery that contains the tomb of Lieutenant William Lawson and the graves of several pioneering families. It is listed on the Register of the National Estate.
- Sydney Action Park, a large water park, is located in Prospect. It was opened on 12 December 2013, formerly known as Wet'n'Wild
- Hylands Inn - Located at Hylands Road, in the 1880s, this later became the family home and dairy farm of Luke Hyland. Was a Cobb & Co stop. Horses were rested in the paddocks at the rear. The Coach travelled from Sydney to Hylands Inn for the overnight stop, then on to Penrith, then over the Blue Mountains. Holroyd Youth Services leases a building as a youth centre. This was one of five hotels operating during the construction of the Reservoir. Others were The Fox under the Hill, The Prospect Inn and Buckett’s Hotel.
- Royal Cricketers Arms - Built in 1877, the hotel is one of the few remaining roadside inns that were on The Great Western Highway between Sydney and Bathurst, as well as being one of the last remaining buildings (along with the former village Post Office) of the Prospect Village. The Royal Cricketers Arms building is of Victorian and Georgian design, being a two-storey brick and timber building set on a random rubble foundation stone wall on a sloping site.

== Heritage listings ==
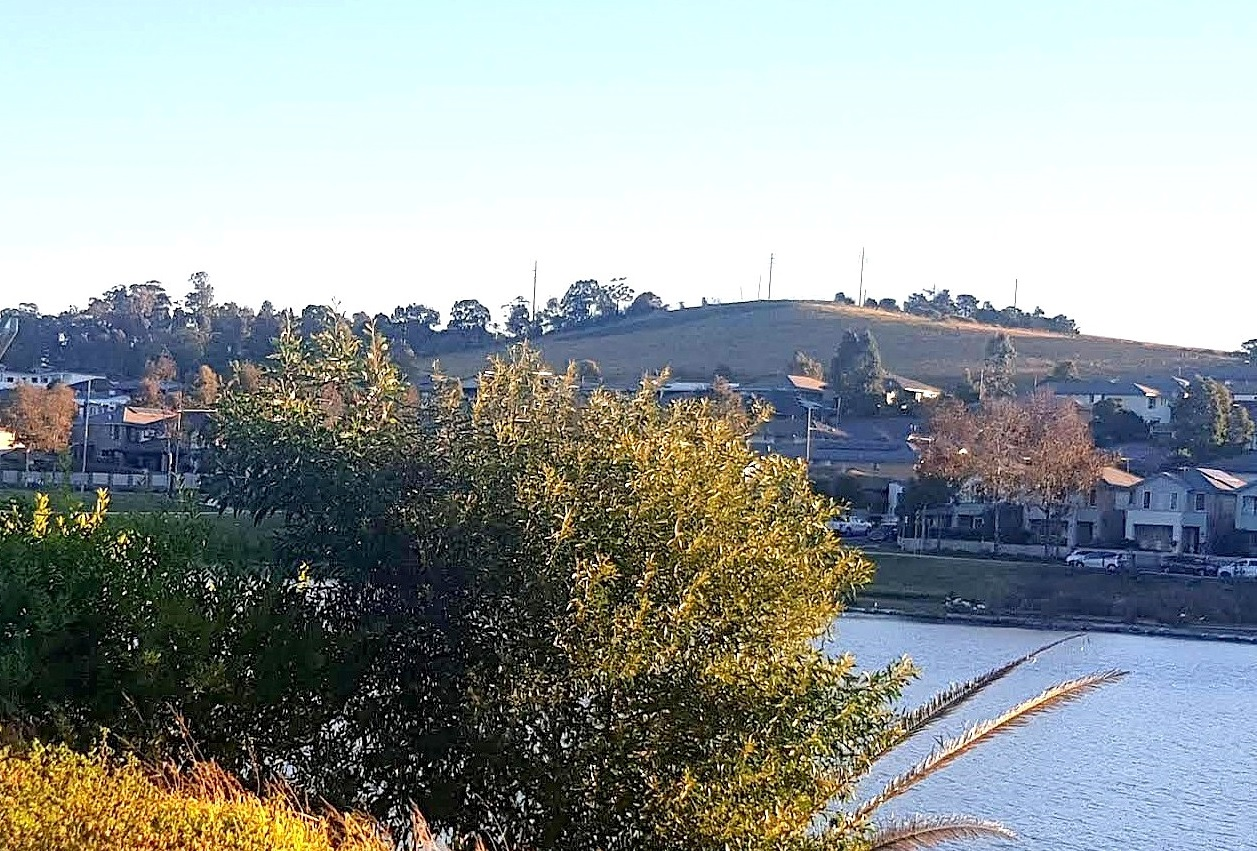
Prospect Hill, as viewed from Pemulwuy Lake

Prospect has a number of heritage-listed sites, including:

- Upper Canal System
- Great Western Highway: Veteran Hall Remains
- Ponds Road: St Bartholomew's Anglican Church and Cemetery
- Reservoir Road: Former Great Western Road Alignment, Prospect
- Reservoir Road: Prospect Reservoir
- East of Reservoir: Prospect Reservoir Valve House
- 385 Reservoir Road: Royal Cricketers Arms Inn
- 23 Tarlington Place: Prospect Post Office
- Clunies Ross Street: Prospect Hill
- Reservoir Road: Prospect Hill Reservoir

== Transport ==
Prospect is adjacent to the Great Western Highway and the M4 Motorway, providing road access to the western sections of the city and eastward to the Sydney CBD.

The Prospect Highway links Prospect to central Blacktown.

Blacktown railway station provides access to the Sydney Trains and NSW TrainLink networks, especially Sydney Trains' North Shore & Western Line. Several bus companies offer connecting services between Prospect and Blacktown, via Blacktown Road.

== Demographics ==
Ancestry

According to the 2021 census, the most common ancestries in Prospect were Australian 19.6%, English 16.4%, Indian 10.3%, Chinese 5.7% and Maltese 5.7%.

According to the 2016 census, the most common ancestries in Prospect were English 15.8%, Australian 15.7%, Indian 6.4%, Maltese 5.3% and Irish 4.8%.

Country of birth

53.7% of people were born in Australia. The other most common countries of birth were India 7.4%, Philippines 3.3%, Fiji 2.9%, Sri Lanka 2.3% and New Zealand 1.9%. 23.9% of people had both parents born in Australia and 62.2% of people had both parents born overseas.

According to the 2016 census, 56.4% of people were born in Australia. The most common countries of birth were India 4.6%, Philippines 3.1%, Fiji 3.0%, Malta 2.1% and Sri Lanka 2.0%.

Language

50.9% of people only spoke English at home. Other languages spoken at home included Arabic 5.7%, Hindi 3.5%, Tamil 3.2%, Gujarati 2.7% and Punjabi 2.6%.

Religion

The most common responses for religion in Prospect were Catholic 31.1%, No Religion 14.8%, Hinduism 12.3%, Islam 7.0% and Anglican 6.8%.

== Notable residents ==
Notable people who have resided in the suburb include:

- Pemulwuy - a member of the Bidjigal tribe, was the main leader of raids by aboriginal people against the colony of New South Wales in the 1790s. In 1797 the war escalated; his guerrillas started regular raids on settlements in the Parramatta and Prospect Hill areas.
- William Lawson - who with Gregory Blaxland and William Charles Wentworth, explored a route across the Blue Mountains. He was granted 500 acres (2.0 km^{2}) at Prospect and built a large house there in the 1820s, which he named Veteran Hall.
- Natasha Crofts - Australian Mother of the Year in 2007
