= William Lawson (explorer) =

English born Australian explorer and politician (1774–1850)

The Honourable William Lawson
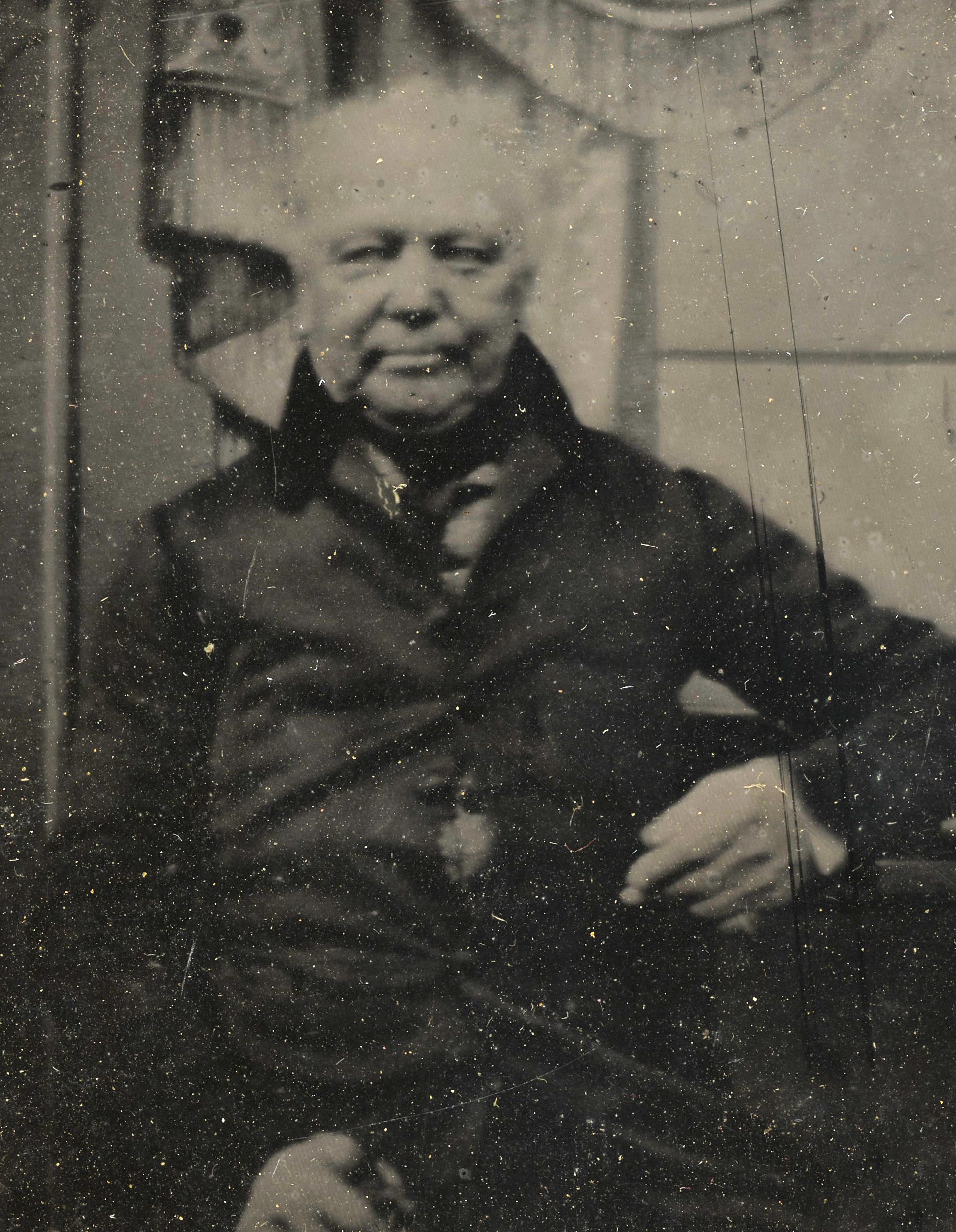
- Portrait of William Lawson, c. 1846

Member of Legislative Council of New South Wales
- In office 11 July 1843 – 20 June 1848

Personal details
- Born: 2 June 1774 Finchley, Middlesex, England
- Died: 16 June 1850 (aged 76) Prospect, Colony of New South Wales, Australia
- Resting place: St Barts, Prospect
- Citizenship: British Empire
- Relatives: Nelson Lawson (son); Street family
- Known for: 1813 crossing of the Blue Mountains

Military service
- Allegiance: British Army
- Branch/service: New South Wales Corps
- Rank: Commandant

William Lawson, MLC (2 June 1774 – 16 June 1850) was a British soldier, explorer, land owner, grazier and politician. In 1800, he migrated to Sydney, New South Wales, and from 1819, he served as the commandant of the Bathurst, New South Wales region, and from 1843, he served as a member of the New South Wales Parliament.

In 1813, Lawson pioneered the first successful crossing of the Blue Mountains by British colonists, along with Gregory Blaxland and William Wentworth, and they discovered inland pastures that fuelled the colony's economic growth thereafter.

== Early years ==
Lawson was born in Finchley, Middlesex, England. He was the son of John Lawson and his second wife Hannah Summers. His father owned a successful chandler business, and he was a descendant of the Scottish Lawson family of Cairnmuir House in the Pentland Hills of Edinburgh, Scotland.

Lawson was educated in London and trained as a surveyor. He decided to join the British Army and purchased a commission in the New South Wales Corps as an ensign for £300 in 1799. He received orders to transfer to Sydney, arriving there in November 1800.

== Officer in the 'Rum Corps' ==
=== Norfolk Island ===
Shortly after his arrival in Sydney he was posted to work at the penal colony at Norfolk Island under Major Joseph Foveaux. At this time, a planned insurgency of Irish convicts and soldiers on the island was discovered with Foveaux hanging two alleged ring-leaders without trial and punishing others with 500 lashes. Lawson became trusted by Foveaux and was appointed to adjudicate in the island's military court. This court was accused of corrupt practices and in one high profile case which Lawson helped preside over, an appointee to a government position who Foveaux did not like was found guilty of incest.

In addition to his military duties on Norfolk Island, Lawson also acquired land and raised sheep. He also obtained a convict mistress named Sarah Leadbeater, who had been sentenced to 7 years transportation for stealing clothes. He developed a long term relationship with Sarah, eventually marrying her in 1812 and having eleven children with her.

=== Involvement in the Rum Rebellion ===
In 1806, Lawson returned to Sydney and was promoted to the rank of lieutenant in the New South Wales Corps. Here he became a close associate with the leading officers including Captain John Macarthur and Lieutenant-Colonel George Johnston. These officers controlled a very profitable monopoly in the colony that centred on the trading on rum, and the New South Wales Corps was called the 'Rum Corps' as a result of this corrupt racketeering. Lawson became an integral part of this clique.

In January 1808, when Governor Bligh had John Macarthur arrested on charges of sedition against the colonial government, Lawson was one of six officers appointed to help oversee his trial. Colluding with Macarthur, Lawson and the other officers refused to acknowledge the legitimacy of the presiding judge, took possession of the court documents and removed Macarthur from the custody of the court. When Bligh ordered Lawson and the other officers to halt their interference in the trial, they refused, resulting in Bligh charging them with treason. Macarthur, Johnston, Lawson and the other officers and soldiers of the 'Rum Corps' then proceeded to collaborate in a full armed mutiny against Governor Bligh known as the Rum Rebellion. This military coup resulted in the detainment and removal of Bligh from power, and the installation of a military junta headed by Macarthur and Johnston.

For his assistance in the rebellion, Lawson was given the role of Johnston's aide-de-camp and received a 500-acre land grant at Prospect.

=== Commandant of the Newcastle convict colony ===
In 1809, Lawson was appointed by the rebel administration as Commandant of the Newcastle (Coal River) penal settlement at the mouth of the Hunter River. He had previously held the position of acting commandant there during a brief period 1807.

At Newcastle, Lawson was in charge of several high profile political prisoners who had been arrested and transported to the penal settlement for being supporters of Bligh. These included Henry Browne Hayes, a wealthy emancipist who owned the Vaucluse estate east of Sydney, and George Crossley, who was Bligh's principal legal advisor. Lawson ensured that these prisoners, which he called "Bligh's mob", were worked as hard as the ordinary convicts digging coal and collecting shell.

When Hayes was transferred to house-arrest at Vaucluse for health reasons, Lawson had him violently re-arrested and ordered the ransacking of his house for not meeting the conditions of his parole. Hayes was sent back to Newcastle and Lawson published a notice threatening 200 lashes to anyone who assisted Hayes.

=== Removal from office and sent to England ===
With the arrival of Governor Lachlan Macquarie in late 1809, the rebel administration of Macarthur and Johnston was dissolved. Macquarie ordered Lawson to release the political prisoners at Newcastle that supported Bligh, and on 10 January 1810 Lawson was replaced as Commandant by Lieutenant John Purcell.

Upon his release, George Crossley took civil legal action against Lawson and several other 'Rum Corps' officers for false imprisonment. At a trial in April 1810, Lawson was found guilty of wrongfully imprisoning Crossley and was ordered to contribute to costs and a payment of £500 (reduced to £300 on appeal) to Crossley.

Macquarie then had Lawson sent to England to act as a witness in the court-martial against Johnston for his leading role in the mutiny and treason against Governor Bligh. Lawson remained in England until 1812.

== Expedition crossing the Blue Mountains ==
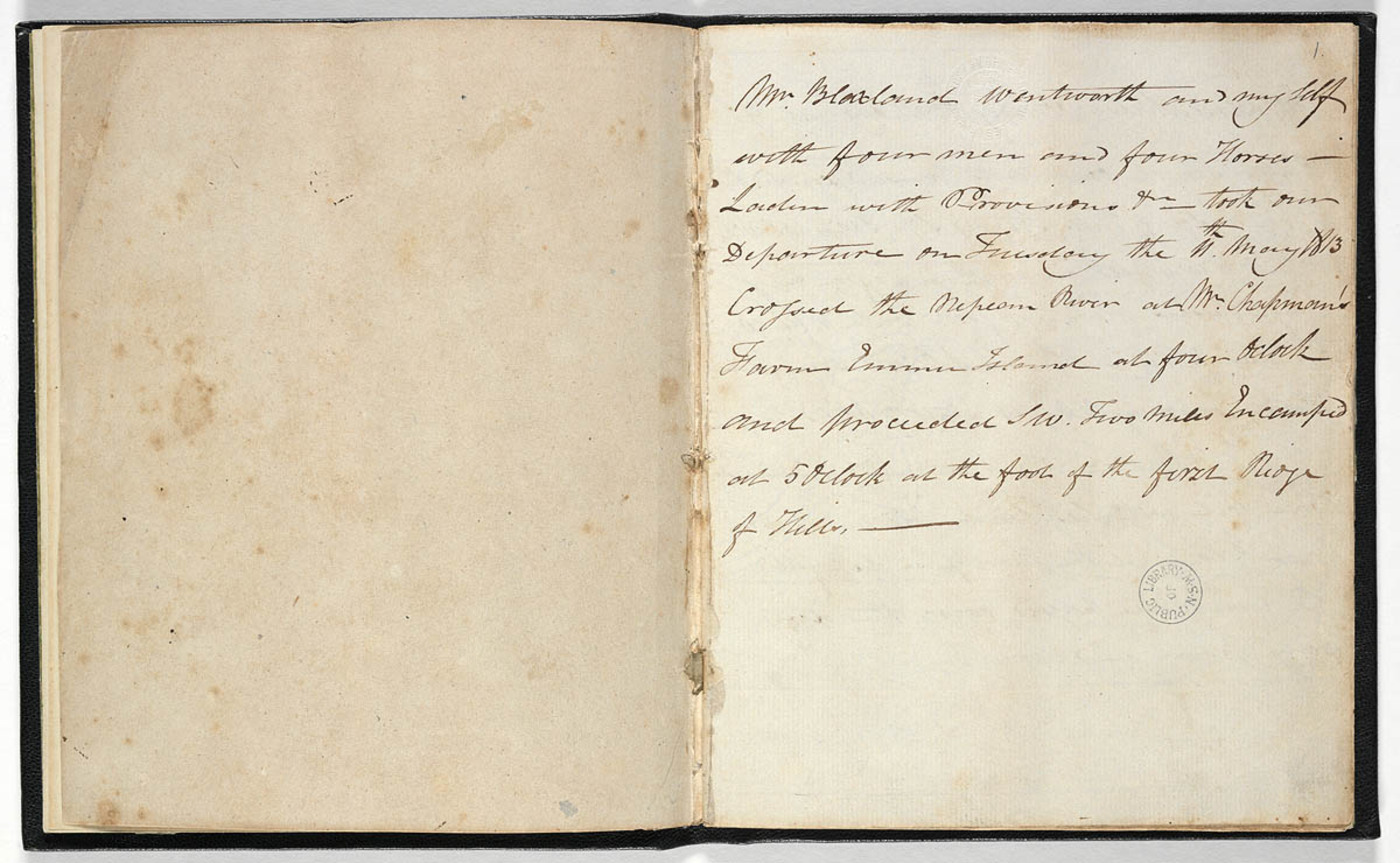
William Lawson – Journal of an expedition across the Blue Mountains.

Lawson returned to Sydney in 1812 as a lieutenant in the NSW Veteran's Company and was placed in charge of the detachment stationed at Liverpool. He started work on building a mansion at his land grant in Prospect which was eventually completed in 1821 and which he named Veteran Hall after his commanding role in the Veteran's Company. Lawson also took interest in becoming a wool-producer and became active in exploring for land to acquire for sheep farming.

Lawson commenced the exploration of the Blue Mountains alongside Blaxland and William Charles Wentworth on 11 May 1813. He kept a journal of the expedition titled, 'W. Lawson's Narrative. Across Blue Mountains [sic]'. In his first entry he writes:

Mr. Blaxland Wentworth and myself with four men and four Horses- Laden with Provisions etc- took our Departure on Tuesday the 11th May 1813. Crossed the Nepean River at Mr. Chapman's Farm Emu Island at four o'clock and proceeded SW. Two miles. Encamped at 5 o'clock at the foot of the first Ridge of Hills-.

On 31 May 1813, the party reached the most westerly point of their expedition, recorded as Mount Blaxland, and looked out onto what was to become known as the Bathurst Plains. On this day, Lawson writes:

...this Country will I have no doubt be a great acquisition to this Colony and no difficulty in making a good Road to it, and take it in a Political point of View if in case of our Invasion it will be a safe Retreat for the Inhabitance with their Familys and that for this part of the Country is so formed by Nature that a few men would be able to defend the passes against a large body.

== First British pastoralist west of the Blue Mountains ==
In February 1814, Governor Macquarie offered land grants of 1,000 acres to each of the three explorers for their work. The grants were to be allocated in the Bathurst Plains region that they had journeyed to. In 1815, Lawson accepted the offer and took 100 head of cattle across the Blue Mountains and established his property on the south side of the Fish River, near to its junction with the Macquarie River. By doing so, Lawson became the first British pastoralist west of the mountains. He named the property Macquarie.

== Commandant of the Bathurst region ==
By 1819 Lawson was the most prominent stock-owner and land-holder in the newly colonised region westward of the mountains. Only a handful of other colonists had been allowed to take up land in this area around the government outpost of Bathurst. In that same year, Charles Throsby guided by local Aboriginal men had formed an easier trail to Bathurst from Sydney that approached from the south. Governor Macquarie recognised that more settlers would now travel to the region to take up land and a more formal administration would be required at Bathurst. He consequently made Lawson, who was still a lieutenant in the army, commandant for the Bathurst region in September 1819.

With the British increasingly taking land in the area, violence with the local resident Wiradjuri people became apparent. In 1819, four Aboriginal people were shot dead in the vicinity of Lawson's property, while one of Lawson's horses was speared. As commandant, Lawson was in command of all the troops stationed west of the Blue Mountains, but it appears these soldiers were not utilised at this stage of the conflict.

== Pioneer colonist of the Mudgee region ==
Whilst Commandant of Bathurst, Lawson undertook four expeditions in 1821 and 1822 to find good pasture land to the north of this outpost. Following information from James Blackman and being guided by a local Aboriginal man named Ering (Aaron), Lawson became one of the first white men to travel along the Cudgegong and Talbragar Rivers. He met with around 40 Aboriginal people gathered at Mudgee, writing that the area was some of the finest grazing land in the world. He also named the nearby Goulburn River.

Lawson later took up 5,000 acres of land to the northwest of Mudgee and formed another large property on the Talbragar River.

== Bathurst War ==
As the British expanded their taking of land, conflict with the local Aboriginal population continued. Near Mudgee in 1822, George Cox led a fight resulting in around six Aborigines being shot. One of Lawson's own stockmen was also killed at Dirty Swamp in the same year, but Lawson chose not to mobilise the military. However in 1823, after an Aboriginal raiding group led by a man named 'Jingler' got hold of muskets and ammunition and successfully stalled British expansion, Lawson decided to order the formation of a patrol composed of armed settlers and four soldiers of the 40th Regiment. He also placed soldiers at the properties of the most regarded colonists.

Lawson still took a conciliatory stance with the Aboriginal population and appears to have had good relations with at least one local clan. However, with the escalation of violence, the authorities decided in late 1823 to replace Lawson as Commandant of Bathurst with a veteran of the Peninsula War in Major James Morisset.

In mid 1824, conflict with the Wiradjuri soared, around a hundred Aboriginal people including women and children had been murdered, while twenty-two whites had been killed. Lawson's properties in the region had been attacked, hundreds of his sheep destroyed and another four of his employees were dead. His son, William Lawson Jnr, admitted the situation had become a war and wished that the Wiradjuri could be exterminated. This war has become known as the Bathurst War.

In July 1824, Lawson with 12 other major colonists around Bathurst signed a petition requesting a large military force to be sent out to subjugate the "natives". In August, Governor Thomas Brisbane obliged the settlers by announcing martial law in the Bathurst region and ordered Commandant Morisset to implement measures to control the situation. In September, Morisset organised a large military punitive expedition containing soldiers of the 40th Regiment and armed settlers, to sweep the area around Bathurst and Mudgee. Lawson provided the horses for the group and commanded one of the four divisions within the expedition. Officially there was no death toll recorded from this military campaign, but witness reports from the time and oral evidence indicate that multiple massacres of Aboriginal people were carried out. The Bathurst War ended later in 1824 with martial law being revoked and Wiradjuri leader Windradyne suing for peace.

== Squatting ==
After the Bathurst War, Lawson retired from the British Army and became focused on acquiring land. Throughout the 1820s and 1830s he obtained further large parcels of land especially along the Coolaburragundy River and at Kurrajong. By the 1840s, he had become one of the largest landholders in the colony, a powerful squatter with 150,000 acres, 84,000 sheep and 15,000 cattle to his name. He became an importer of thoroughbred horses and an important identity in the horse-racing and fox hunting industries.

He completed his mansion, Veteran Hall, at Prospect, but was still very active in the running of his properties out west. Conflict between Lawson's employees and Aboriginal people during the process of taking this land was at times reported, with serious violence occurring during the seizure of land along the Barwon River.

His sons, William Junior and Nelson, also became extensive landholders. The Lawson family consolidated their squatting with the marrying of William Junior to Caroline Icely, the sister of wealthy squatter Thomas Icely.

The wealth Lawson obtained from the pastoral industry was built upon the utilisation of cheap convict labour. Convicts were assigned to Lawson as virtual slave labour, those that absconded were sometimes punished with 100 lashes before being returned to his properties. With the end of transportation of convicts to New South Wales in the 1840s, Lawson strongly advocated for the importation of cheap foreign coolie labour. In 1841 he obtained labourers from Chile but was prohibited from bringing "hill coolies" from India. Lawson also chaired meetings in support of the resumption of convict transportation and also employed imported Chinese coolies, who absconded due to poor rations and underpayment.

== Political career ==
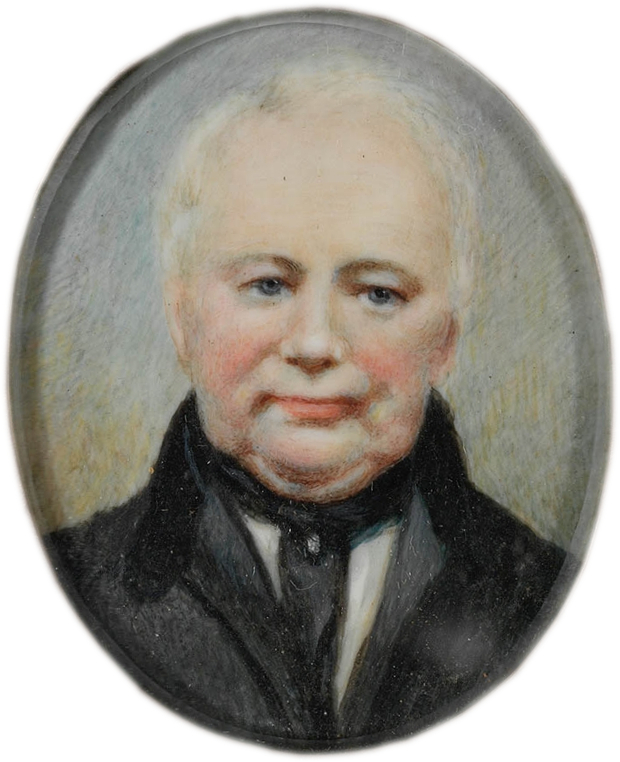
Portrait of William Lawson, ca. 1845, watercolour on ivory miniature

Lawson had become one of the highest-profile colonists and in 1843 he chose to enter politics, and he was elected to the New South Wales Legislative Council as the member for the County of Cumberland. He remained a member of parliament until 1848, rarely contributing to discussion but often voting in the interests of squatters.

He died at his estate, Veteran Hall in Prospect on 16 June 1850 and was buried at St Bartholomew's cemetery.

== Legacy ==
The town of Lawson in the Blue Mountains is named after him.

His son Nelson Lawson succeeded him in his seat in the New South Wales Legislative Council. His granddaughter Susanna married Australian politician John Rendell Street, who was the patriarch of the Street family.

In 1963, Lawson was honoured, together with Blaxland and Wentworth, on a postage stamp issued by Australia Post depicting the Blue Mountains crossing.

== Additional resources ==
- Historical Records of New South Wales, vols 4–7
- Historical Records of Australia, Series I, vols 3–8, 10, 11, 13, 14, 16
- H. Selkirk, ‘Discovery of Mudgee’, Journal of the Royal Australian Historical Society, 8 (1922)
- C. H. Bertie, ‘The Lawsons’, Home (Sydney), 1 January 1932
- E. C. Lawson, Lawson of Veteran Hall (microfilm, State Library of New South Wales)
- "William Lawson, Explorer And The First Of Our Squatters". The Farmer & Settler. Vol. L, no. 12. New South Wales, Australia. 10 December 1954. p. 17 – via Trove.
- Bonwick transcripts, biography, vol 3 (State Library of New South Wales).

New South Wales Legislative Council
New creation	Member for County of Cumberland; Jul 1843 – Jun 1848; With: Charles Cowper	Succeeded by Nelson Lawson
