= Veteran Hall Remains =

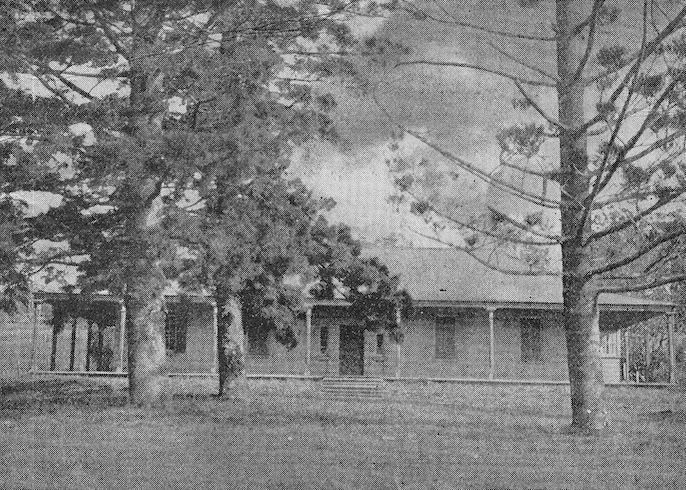
- Veteran Hall, 1913

- Location within New South Wales Location within Australia
- 33.8109°S 150.9165°E
- Location: Great Western Highway, Prospect, City of Blacktown, New South Wales, Australia

History
- Built: 1821–1821

Site notes
- Owner: Sydney Water

New South Wales Heritage Register
- Official name: Veteran Hall - House Remains
- Type: state heritage (archaeological-terrestrial)
- Designated: 18 November 1999
- Reference no.: 1351
- Type: Homestead Complex
- Category: Farming and Grazing
- Builders: William Lawson

The Veteran Hall Remains are the heritage-listed archaeological remains of the former Veteran Hall house at Great Western Highway, Prospect, City of Blacktown, New South Wales, Australia. Veteran Hall was built in 1821 by William Lawson. The property is owned by Sydney Water. It was added to the New South Wales State Heritage Register on 18 November 1999.

== History ==
=== Aboriginal and European settler history ===
The area of Prospect Reservoir is an area of known Aboriginal occupation, with favourable camping locations along the Eastern Creek and Prospect Creek catchments, and in elevated landscapes to the south. There is also evidence to suggest that the occupation of these lands continued after European contact, through discovery of intermingled glass and stone flakes in archaeological surveys of the place. The area was settled by Europeans by 1789.

Prospect Hill, Sydney's largest body of igneous rock, lies centrally in the Cumberland Plain and dominates the landscape of the area. Very early after first settlement, on 26 April 1788, an exploration party heading west led by Governor Phillip, climbed Prospect Hill. An account by Phillip states that the exploration party saw from Prospect Hill, "for the first time since we landed Carmathen [sic] Hills (Blue Mountains) as likewise the hills to the southward". Phillip's "Bellevue" (Prospect Hill) acquired considerable significance for the new settlers. Prospect Hill provided a point from which distances could be meaningfully calculated, and became a major reference point for other early explorers. When Watkin Tench made another official journey to the west in 1789, he began his journey with reference to Prospect Hill, which commanded a view of the great chain of mountains to the west. A runaway convict, George Bruce, used Prospect Hill as a hideaway from soldiers in the mid-1790s.

During the initial struggling years of European settlement in NSW, Governor Phillip began to settle time-expired convicts on the land as farmers, after the success of James Ruse at Rose Hill. On 18 July 1791 Phillip placed a number of men on the eastern and southern slopes of Prospect Hill, as the soils weathered from the basalt cap were richer than the sandstone derived soils of the Cumberland Plain. The grants, mostly 30 acres, encircled Prospect Hill. The settlers included William Butler, James Castle, Samuel Griffiths, John Herbert, George Lisk, Joseph Morley, John Nicols, William Parish and Edward Pugh.

The arrival of the first settlers prompted the first organised Aboriginal resistance to the spread of settlement, with the commencement of a violent frontier conflict in which Pemulwuy and his Bidjigal clan played a central role. On 1 May 1801 Governor King took drastic action, issuing a public order requiring that Aboriginal people around Parramatta, Prospect Hill and Georges River should be "driven back from the settlers" habitations by firing at them'. King's edicts appear to have encouraged a shoot-on-sight attitude whenever any Aboriginal men, women or children appeared.

With the death of Pemulwuy, the main resistance leader, in 1802, Aboriginal resistance gradually diminished near Parramatta, although outer areas were still subject to armed hostilities. Prompted by suggestions to the Reverend Marsden by local Prospect Aboriginal groups that a conference should take place "with a view of opening the way to reconciliation", Marsden promptly organised a meeting near Prospect Hill. At the meeting, held on 3 May 1805, local Aboriginal representatives discussed with Marsden ways of ending the restrictions and indiscriminate reprisals inflicted on them by soldiers and settlers in response to atrocities committed by other Aboriginal clans. The meeting was significant because a group of Aboriginal women and a young free settler at Prospect named John Kennedy acted as intermediaries. The conference led to the end of the conflict for the Aboriginal clans around Parramatta and Prospect. This conference at Prospect on Friday 3 May 1805 is a landmark in Aboriginal/European relations. Macquarie's "Native Feasts" held at Parramatta from 1814 followed the precedent set in 1805. The Sydney Gazette report of the meeting is notable for the absence of the sneering tone that characterised its earlier coverage of Aboriginal matters.

From its commencement in 1791 with the early settlement of the area, agricultural use of the land continued at Prospect Hill. Much of the land appears to have been cleared by the 1820s and pastoral use of the land was well established by then. When Governor Macquarie paid a visit to the area in 1810, he was favourably impressed by the comfortable conditions that had been created.

=== Veteran Hall: Home of William Lawson ===
The explorer William Lawson (1774-1850) was granted 500 acres on the western slopes of the west ridge of Prospect Hill in 1810. The grant was made by the illegal government that followed the overthrow of Governor Bligh in 1808, but was later confirmed by Governor Macquarie. Lawson erected Veteran Hall in about 1821, so named because he had a commission in the NSW Veterans Company. It either replaced or was an enlargement of Lawson's first house, which was built on the same site around 1810. It was a large, single-storey building in typical Colonial Georgian style, approximately 65 squares in size, which expanded to a size of approximately 110 squares including verandahs. Veteran Hall and the original house that it replaced were owned and occupied by William Lawson between 1810 and 1850.

The property was resumed during the 1880s for the construction of Prospect Reservoir, and Veteran Hall became the residence and local office of the Water Board's Engineer-In-Charge of Headworks, Albert Francis Jacob (a son of New South Wales politician Archibald Jacob), from 1888 until 1912, when the position was moved to Potts Hill. The homestead was then leased with the surrounding paddocks to the Commonwealth military authorities until 1915 as a remount depot. The building then became vacant and was demolished in 1929. Several of the decorative fittings and architectural details, such as the quoins, were donated to the Vaucluse House Trust and some of Lawson's descendants. William Lawson, a key figure in Australian history, died at Veteran Hall in 1850, and was buried at nearby St.Bartholomew's Church. The foundations of Veteran Hall are still visible just off William Lawson Drive, Prospect.

=== Grey Stanes: Home of Nelson Lawson ===
Nelson Lawson, third son of explorer William Lawson (1774-1850), married Honoria Mary Dickinson and in 1837 built Grey Stanes as their future family home on the crest of the eastern ridge of Prospect Hill. William Lawson had purchased the 75 acre grant from William Cummings at about the same time, in 1810, as he was granted 500 acres on the western slopes of the west ridge of Prospect Hill. Cummings, an ensign of the New South Wales Corps, had been granted the land in 1799. In 1836 William Lawson transferred the 75 acre grant to his third son, Nelson Simmonds Lawson.

Grey Stanes was built on the original crest of the east ridge of Prospect Hill which has now been quarried away. The site is in the suburb of Pemulwuy. It is close to the present One Tree Hill, the "one tree" being a Moreton Bay fig tree, which still survives, having been planted in the paddock or garden of Grey Stanes.

Grey Stanes was approached by a long drive lined with an avenue of English trees - elms (Ulmus procera), hawthorns (Crataegus sp.), holly (Ilex aquifolium), and woodbine (Clematis sp.) mingling with jacarandas (Jacaranda mimosifolia). It had a wide, semi-circular front verandah supported by four pillars. The foundations were of stone, the roof of slate, and the doors and architraves of heavy red cedar. It was richly furnished with articles of the best quality available and was the scene of many glittering soirées attended by the elite of the colony. Honoria Lawson died in 1845, Nelson remarried a year later, but died in 1849 and the property reverted to his father. Grey Stanes was demolished in the 1940s.

=== Modifications and dates ===
- c. 1810 Macquarie confirmed grant to William Lawson (500 acres), WL built Veteran Hall
- c. 1821 main Veteran Hall homestead either replacing or enlarging original c.1810 house - a large, single-storey building in typical Colonial Georgian style, approximately 65 squares in size, which expanded to a size of approximately 110 squares including verandahs. It was owned and occupied by William between 1810 and 1850
- pre 1837 Nelson Lawson built Grey Stanes on the crest of the eastern ridge of Prospect Hill. It had a wide, semi-circular front verandah supported by four pillars. The foundations were of stone, the roof of slate, and the doors and architraves of heavy red cedar.
- 1880s Veteran Hall property resumed for construction of Prospect Reservoir
- 1888-1912 Veteran Hall homestead became the residence and local office of the Water Board's Engineer-In-Charge of Headworks
- 1912-15 Veteran Hall homestead leased with surrounding paddocks to the Commonwealth military authorities as a remount depot. The building then became vacant
- 1929 Veteran Hall homestead demolished. Several of the decorative fittings and architectural details, such as quoins, were donated to the Vaucluse House Trust and some of Lawson's descendants.
- 1940s Grey Stanes was demolished.

== Description ==
The homestead site is marked by wall footings and scattered sandstock bricks. An avenue of mature Araucaria cunninghamii (hoop pines) and Araucaria bidwillii (bunya pines) leads to the house site.

Other established plantings in the vicinity include wild or African olive (Olea europaea var.cuspidata), and a former Pyracantha (firethorn) hedge. A Macartney rose (Rosa bracteata) is in the homestead garden. The same species of rose is also found in the King family farm garden at St. Marys.

Ancillary elements associated with the house site include cellars (filled) and a well discovered near the Prospect Hill Reservoir access road.

A memorial cairn constructed of bricks from the house and erected in 1970, and several explanatory signs attached to an old style timber post and rail fence now also indicate the presence of the house site. The bronze plaque provided by the Macquarie Historical Society reads as follows, "This cairn marks the site of Veteran Hall, the home of explorer William Lawson and commemorates his life and achievements. Erected 1970". Recent works near the access road to Prospect Hill reservoir have uncovered a 25.5 metre well approximately 182 metres from the site of Veteran Hall. It is 2 metres across, lined with sandstock bricks and contains 7.5 metre deep water.

== Heritage listing ==
The Veteran Hall archaeological remains are associated with the explorer and statesman, William Lawson, who built the first substantial house on the site. The remains can potentially provide insights into settlement in the area and 19th century pastoralism, due to their intactness. The site has the potential to yield information about the second occupants of the site, the Metropolitan Water Supply Board, who occupied the site during the early phases of the Upper Nepean Scheme until the early years of the 20th century, when the Military took it over. The remains make a positive contribution to the landscape and relate harmoniously to the visual catchment of the Prospect Reservoir curtilage.

Veteran Hall House Remains was listed on the New South Wales State Heritage Register on 18 November 1999 having satisfied the following criteria.

The place is important in demonstrating the course, or pattern, of cultural or natural history in New South Wales.

Veteran Hall and its surrounds are associated with the explorer and statesman, William Lawson, who built the first substantial house on the site. The historical landscape around the house remains, including plantings, fences and access road provide important insight into the former landscape of the historical property.

The place is important in demonstrating aesthetic characteristics and/or a high degree of creative or technical achievement in New South Wales.

The remains make a positive contribution to the landscape and relate harmoniously to the visual catchment of the Prospect Reservoir curtilage.

The place has potential to yield information that will contribute to an understanding of the cultural or natural history of New South Wales.

The remains of the house, outbuildings and well can provide archaeological evidence relating to the living and working conditions on the property, when it was a large pastoral establishment, through to its later occupation by the MWS&DB; and final military use.

The place possesses uncommon, rare or endangered aspects of the cultural or natural history of New South Wales.

The archaeological remains of the house provide an opportunity to investigate the house and landholdings of a prominent and important historical figure.
