= Nelson Lawson =

Australian politician

The Honourable Nelson Lawson

Member for County of Cumberland in the New South Wales Legislative Council
- In office August 1848 – February 1849 Serving with Charles Cowper
- Preceded by: William Lawson
- Succeeded by: Robert Fitzgerald

Personal details
- Born: Nelson Simmons Lawson; 1 May 1806 HMS Lady Nelson
- Died: 3 February 1849 (aged 42) Prospect, New South Wales, Australia
- Children: 6
- Parent: William Lawson

Nelson Simmons Lawson, MLC (1 May 1806 – 3 February 1849) was an Australian politician. He was born at sea on the Lady Nelson. He was the son of British explorer William Lawson and Sarah Lawson (née Leadbeater). His first wife was Honoria Mary Dickinson, whom he married on 7 January 1836, and with whom he had six children. His second wife was Sarah Anne Kirke. In August 1848, he was elected as one of two members for the County of Cumberland in the New South Wales Legislative Council, and so he succeeded his father. At the age of 42, Lawson died near Prospect in 1849.

== See also ==
- Members of the New South Wales Legislative Council, 1843–1851
- Results of the 1848 New South Wales colonial election

New South Wales Legislative Council
Preceded by William Lawson	Member for County of Cumberland; Aug 1848 – Feb 1849; With: Charles Cowper	Succeeded by Robert Fitzgerald
