= Members of the New South Wales Legislative Council, 1823–1843 =

This is a list of members of the New South Wales Legislative Council from 1823 to 1843. All members were appointed.

Name	Years in office
Alexander Baxter	1829–1831
Archibald Bell, Sr.	1832–1837
Alexander Berry	1828–1856
John Blaxland	1829–1844
James Bowman	1823–1825
William Broughton	1829–1843
John Campbell	1829–1830
Robert Campbell	1825–1843
Edward Close	1829–1839
Michael Cotton	1829–1834
James Dowling	1836–1843
Francis Forbes	1823–1836
John Gibbes	1834–1843; 1848–1855
Frederick Goulburn	1823–1825
John Jamison	1837–1843
Richard Jones	1829–1843; 1850–1852
John Kinchela	1831–1836
Phillip King	1839; 1850–1856
Burman Lauga	1831–1834
Patrick Lindesay	1827–1832
William Lithgow	1829–1848
Hannibal Macarthur	1830–1848
James Macarthur	1839–1843; 1848–1856; 1866–1867
John Macarthur	1825–1832
Alexander Macleay	1825–1836; 1843–1848
Maurice O'Connell	1838–1848
John Oxley	1823–1825
John Plunkett	1836–1841; 1843–1856
Thomas Scott	1824–1829
Kenneth Snodgrass	1833–1838; 1848–1850
William Stewart	1823–1827
Roger Therry	1841–1845; 1856–1859
Edward Thomson	1837–1854; 1856–1879
Charles Throsby	1825–1828
