= Glenleigh Estate =

- Location within Sydney Location within Australia
- 33°46′36″S 150°39′12″E
- Location: 427 Mulgoa Road, Regentville, City of Penrith, New South Wales, Australia

History
- Built: 1882–1884

Site notes
- Architect: William Wilkinson Wardell

New South Wales Heritage Register
- Official name: Glenleigh Estate
- Type: state heritage (landscape)
- Designated: 2 April 1999
- Reference no.: 346
- Type: Homestead Complex
- Category: Farming and Grazing
- Builders: Mr Willis; Mr James Buchanan

Glenleigh Estate is a heritage-listed private residence located at 427 Mulgoa Road in the outer western Sydney suburb of Regentville, New South Wales, Australia. It was designed by William Wilkinson Wardell and built from 1882 to 1884 by Mr Willis and Mr James Buchanan. The property is privately owned. It was added to the New South Wales State Heritage Register on 2 April 1999.

== History ==
=== The Ewan family and the construction of 'Glenleigh' ===
James Ewan was born in 1843 near Edinburgh. After the Grand Tour of Europe, his family immigrated to Sydney in 1849, where his father was appointed headmaster of the York Street Free Church of Scotland school. In 1854 James' sister Elizabeth married John Frazer, who owned a successful wholesale grocery business. Three years later the family ties resulted in James obtaining a position as a clerk in the warehouse. Soon after, Ewan's second sister married William Mason, who was invited to become a partner in Frazer and Co. In 1869, at the age of 26, Ewan became a partner in the firm, brought about by the death of Manson and Frazer's poor health. In the same year a friend of Frazer's, James Watson, bought a quarter share in the company. The family ties were further cemented when Watson married Ewan's last sister, Margaret in 1871. In the same year Ewan became engaged to Marion Reid, daughter of Reverend John Reid and sister of future Prime Minister of Australia George Houston Reid.

With these three directors Frazer and Co. became the largest and most successful shipping merchants and importers. The Company assured Ewan's wealth, although he became director of the United Insurance Company and the Waratah Coal Company. He was also director and then chairman of the Australasian Steam Navigation Company In addition he was a magistrate, honorary treasurer of Sydney Hospital and a member of several charities. Despite all this, Ewan shied away from public life.

In 1881 James Ewan purchased 40 hectares (99 acres) at Regentville, near Penrith, from the former Sir John Jamison (Regentville) Estate. Ewan commissioned eminent architect W. W. Wardell to design Glenleigh. Previously living in Darling Point, Woollahra, Ewan's health was failing and it is thought to have prompted his move to the celebrated clean air of the Blue Mountains foothills. By then Marion had given birth to six of their eight children, all of whom were under the age of eight.

In March 1882 Ewan was advised to travel to England for a kidney treatment. In his absence, he left his brother-in-law Watson in charge of overseeing the construction, in conjunction with Wardell. Mr. Willis, a local Penrith builder had begun work on the house in May 1882. A dispute arose regarding payment and a design change. Watson and Wardell were unable to resolve the matter and in January 1883 city builder, John Buchanan was given the contract. Buchanan worked frequently with Wardell, including renovations to Glanworth, Watson's house in Darling Point, Woollahra - Ewan had lived next door during these works and frequently visited the house on their completion. Wardell was also an advocate of the interior decorators Lyon, Cottier & Co., Watson employing the Company to decorate Glanworth and it is possibly through this association that Ewan became familiar with both Wardell and Lyon, Cottier & Co. Lyon, Cottier & Co. are attributed with the elaborate interior decoration, although there is no documentary evidence to confirm this.

Glenleigh marked a significant departure in Ewan's architectural tastes, his former home Ranelagh, in an Italianate style was befitting of a city merchant, but not a country gentleman. Instead, Glenleigh referred to Ewan's heritage, being in a Scottish vernacular farmhouse style. Wardell was concurrently building Grafton Wharf warehouses for Frazer and Co. and the two structures bear a resemblance to each other. The Grafton Wharf was constructed of Hayes Best White bricks, which Ewan liked so much he asked that they also be used at Glenleigh. Documentary evidence to this effect discounts local folklore that Glenleigh was constructed with ballast bricks from one of Ewan's import ships.

The Ewan's moved into Glenleigh in 1884, although Ewan spent many nights in the city at Watson's Glanworth for business purposes. Marion remained in Penrith, being visited by Maggie Watson and her children for several days at a time until Maggie became unwell and travelled with her family back to England. Watson's departure left the business affairs on Ewan's shoulders, doing further damage to his health. In 1889 the decision was made to sell the company, due to the death of Maggie and Ewan's constant health problems.

As such a large house, "Glenleigh" required the employment of two female servants, a governess and a maid, who lived in the main house, as well as four women and seven men, who occupied cottages on the property. These men and women saw to the dairy herd and the horses. Marion also had constructed Hope Cottage, a convalescent home for sick servants of "not so kindly employees". Ewan also made a substantial donation to the establishment of the Nepean Cottage Hospital, now the Nepean District Hospital.

Despite his generosity, the local community did not warm to him - there was no local announcement of his death in August 1903 and very few local residents attended - in sharp contrast to the 200 Sydney merchants and bankers. It was left to Marion, who lived a further 11 years, to endear the community through her charity work and support of the Presbyterian Church. She died in July 1914.

Mariette (2003:52) believes that Ewan was a financially shrewd man, hard working and loyal to his family. To him, wealth enabled him to "indulgence in quieter pursuits, including his family, his involvement in his agricultural interests and the running of his convalescent home for sick servants. Yet, despite his acts of benevolence, his apparent parsimony and reticence did not endear him to the people of Penrith who saw him as a hard-headed Scottish merchant whose main interests lay in the commercial life of Sydney rather than at home in Penrith - a reputation that lives on today, immortalised in the bricks and mortar of Glenleigh."

'Glenleigh' was sold in 1917 to Messrs Morris and Ransley, who let it to an ostrich farmer. The house continued as a gentleman's residence until 1933, when it was purchased to Charles Smith. Smith leased the property to a church mission, who used it to house Aboriginal girls. In 1940 Dr Charles Monticone, an eccentric Italian, bought the house. Shirley Hazzard immortalised him as Dr Montyfiore in her novel "The Transit of Venus". Hazzard's evacuation, as a schoolgirl, from Sydney for fear of Japanese invasion in 1941 to "Glenleigh" by Monticone formed the basis of Dr Montyfiore. Monticone lived as a recluse, except for his French housekeeper, until 1979.

The estate was put up for auction by Raine & Horne in 1984, with 34.9 hectares (86 acres) of grounds with access to the Nepean River and a private boat ramp. The present owners purchased the house in 1984 and are in the process of reinstating the interior and renovating the building more generally.

Painter William Whittlam was responsible for the three-year project of helping restore Glenleigh's interior paint finishes by scraping away orange paint a previous owner had applied to engraved brass fire surrounds, removing cream distemper from walls once covered in stencilled butterflies and swirling floral patterns. Then owner and entrepreneur Fred Grotto had interests in suburban wedding reception centres, food outlet, nursery, manufacturing and photo laboratories. The ceilings were relatively untouched and may be unique in Australia. In the music room, paintings of Mozart, Haydn and Mendelssohn are seen; in the library Shakespeare, Milton, Scott and Burns hint at Ewan's literary tastes in the 1890s.

=== William Wilkinson Wardell, architect ===
William Wilkinson Wardell was born in 1823 in Poplar, London. He trained as an engineer, before spending some time at sea. On his return he worked for the commissioners of sewers and for an architect. Through his interest in Gothic Revival architecture he became friends with Augustus Pugin and Cardinal John Henry Newman. Wardell designed a number of churches in the London area, the largest being the Church of Mary and Michael, Commercial Road, Whitechapel.

Wardell and his wife, Lucy Ann Butler, immigrated to Melbourne in 1858, due to Wardell's poor health. He was appointed clerk of works and chief architect in the Department of Works and Buildings. He was dismissed in 1878 and moved to Sydney, where he established a successful private business. He continued to design churches, public buildings and business premises, domestic architecture formed only a small portion of his business.

By 2017 the property has been sold to Yundi Hua, chairman of the Shanghai Minhang Real Estate Development Company, who are said to be planning to land-bank the 35-hectare (86-acre) property and complete its restoration begun under previous owner, Graham Windridge and the late Fred Grotto.

== Description ==
Grounds/ estate

34.9 hectares (86 acres) zoned Rural 1A(1) under Interim Development Order No. 93. Water for homesite use is pumped to underground wells and passes through a filtering device to various water connections in the residential buildings. Water for garden and paddock use is reticulated through a fully irrigated water hydrant system. A septic system is connected to the buildings.

Crucially sited, forms a focal point at the junction of the Mulgoa and Nepean Valleys and the Glenbrook Gorge. Glenleigh is an extremely important element in the landscape as seen from the Mulgoa Road, Western Freeway and western railway.

Two drives approach the house, the front drive from Mulgoa Road to the north, and a back drive from the east off Mulgoa Road, climbing more sharply up the elevated ridge on which the house and outbuildings are sited. These buildings given their elevation and west, north and easterly aspects, have commanding views of the Nepean Gorge, Blue Mountains and Penrith Valley.

The drive approaches the house complex from Mulgoa Road to the east. Approached by the original drive of olives & pines. The driveway from Mulgoa Road was originally fenced and lined with stone pines (Pinus pinea) and some Japanese black pines (P.thunbergii) some of which still remain.

A large garden surrounds the house with some intact remnants of an elaborate 19th century garden layout and details. It contains some notable plants including a large Queensland kauri pine (Agathis robusta), large camphor laurel (Cinnamomum camphora), several Chir or Himalayan pines (Pinus roxburghii) to the north, several stone pines (P.pinea) to the north and lining the front or northern drive.

Significant plantings of dwarf to medium-sized conifers and other elements have occurred since the 1980s and 1990s including a blue spruce (Picea pungens 'Glauca') north of the house, a golden Conybeare cypress (Cupressus macrocarpa 'Saligna Aurea') west of the house, a formal garden of dwarf conifers south-west of the house, a rose arbor allee in a similar location, a weeping mulberry (Morus nigra 'Pendula') south of the house, a golden rain tree (Koelreuteria paniculata) south of the aviary. A small trial macadamia (M.integrifolia cv.) orchard has been established along with a commercial nursery south of the house.

House

Scottish baronial two-storey house with more austere service wing. All built of hard white furnace bricks with contrasting red brick lintels & string courses. Large timber entrance porch and two-storey verandah to east & south fine interiors with cedar joinery, marble fireplaces, painted & stencilled ceilings. Constructed in a vernacular Scottish farmhouse style, the building is asymmetrical. The front elevation features a bay window extending the full two storeys, the associated roofline in the form of a ziggurat. The house has a variable pitch slate roof.

A large entrance porch and tiled hall on the ground floor lead to a large formal sitting room, reading room, music room, formal dining room and kitchen, family room, informal sitting room, utility room, bathroom and a second bath and sauna room.

The first floor is reached by two internal cedar staircases. Upstairs a wide central passageway leads to 6 bedrooms, an additional bathroom, living room, store room and out onto the suspended verandahs.

The 653 square metres (7,030 sq ft) of living area has rooms with high ceilings. Some have marble, tiled and engraved brass fireplaces, original plaster and stencilled wall and ceiling finishes, rendered walls, cedar joinery and panelling.

The interior decoration has been attributed to Lyon, Cottier & Co. Ewan was exposed to the company's work on a number of other occasions. This, together with the not inconsiderable similarities to the Company's other commissions, is given as evidence. "Glenleigh" is decorated in the fashionable style of the Company, which arose out of the Pre-Raphaelite and Arts and Crafts Movement. A more detailed description of the interior decoration is available in Mariette (2003).

Outbuildings

Group of three Victorian domestic buildings, all extremely well constructed and in almost original condition. Constructed of brick, timber & slate, approached by original drive of olives & pines. A complimentary coach house, stables & dairy (to the house). All are built of hard white furnace bricks with contrasting red brick lintels & string courses.

Stables

Two storey brick building with timber framed, pitched slate roof, concrete floor and rendered walls. Floor area of 138 square meters. Presently disused.

Manager's residence

Of similar construction to the main house, lined internally with plaster and asbestos cement, floor area of 51 square meters.

Caretaker's cottage

externally clad with weatherboards and asbestos cement it has a galvanised iron roof.

There are other structures adjacent, including a garden shed housing a water pump filtering equipment and gardening materials and a machinery shed of four bays used to store equipment, plant and vehicles, 22.6 x 20 meters.

Miscellaneous structures include a bird aviary, which is rectangular with a small gabled roof.

Four women and seven men (staff) occupied cottages on the property. These saw to the dairy herd and the horses. Marion also had constructed Hope Cottage, a convalescent home for sick servants of "not so kindly employees".

Ewan was involved in his agricultural interests and the running of his convalescent home for sick servants.

=== Modifications and dates ===
- 1881 – 40 hectares (99 acres) bought
- 1882-4 – House built.
- Dates? – Cottages on the property for staff. Marion also had constructed Hope Cottage, a convalescent home for sick servants
- 1917 – Sold to Messrs Morris and Ransley, who let it to an ostrich farmer. The house continued as a gentleman's residence until 1933, when it was purchased to Charles Smith. Smith leased tit to a church mission, who used it to house Aboriginal girls.
- 1984 – Estate auction described a landscape estate of 34.9 hectares (86 acres) of mown and landscaped grounds with access to the Nepean River and a private boat ramp. It noted the main house, grounds containing several outbuildings including a stable with upstairs living quarters, a one-bedroomed manager's house with living room, kitchen and bathroom and a caretaker's cottage with bedroom, living room, combined kitchen and dining room and modern bathroom.
- 1984+ – Reinstating the interior and renovating the building
- 1992 – A Victorian parterre (flower bed) garden plan was devised by Michael Lehany & James Broadbent, based on photographic evidence, and reinstated.
- 2007 – Stone pine avenue replaced with same species - and 3 Pinus thunbergii (Japanese black pine) like for like. Owner also planted two Wollemi pines (Wollemia nobilis) in the drive avenue near creek - which continues a tradition here of mixed specimen and conifer planting - e.g.: Queensland kauri pine.

== Heritage listing ==
As at 27 August 2008, Glenleigh is significant as the home of prominent merchant James Ewan and his family. The house, in the Scottish farmhouse vernacular style, displays Ewan's Scottish heritage, as well as his private nature. The house is significant as a rare example of the domestic work of architect W. W. Wardell, who was favoured by the Sydney rising middle class of the 1880s. The lavish interior decoration, probably by the firm of Lyons, Cottier and Co., was for private appreciation. The work of the decorating Company is of State significance in its own right, as one of the most complete and well preserved examples of the Company's work. While in the form of a country villa, "Glenleigh" is unusual, being constructed and used as a primarily place of residence for the Ewan family.

Glenleigh Estate was listed on the New South Wales State Heritage Register on 2 April 1999 having satisfied the following criteria.

The place has a strong or special association with a person, or group of persons, of importance of cultural or natural history of New South Wales's history.

'Glenleigh' is of state significant through its associations with James Ewan, prominent merchant and director of Frazer and Co. - a successful wholesale grocery business, which grew into a substantial mercantile import company. The Ewan family made a substantial contribution to the establishment of the Nepean Cottage Hospital, today the Nepean District Hospital.

The place is important in demonstrating aesthetic characteristics and/or a high degree of creative or technical achievement in New South Wales.

The interior decoration of "Glenleigh" is of state significance as a rare intact example of interior decoration of the 1880s, probably by the firm of Lyon, Cottier & Co. The opulence of the decoration is in keeping with the Arts and Crafts movement. Devotees were drawn from the educated middle-classes and "Glenleigh" exemplifies the taste of this class.

'Glenleigh' Scottish farmhouse vernacular style is significant as a departure from the Italianate style chosen by the majority of the wealthy for their dwellings.

The place possesses uncommon, rare or endangered aspects of the cultural or natural history of New South Wales.

A rare domestic example of W. W. Wardell's iconic designs.

The interiors of "Glenleigh" are of state significance as a rare surviving example of Arts and Crafts style decoration. Examples of Lyon, Cottier & Co.s interior decorations are not altogether rare, what distinguishes "Glenleigh" is the extent of the preservation.

== See also ==
- List of heritage houses in Sydney
