= GPHS =

GPHS can mean:

== Schools ==
Australia:

- Glenmore Park High School, a co-educational, comprehensive government high school in Glenmore Park, New South Wales

Canada:

- Grant Park High School, in Winnipeg, Manitoba, Canada

The Philippines:

- Gregorio Perfecto High School, in Manila, Philippines

United States:

- Gage Park High School, in Chicago, Illinois
- Galena Park High School in Galena Park, Texas (Houston area)
- Gatlinburg-Pittman High School, in Gatlinburg, Tennessee
- Glacier Peak High School, in Snohomish, Washington
- Gwynn Park High School, in Brandywine CDP, Prince George's County, Maryland (Washington, DC area)

== Other ==
- General Purpose Heat Source, a radioisotope source used in space power generation
