= James Ewan =

Australian financier and philanthropist (1843 - 1903)

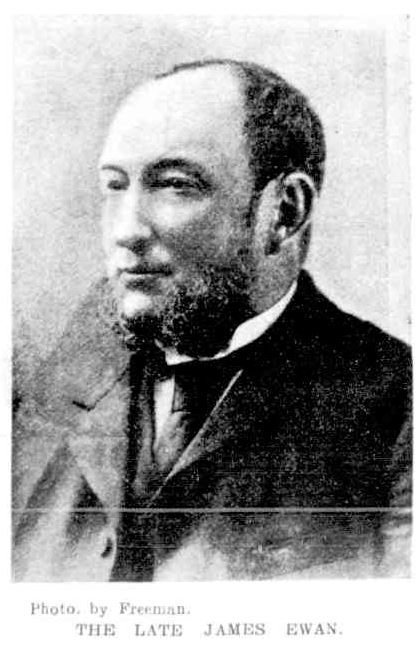
- Born: 18th of July, 1843; Edinburgh, Scotland
- Died: 1st of August, 1903; Penrith, New South Wales

James Ewan J.P. (July 18, 1843 – August 1, 1903) was a Scottish-born Australian financier, mercantilist, and philanthropist. He held a number of high-profile financial positions, including being a long time partner in John Frazer and Co., Chairman of the Australia Steam Navigation Company, City Bank of Sydney, and the United Insurance Company. Ewan made considerable philanthropic donations to the Sydney Hospital, Benevolent Society, Presbyterian Church, the Women's Guild, and the Nepean Cottage Hospital (now known as the Nepean Hospital).

== Personal life ==
James Ewan was born on the 18th of July 1843 near Leith Walk, Edinburgh to headmaster and geography author father of the same name, and mother Mary née Blair. He and his family arrived in Sydney, Australia in March 1849 on board the Zemindar, and was educated at his father's school on 61-63 York Street Sydney, and later at the West Maitland Presbyterian High School. As a young man in 1857, Ewan began to work with the wholesale grocery store owner turned-mercantile and brother in law John Frazer.

In 1872, Ewan married Marion Jane Reid, daughter of Reverend John Reid, and sister of the 4th Prime Minister of Australia; George Reid. Ewan had two sons, who were squatters who managed his pastoral properties, and six daughters who he married to prominent doctors of Sydney. This includes prominent Macquarie Street physician Dr. Alexander Murray-Will, Dr George Armstrong of College Street, and College Street Cardiologist and Lecturer of Clinical Medicine at University of Sydney; Dr James Macdonald Gill.

Ewan died in his Glenleigh Mansion in the late afternoon of Saturday, the 1st of August 1903 surrounded by six doctors and a number of nurses, after a short week-long battle with Influenza. He had suffered of Bright's disease throughout most of his life. He was buried in Rockwood cemetery, and left large fortunes to his widow, and all of his children except his eldest son. His funeral was attended by 200 Sydney merchants, bankers, and doctors.

== Career ==
After the retirement of John Frazer in 1869, Ewan became a partner of John Frazer and Co with his future brother-in-law James Watson; who later became the Treasurer of New South Wales. During the period Ewan and Watson ran John Frazer and Co, the company became the largest and most successful shipping and importing company in Sydney, securing the fortunes of both of the partners. Ewan's 'keen business ability' and vast business connections, soon made him an attractive business personality, joining the directors of the United Insurance Company on the 25th of April 1875, the Australasian Steam Navigation Company in January 1878, the Waratah Coal Company, and the Chamber of Commerce.

After a brief visit to England in 1882 for treatment for his kidney condition., Ewan returned to the position of chairman of the Australasian Steam Navigation Company in January 1884. But after a series of organised labor movements against the company occurring in 1879 and 1884, and Ewan's worsening health, he decided to dissolve the company. The company was dissolved for a total sum of £727,000 with 'all the partners retiring on fairly ample fortunes'. The companies fleet was sold for £200,000, the ASN Co building was sold to the NSW Government for £275,000. Ewan retained his shared ownership with Watson in the Grafton Bond Store, and leased its use to the Burns, Philp & Co Ltd for £14,500 a year

After the A.S.N was dissolved, Ewan took up the position of chairman of the City Bank of Sydney in 1885, leading the company through a fire that destroyed the Martin Place offices in 1890 and the Panic of 1893; where it remained as one of the four surviving banks in Sydney. In addition, an honorary treasurer of the Sydney Hospital, and a number of other charities. Despite this, he shied away from public life, not pursuing a position in parliament, despite being described as a 'privately ardent politician'.

In later years, Ewan bought into a number of pastoral estates in the Western Districts of NSW. Having his eldest son manage the Gunningbland Station in the Central West region near Forbes, New South Wales, and his youngest son manage the Coobang Station, near Parkes, New South Wales and Neild Station. He also acquired two stations in Queensland; Gunnawarra and Waterview.

== Philanthropy ==
Ewan was a very active member of the Presbyterian Church. He took very active and leading parts in several charitable institutions. He greatly assisted in the building fund of the Nepean Cottage Hospital by donation of £250. Now called the Nepean Hospital, it is now a major public teaching hospital, the largest in the Nepean-Blue Mountains Local Health District

Ewan also constructed and maintained a convalescent home called "Hope Cottage" on his Glenleigh Estate. After Ewan's death, Marion Ewan large sums of her fortune to charitable activities run through the church in an attempt to endear the nearby community, of which she felt largely disconnected from due to James' frequent staying's at Watson's Glanworth Estate for business purposes. There was no local announcement of his death.

The Ewan family's contributions to the Presbyterian Church is memorialised in the Presbyterian Church in Doonmore Street, Penrith. As well as a foundation stone at the Frazer Memorial Presbyterian Church in Springfield.

Ewan passed his charitable nature down to his children, with his daughter being memorialised through Ewan House at Knox Grammar School in Wahroonga, New South Wales for heavily discounting the sale of John Thomas Toohey's former residences for use for use in the preparatory school.
