= William Balmain =

Royal Navy surgeon (1762–1803)

- Born: February 2, 1762; Balhepburn, Rhynd, Perthshire, Scotland
- Died: November 17, 1803 (aged 41); Bloomsbury, London, England
- Burial place: St Giles-in-the-Fields, London
- Occupations: Naval surgeon, colonial administrator, magistrate
- Employer: Royal Navy
- Known for: Assistant surgeon with the First Fleet, Principal Surgeon of New South Wales
- Partner: Margaret Dawson
- Children: Ann, Jane, John William

William Balmain (2 February 1762 – 17 November 1803) was a Scottish naval surgeon and civil administrator who sailed as an assistant surgeon with the First Fleet to establish the first European settlement in Australia, and later to take up the appointment of the principal surgeon, for New South Wales.

== Early life and career ==
Balmain was born at Balhepburn in the Parish of Rhynd, Perthshire, Scotland, to Alexander Balmain (b. 1714), tenant farmer, and his second wife, Jane Henderson. Little is known of his early life but in 1779 he was enrolled as a medical student at Edinburgh University. Next year he entered the Royal Navy to train as a Surgeon's Mate.

From November 1784 he served on Nautilus during a survey of the Das Voltas region of South West Africa (Namibia) which the British government was considering as a possible destination for the convicts then overcrowding British prisons and hulks.

On 21 October 1786 Balmain applied to join the group of officers to establish the new colony in New South Wales and was appointed third assistant surgeon to the principal surgeon, John White. Eleven ships, including six transports, carried 772 convicts, officers, marines, crews, and some wives and children, travelled more than 10,000 miles (16,000 km) to reach the unknown shore. Before the fleet sailed, Balmain correctly diagnosed a prevalent convict illness at Portsmouth. He sailed as surgeon on the convict ship Alexander. On the voyage Balmain delivered the Fleet's first child.

== Assistant Surgeon in New South Wales ==
On arrival at Port Jackson, Sydney Harbour, the surgeons had the difficult task of attending to the sick in tents while supervising the construction of emergency timber hospital huts.

By August 1788 tensions between Balmain and the principal surgeon, John White, became so great that they fought a duel with pistols in which Balmain received a small flesh wound in the right thigh. Ralph Clark commented "it would not have rested there had the governor not taken the matter in hand and convinced the two sons of Aescalipius that it was much better to draw blood with the point of their lance from the arm of their patients than to do it with pistol balls from each other."

The early settlement suffered from severe lack of food. In December 1788 Balmain recorded that a convict had died from 'want of sustenance'.

When White was absent from the settlement, Balmain found himself in charge of the makeshift hospital, stocked with only rudimentary supplies, and assisted by untrained convict personnel.

The arrival of the Second Fleet in mid-1790 threw up new challenges for Balmain and the other surgeons. The treatment of the convicts had been so harsh that they were confronted with large numbers of sick and dying people, and the death rate rose alarmingly over a two-month period.

In September 1790 Governor Arthur Phillip was speared in the shoulder by an Aboriginal man named Willemering at the place he named Manly. Balmain skillfully removed the broken spear which was protruding through the shoulder and dressed the wound. Henry Waterhouse described the operation: "We got up within two hours to Sydney Cove, when the surgeons were immediately sent for and Mr Balmain attended with his instruments. On his examining the wound, the governor desired him candidly to tell him how many hours he had to settle his affairs ... but Mr Balmain made us all happy by confidently assuring the governor he did not apprehend any fatal consequences from the wound. The spear was then extracted." Phillip expressed his appreciation by appointing him to the post of Surgeon to the Norfolk Island Colony.

== On Norfolk Island ==
Balmain arrived at Norfolk Island in November 1791.

On the same ship was a young convict girl Margaret Dawson. She had been a servant in London and sentenced to seven years' transportation in February 1786 for stealing from her employer. At fifteen years of age, she was one of the youngest convicts on the First Fleet, sailing on the Lady Penrhyn. How well Balmain had known her in Sydney is not known, but they formed a de facto relationship that resulted in the birth of a daughter named Ann, on Norfolk Island in May 1794.

On 22 Oct 1793 Balmain was one of the signatories of the proceedings of the first Settlers Meeting held on the island.

In January 1794 the commandant of Norfolk Island, Philip Gidley King appointed Balmain as a Civil Magistrate to Norfolk Island. In this role he signed a proclamation fixing the prices for labour and goods, and declaring that monies gained by duties levied on the sale of spirits were to be spent on the establishment of schools.

Through his clemency and sensitivity as a magistrate he helped to quell a riot between soldiers and convicts following a brawl outside the playhouse in November 1794.

When John White returned to England on leave, Balmain was recalled to Sydney as acting Principal Surgeon. He and his family left Norfolk Island in August 1795. Much of the stock they left behind was destroyed in a gale the next month.

== Later years in Sydney ==
In May 1797, following White's resignation, Balmain was appointed Principal Surgeon of the Colony. By this time there were 1600 settlers and several thousand convicts, but Balmain had only one assistant surgeon and found the task of caring for the health of the entire population arduous and frustrating. He petitioned the new Governor, John Hunter for assistance and an increase in salary but was rewarded only by appointment as Civil Magistrate in New South Wales. One of his first tasks was to sit on the court of enquiry in May 1797 into the treatment of convicts on the Britannia. He made recommendations for better medical treatment on board the transports, but these were not adopted. Governor Hunter described him as "an active and spirited magistrate".

In his role as magistrate he had the challenging task of maintaining an uneasy peace between the often arrogant soldiers of the New South Wales Corps and the settlers, both free and emancipist (ex-convicts). This resulted in the affair of John Baughan, a settler who had tried to set up a flour mill. In February 1796, soldiers and officers destroyed Baughan's house and threatened his life and, when Balmain promised protection to Baughan and urged him to give evidence against the soldiers, the Corps expressed indignation at what they regarded as his "shamefully malevolent interference in the affairs of the Corps. The affair became a test of strength between the colony's civil authority, represented by Balmain, and the military, represented by Captain John Macarthur. In the end, the matter was dropped (following Balmain's withdrawal of his challenge to a duel), and Balmain received a small salary increase. The New South Wales Corps remained a thorn in the side of Governors and the civil authorities for the next 15 years.

Although two other magistrates were appointed, their ill-health meant that Balmain shouldered most of the responsibility, as well as his medical duties. This began to affect his own health, and in July 1800 he requested to return to England. As Hunter was finding his services indispensable, the request was refused.

Among other civic duties, Balmain was a member of the Orphan House Committee in September 1800, set up to supervise orphanages in Sydney and Parramatta. He was Captain of the Sydney Loyal Association, a volunteer company formed to counteract the threat of convict insurgence. He also established and completed a citizens' subscription to build a new Sydney gaol, making a personal contribution of £214.13.0 to the fund.

But there was another, more mercenary side to Balmain, leading Governor King's wife to refer to his "duplicity". He was one of a number of prominent citizens, including his former adversary John Macarthur, who formed a consortium to privately charter a ship for trade with India. In January 1800 the vessel arrived from Calcutta laden with sugar, tea, cloth and rum. Governor Hunter permitted the vessel to land, although the British government had issued clear instructions to stop the trading the military.

Shortly after Governor King took office in September 1800, he appointed Balmain to the post of Naval Officer to the colony, which included the office of Registrar of Export and Imports which could be used to advantage in covert trading activities. Balmain may have been holding this position unofficially under Hunter, hence Macarthur's interest in including him in the consortium.

When Governor King ordered all trading in spirits to cease, Balmain was left with 1400 gallons of rum which he was unable to sell. King allowed him to sell it privately, at substantial profit, as it had been purchased before King's arrival. This gave Balmain some financial security, but ended the consortium's lucrative venture.

Over the years Balmain received a number of grants of land which, together with other land purchased and leased, provided him with over 1500 acres (6 km^{2}). On 26 April 1800, he received a land grant of 550 acres on the west side of Cockle Bay. This 550 acre (2 km^{2}) grant, known as Gilchrist Place, was located on the peninsula which is now the suburbs of Balmain and Rozelle.

Balmain also received a small private income from 1799 to 1801 as Sydney agent for a London-based company in connection with a trading ship, receiving a small percentage of the firm's profits.

On the personal level, Balmain and Dawson continued to cohabit. Daughter Ann's death in September 1797 was a tragedy, but was offset by the births of Jane in March 1797 and John William in August 1800. Jane was sent back to England in October 1800, in the care of the returning Governor Hunter.

Due to his continued declining health, Balmain again requested leave and this was agreed to by Governor King, on condition that he return on completion of his leave. On 26 August 1801 Balmain, Margaret Dawson, and John William sailed from Sydney on board the whaler Albion.

== Return to England and death ==
Balmain and family arrived in London on 25 March 1802. He soon met with Sir Joseph Banks, describing the growth of New South Wales, and submitting a paper presenting his views on the customs and laws of the colony. Another paper, entitled "Government of New South Wales" is also thought to be his work. Nothing came of these contributions, but they show Balmain as a thoughtful critic of the colony's institutions.

Balmain had left D'Arcy Wentworth, whom he had first met on Norfolk Island, in charge of his affairs in the colony, including selling his remaining rum stocks, taking over his private agency, and acting as attorney on his investments.

In August 1802 Balmain visited his mother in Scotland.

In December 1802 his leave was terminated and he was instructed to return to Sydney, but objected on the grounds of unsettled private affairs and family engagements. He sought to retire from the service but his request was refused. By August 1803 the instruction to return to Sydney was withdrawn, and he was appointed as Surgeon to the Forces, at the military hospital at Dunmow, Essex. (Thomas Jamison, a former colleague of Balmain's on the First Fleet and on Norfolk Island, replaced him as Principal Surgeon of New South Wales.)

It is unlikely that Balmain took up his new position in Essex as by November 1803 he was dying from liver disease. On 17 November Balmain died at Bloomsbury, London, and was buried in the churchyard of St Giles-in-the-Fields, on 25 November. The site of the grave is no longer marked; however a plaque to Balmain can be found inside the church. His old foe and trading partner John Macarthur attended the funeral, as did Henry Ball, commander of the First Fleet vessel HMS Supply. A daughter was born on the same day at Liverpool, to which Margaret and the two children had been sent earlier that year, but it is unlikely that she survived childhood.

In his will Balmain provided a yearly sum of £50 for "my dear friend Margaret Dawson, otherwise Henderson … whose tenderness to me, while in ill health, claims my warmest gratitude". He also provided an annuity for his mother, and the balance of his estate was to be held in trust for his natural children by Margaret.

It is likely that the name 'Henderson' - Balmain's mother's maiden name - was adopted by Margaret and the children to avoid any social disgrace in class conscious England as a result of Margaret's former convict status and Balmain's position as a respected medical officer and administrator.

Balmain and Thomas Jamison (see Jamisontown, New South Wales) were the only First Fleet surgeons to have physical localities named after them. As a surgeon Balmain worked tirelessly under conditions of extreme hardship and deprivation. As an administrator he showed courage and fairness, though not always sound judgement in the face of opposition, and his trading ventures tarnished his reputation. As a family man, he was devoted to his partner and children, and provided well for them.

== In popular culture ==
In the 1978 Australian television series Against the Wind, Balmain is portrayed by Anthony Hawkins.

== Bibliography ==
- Moore, John (1989). The First Fleet Marines. University of Queensland Press. ISBN 0702220655.
