= Thomas Jamison =

Irish-born Australian surgeon (1753–1811)

- Born: 10 January 1753 (Note: Date of christening, not birth); Ireland
- Died: 25 January 1811 (aged 58); London, England
- Occupation(s): Surgeon, farmer, magistrate
- Children: Sir John Jamison

Thomas Jamison (c. 1753 – 25 January 1811) was a naval surgeon, who was surgeon mate on HMS Sirius as part First Fleet which founded Colony of New South Wales in 1788. He was surgeon at the Norfolk Island settlement, before returning to Sydney and becoming primary surgeon of colony. He was also involved in mercantile dealings which led to the Rum Rebellion, and its overthrow of Governor William Bligh.

== Early life ==
Thomas Jamison was a son of William Jamison and his wife Mary (née Fisher). Thomas was baptised 10 January 1753 at Presbyterian Church in Ballywalter, County Down, Ireland.

Young Jamison excelled as a pupil at his parish school. He married comparatively early, went to live in neighbouring County Antrim, fathered several legitimate children (Mary, John and Jane), and studied to be a surgeon. He decided to join the Royal Navy to advance himself in the world, receiving a naval surgeon's warrant in either 1777 or 1780. In 1786, he was assigned to HMS Sirius as a surgeon's mate (apprentice surgeon). Sirius had been designated to act as the armed escort to a convoy of convict transports and supply ships that would become known as the First Fleet. The fleet's mission was to establish a permanent British penal colony in New South Wales, on the strategic east coast of Australia.

Jamison sailed for Australia in May 1787 from Portsmouth, southern England. He arrived safely with the fleet at their final destination, the site of the future City of Sydney, in January the following year. Shortly after their arrival, the commander of the fleet, Governor Arthur Phillip, sent a detachment of guards, convicts and naval personnel – including Jamison – from Sydney Cove to Norfolk Island. They were under orders to plant an ancillary colony on the island, which is located in the Pacific Ocean, roughly halfway between Australia and New Zealand.

== Medical career in Australia ==
Governor Phillip appointed Jamison as surgeon to the Norfolk Island colony. He would perform this role in an effective manner for the next decade despite being hindered in his work by a persistent lack of logistical support from Sydney. One of his achievements was to reduce the number of deaths occurring on the island due to dysentery. In 1790, he witnessed the catastrophic wrecking of the Sirius on a Norfolk Island reef after the vessel got into difficulties during a supply operation. Eleven months would elapse before another ship reached the isolated colonists. Norfolk Island's remoteness from Sydney enabled Jamison to live openly with a convict mistress, Elizabeth Colley, by whom he had numerous illegitimate offspring. He was also able to enrich himself by trading in pork, wheat and, later, Indian sandalwood and alcohol. One of Jamison's friends and business associates during this period was the surgeon, explorer and entrepreneur George Bass, who disappeared at sea in 1803.

Jamison remained on Norfolk Island until October 1799, when he was recalled to Sydney by the governor. Fearing that his career as a surgeon had stalled, Jamison took one year's leave and sailed for England. While there, he cultivated a set of influential patrons. His lobbying paid off: in 1801, he was appointed Surgeon-General of New South Wales by the British Government, although no date for the start of his commission was specified by the minister responsible, Lord Hobart. This lapse would cause administrative confusion after Jamison's arrival back in Sydney. Indeed, the question of Jamison's seniority was not resolved satisfactorily until 1805, when he was appointed Principal Surgeon to the colony in place of William Balmain.

Jamison had returned to Sydney aboard the Hercules in June 1802 after an eventful voyage from London (he had been forced to change ships in Rio de Janeiro because of a heated dispute with the master of his original vessel, Captain Richard Brooks). Once ensconced back in Sydney, Jamison proved to be a diligent and capable medical practitioner. He was hampered, however, by a perpetual paucity of surgical supplies and assistants, about which he complained frequently to the authorities. Nonetheless, in 1804, he was able to lead a small medical team which performed the colony's first successful vaccination of children against smallpox. He published Australia's first medical paper, General Observations on the Smallpox, as a result of this experience. Another of Jamison's innovations occurred in 1808, when he and two colleagues undertook a formal examination of the medical competence of William Redfern, who was put forward by the gubernatorial authorities in Sydney as a person fit to perform surgery in the colony. This set a precedent whereby those wishing to practice medicine in New South Wales would first have to pass a test of their qualifications.

Jamison had been appointed a magistrate following his return to Sydney. In 1805, he court-martialled two assistant surgeons for failing to attend women giving birth but this punitive course of action was later over-ruled by the British War Office on a technicality. Also in 1805, he received a 1,000-acre (4.0 km^{2}) grant of land on the Nepean River, west of Sydney, where he raised livestock and grew crops using assigned convict labour. Later, he acquired another 1,300 acres (5.3 km^{2}) of agricultural land at South Creek and on the Georges River. He also erected a house in central Sydney (in what is now Jamison Street).

== Rum Rebellion ==
Thomas Jamison possessed a hawk-like visage, a shrewd brain, abundant reserves of energy and a peppery personality. He also had a liking for money, which led to him participate in a series of maritime trading ventures whilst stationed in Sydney. This was in open defiance of government regulations which prohibited public officials from engaging in mercantile enterprises such as the lucrative rum trade. He even acquired the half-share in a merchant ship and formed business partnerships with leading settlers John Macarthur and Garnham Blaxcell.

William Bligh, the abrasive Royal Navy officer of Mutiny on the Bounty renown, arrived in Sydney in 1806 as the Governor, replacing the less confrontational Philip Gidley King. He was determined to uphold the letter of the law and impose his authority on New South Wales by stamping out the kind of unsanctioned entrepreneurial behaviour exhibited by Jamison and other representatives of the British Crown, including certain military officers serving with the New South Wales Corps.

Not long after he took office, he angered Jamison by refusing him permission to return to England on leave so that he could bring his family to the colony. In 1807 Bligh added fuel to the fire by sacking Jamison from the magistracy, claiming that the Irishman was not of upright character, and "inimical to the government" because of his dubious trading schemes. Only Jamison's undoubted medical ability saved him from being dismissed by Bligh as the colony's Principal Surgeon. Jamison may have particularly drawn Bligh ire as he was an Irishmen; Bligh was known for his anti-Irish sentiments.

In 1808 Jamison, Macarthur, Blaxcell and other disaffected colonists joined forces with the New South Wales Corps to arrest and expel Bligh from Government House in a military coup d'état that has now become known colloquially in Australia as the Rum Rebellion. Following the coup, Jamison served as the Naval Officer (Collector of Customs and Excise) in the colony's temporary, rebel government. He was also given back his seat on the magistrates' bench. This enabled him to take part in the rebel committees which interrogated Bligh's supporters and combed through Bligh's private papers, looking for evidence against him that might justify their mutinous actions.

== Death and burial ==
Jamison left Sydney for London in 1809, with some of the other mutineers, to safeguard his financial affairs and testify against Bligh at any legal proceedings that might arise as a consequence of the governor's overthrow. He leased a residence in London's fashionable Portman Square but fell ill during 1810. His condition deteriorated and he died on Upper Berkeley Street, Portman Square on 25 January 1811. Jamison's death denied him the opportunity to give evidence at the trial of Major George Johnston, of the New South Wales Corps, who had been a ring leader of the anti-Bligh plot. (Johnston's trial convened in June 1811.)

Jamison was buried in the graveyard of the Anglican Church of St Mary, Paddington Green, London. Jamison's headstone no longer exists so the exact location of his burial plot in St Mary's graveyard is unknown. (The graveyard was remodelled and turned into a memorial park during Victorian times.)

Jamison's widow, Rebecca, survived him by many years, seeing out her days living quietly in Ireland. She was awarded a government pension as a result of the efforts of her son, Sir John Jamison, who had vigorously pursued her case with the relevant authorities. Rebecca's death occurred in County Antrim in 1838.

== Jamison's legacy ==
A few places in Australia, particularly in New South Wales are named after Jamison – the Sydney suburb of Jamisontown near Penrith—the site of his first land grant from the colonial government, Jamison High School in South Penrith, and the Jamison Centre in Canberra also commemorates his name.

Jamison appears as a character in Evelyn Cheesman's 1950 novel Landfall the Unknown: Lord Howe Island 1788.
