= Glenmore Park =

- Suburb
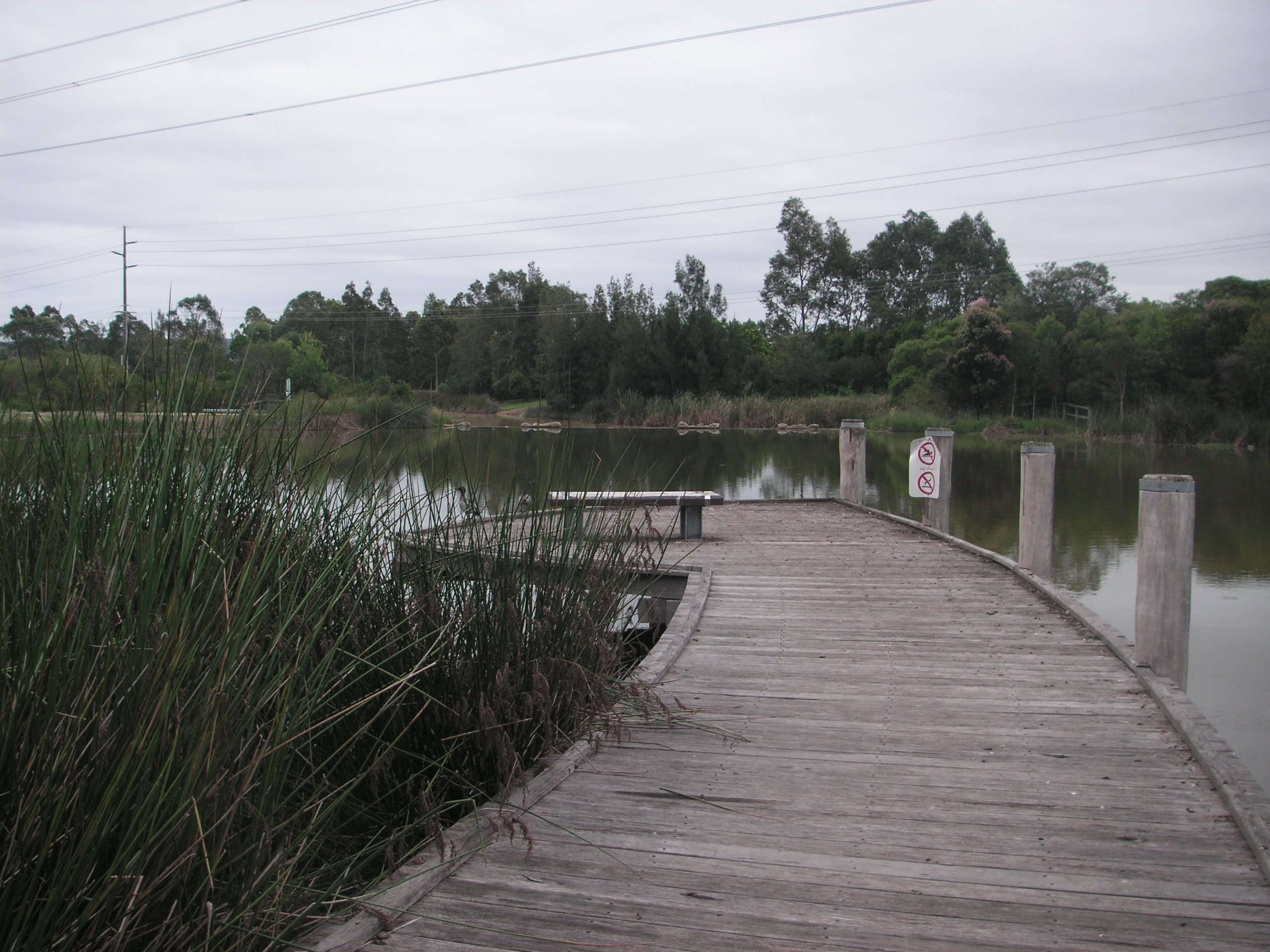
- Blue Hills Wetland

- Interactive map of Glenmore Park
- Country: Australia
- State: New South Wales
- City: Sydney
- LGA: Penrith City Council
- Location: 54 km (34 mi) W of Sydney CBD
- Established: 1824

Government
  - State electorate: Badgerys Creek
  - Federal division: Lindsay

Area
  - Total: 8.3 km^{2} (3.2 sq mi)
- Elevation: 48 m (157 ft)

Population
  - Total: 25,021 (SAL 2021)
- Postcode: 2745
Suburbs around Glenmore Park
Jamisontown	South Penrith	Orchard Hills
Regentville	Glenmore Park	Orchard Hills
Mulgoa	Mulgoa	Orchard Hills

Glenmore Park is a suburb of Sydney, in the state of New South Wales, Australia. Glenmore Park is located 54 kilometres (34 mi) west of the Sydney central business district, in the local government area of the City of Penrith and is part of the Greater Western Sydney region.

Glenmore Park is south of Jamisontown and South Penrith with its boundary being the M4 Motorway. The suburbs of Regentville and Mulgoa are located to its west and south, while Orchard Hills runs along its eastern boundary with the Northern Road as its dividing line. Glenmore Park is one of Penrith City's largest and most rapidly developing housing estates. Its development has been carefully planned to cater for the social, economic and recreational needs of its residents.

== History ==
=== European settlement ===
Following the arrival of British settlers, the colonial government granted land in the area to one of New South Wales' leading private citizens, Sir John Jamison (1776–1844), who arrived in Sydney in 1814. Sir John acquired further parcels of land adjoining his original property, thus establishing a magnificent agricultural estate which he called Regentville. In 1824, Sir John constructed a lavish mansion on the Regentville estate. Sadly, however, the mansion burned down in the 1860s due to arson.

=== Aboriginal culture ===
Prior to European settlement, what is now Glenmore Park was home to the Mulgoa people who spoke the Darug language. They lived a hunter-gatherer lifestyle governed by traditional laws, which had their origins in the Dreamtime. Their homes were bark huts called 'gunyahs'. They hunted kangaroos and emus for meat, and gathered yams, berries and other native plants.

Henry Cox, another prominent local landowner, (the son of William Cox) also built a residence in the area. He called it Glenmore. Built in 1825, Cox's residence has since lent its name to the modern locality.

The area's land stayed largely rural until the 1970s, when the first residential sub-divisions commenced. Initially, the locality was known as "Peachtree" but Penrith Council later adopted the more historical-sounding Glenmore Park.

== Transport ==
Glenmore Parkway is the main road in the suburb. It connects with the Northern Road which in turn provides connection with both Penrith and the M4 Western Motorway. The M4 provides quick connection to greater Sydney and the Blue Mountains. Busways provides three bus services in the area which connect Glenmore Park with Penrith. The 797 bus travels via Mulgoa Road and Floribunda Avenue, before arriving at Glenmore Park Shops and then looping around Surveyors Creek Road and The Lakes Drive, while the 799 bus travels via Mulgoa Road and Alison Drive, before arriving at Glenmore Park Shops, followed by a short trip around Shearwater Drive and Ridgetop Drive to St Andrews Drive, before returning the same way. A 2008 report in the Sydney Morning Herald described the suburb as "designed without consideration of public transport". According to the 2016 census 78.3% of residents travelled to work by car, 3.1% worked at home and 10% by public transport. In the 2021 census this figure was 1.8% via public transport, 30.2% working at home and 51.7% who drove, this figure may be higher than normal working at home because of the COVID-19 pandemic in New South Wales.

== Education ==
Glenmore Park has five primary schools, two high schools, and a special education school.

- Primary Schools
  - Glenmore Park Public School
  - Surveyors Creek Public School
  - Bethany Catholic Primary School
  - Regentville Public School
  - Nangamay Public School
- High Schools
  - Glenmore Park High School
  - Caroline Chisholm College

Bethany and Caroline Chisholm are owned and managed by the Catholic Education Diocese of Parramatta.

Fernhill School (established in 2017) is a K-12 school for students who have moderate to severe intellectual and physical disabilities.

== People ==
=== Demographics ===
According to the 2021 census, there were 25,021 people in Glenmore Park.

- Aboriginal and Torres Strait Islander people made up 3.7% of the population.
- 76.2% of people were born in Australia. The next most common countries of birth were India 3.6%, England 2.9%, Philippines 1.9%, New Zealand 1.3% and South Africa 0.6%.
- 80.7% of people only spoke English at home. Other languages spoken at home included Punjabi 2.5%, Arabic 1.4%, Hindi 1.0%, Tagalog 0.9% and Mandarin 0.7%.
- The most common responses for religion were Catholic 32.9%, No Religion 27.7%, Anglican 15.9% and Hinduism 2.6%; a further 3.3% of respondents elected not to disclose their religion.

The residents are primarily young families living in detached houses. The median age of people in the suburb was 34, younger than the national median of 38. 57.6% were couples with children compared to the national average of 43.7%. Of the occupied private dwellings in Glenmore Park, 90.6% were separate houses, 7.4% were semi-detached and 2.0% were flats or apartments. Most dwellings were owned with a mortgage (53.4%) rather than owned outright (22.8%) or rented (22.7%). The median household income ($2,526 per week) was substantially higher than the national median ($1,746).

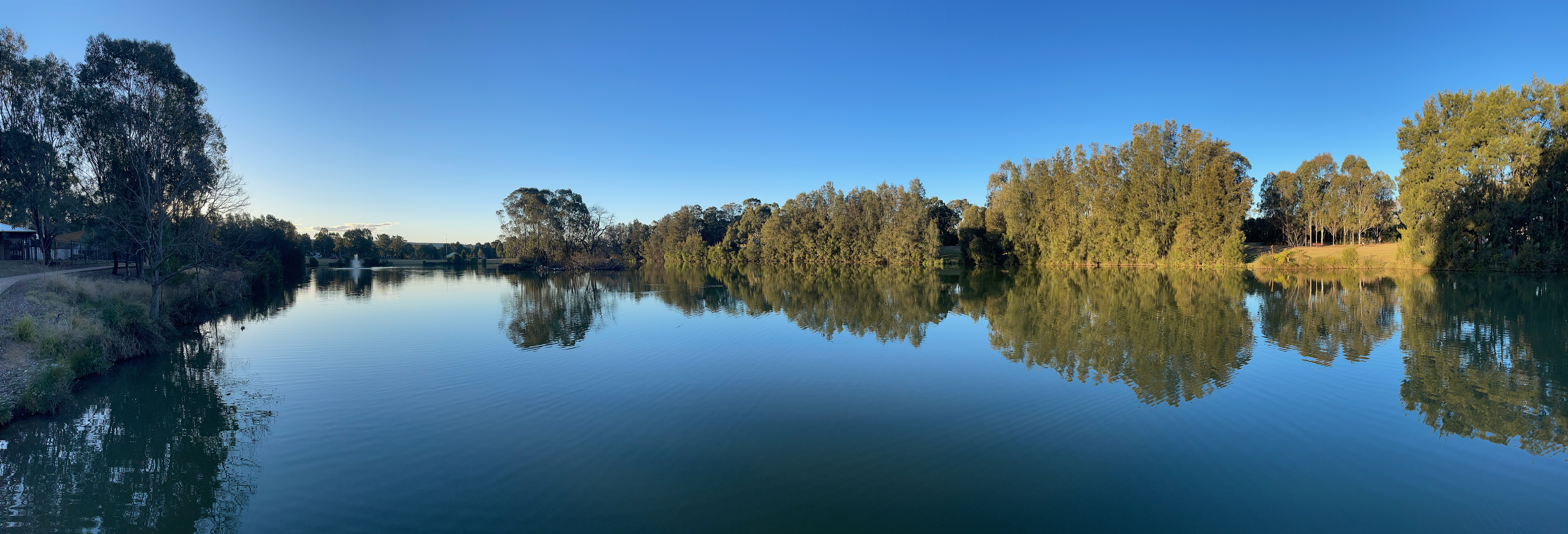
Glenmore Loch, Glenmore Park

As such, the population is typically local families, many of whom are home-owners or aspiring home-owners. Suburbs like Glenmore Park are often considered part of the mortgage belt of Western Sydney. There are some units and semi-detached houses in the shopping centre area, though the majority are detached with reasonable size house blocks, well kept gardens and abundant mature native trees.

== Governance ==
=== Local Government ===
Glenmore Park is located in South Ward of Penrith City Council. In 2024, the following councillors were elected to represent South Ward: Sue Day (IND), Vanessa Pollack (LP), Hollie McLean (ALP), Faithe Skinner (IND), and Kirstie Boerst (ALP). The Liberal Party failed to successfully nominate any candidates for the South Ward of Penrith in 2024, and thus were not on the ballot.

=== State Government ===
Glenmore Park is located in the electorate of Badgerys Creek. Tanya Davies MP (Lib) was elected to represent the electorate in 2023.

=== Federal Government ===
Glenmore Park is located in the electorate of Lindsay. The current member is Melissa McIntosh (Lib). She was elected at the 2019 Australian federal election.

== Sport ==
=== Rugby League ===
Glenmore Park's rugby league club is the Glenmore Park Brumbies. They play home games at Ched Towns Reserve (Like all other Glenmore Park-based sports clubs), and play in the colours white, maroon and gold. Their logo is based on an old Brisbane Broncos logo.

=== Football (Soccer) ===
Glenmore Park's football club is Glenmore Park FC. They play in purple, yellow and white. They are the largest football club in the Nepean district as administered by the Nepean Football Association.

=== Cricket ===
Glenmore Park's cricket club is the Glenmore Park Cricket Club. They play in black pants and a silver shirt.

=== Netball ===
Glenmore Park’s Netball club is the Glenmore Park Netball Club. They play in green, blue. They play in the Penrith District Netball Association.
