= Margaret Dawson =

Convict on the First Fleet

- Born: c. 1770; Liverpool, England
- Died: 16 February 1816 (aged 45–46); Westminster St James, Middlesex, England
- Criminal charges: grand larceny (1786)
- Criminal penalty: Death (commuted); 7 years transportation
- Partner: William Balmain
- Children: 4

Margaret Dawson (c. 1770 – 16 February 1816), also known as Margaret Henderson, was a convict sentenced to transportation. She travelled on the Lady Penrhyn as a member of the First Fleet to establish a British colony in Australia. She had a long-term relationship with the surgeon, William Balmain, whose descendants still live in Australia.

== Theft and conviction ==
She came from Liverpool and was employed in London as a servant for Joseph and Frances Shetley. On the afternoon of Sunday, 12 February 1786, while her employers were away, Dawson collected a large quantity of clothing, jewellery, and money, and left the house. When Mrs Shetley returned home, she found the house in disorder and servant girl missing. Joseph Shetley, set out to follow Dawson, knowing she came from the Liverpool area, he asked after her at the Golden Cross at Charing Cross and was told that a girl of her description had boarded the coach for Chester. Shetley took a postchaise with a Mr Lowe, and overtook the coach at St Albans. Dawson was apprehended, and taken to a local Inn where she handed over the stolen goods from her pockets and two boxes. The goods were recognised by Shetley, only item missing being a guinea coin, used to pay for the coach. When asked if she had acted with an accomplice or was travelling with anyone, she said she wasn't.

At her trial at the Old Bailey on 22 February 1786 for "feloniously stealing" goods to the value of £12 4s 1d, Mr Lowe stated that she was so changed in appearance that he would not have recognised her. In her defence, Dawson said "I have nothing to say, I have no witnesses." She was found guilty and sentenced to the mandatory of death. The prosecutor and jury recommended mercy on account of her youth, being only fifteen, and it being her first offence.

After ten months in Newgate Prison, Dawson was returned to court. Here, on 4 January 1787, her death sentence was commuted "on condition of being transported for [a term of seven years], to the Eastern coast of New South Wales, or some one or other of the islands adjacent".

== New South Wales ==
In January 1787, Dawson was delivered from Newgate to Lady Penrhyn, then moored in the River Thames. Arthur Phillip, the commander of the expedition, in a letter to Under Secretary Evan Nepean, complained of the condition that the convicts were delivered to the transports:

The situation in which the magistrates sent the women on board the Lady Penrhyn stamps them with infamy – tho' almost naked, and so very filthy, that nothing but clothing them could have prevented them from perishing…there are many venereal complaints, that must be spread in spite of every precaution I may take hereafter…

Lady Penrhyn rendezvous with the ten other ships that was to make up the First Fleet at Portsmouth. On 13 May 1787, the Fleet embarked on the eight month voyage, arriving at Botany Bay, 20 January 1788. Governor Phillip decided that this site wasn’t suitable so the fleet moved to Sydney Cove in Port Jackson on 26 January 1788. The female convicts stayed onboard the transports while the land was cleared and the camp was set up, finally getting ashore on 6 February.

On 11 August 1789 John Hayes received fifty lashes in a for his "infamous Behaviour" towards Dawson. In November 1791, Dawson travelled on Atlantic to settle at Norfolk Island, also on the ship was William Balmain, the new assistant surgeon of the island, whom Dawson cohabited with.

In December 1794 the principal surgeon, John White, returned to England on leave, and in August 1795 Balmain moved to Sydney to act in his place, Dawson and her children travelled with him, when White decided resign, Balmain was appointed principal surgeon in August 1796.

== Return to England ==
The family left Sydney in August 1801, and arrived in London in March 1802, an absence for Dawson of just under fifteen years. In May 1803 Dawson, now pregnant again with their fourth child, and the children, were sent to Ormskirk, near Liverpool.

On 17 November 1803 William Balmain died. In his will, dated four days before his death, he left a yearly sum of £50 to "my dear friend Margaret Dawson, otherwise Henderson ... whose tenderness to me, while in ill health, claims my warmest gratitude and by whom I have had two natural children … and who is now ensient".

No doubt due to her convict status, in contrast to Balmain's professional position, he felt unable to marry her. She and her children had taken the surname 'Henderson", which was Balmain's mother's maiden name.

Dawson left Ormskirk and gave birth to the fourth child in London. Little is known of this baby, except that it was a girl, and still living with the family at Clement's Inn in January 1807.

With a settled income of £50 a year, and rent from properties in New South Wales, it is unlikely that Dawson would have had to earn a living after Balmain's death. With the help of his friends she continued to encourage her son John William Henderson's education, and he eventually returned to New South Wales in January 1829 as a surgeon, like his father.

On 16 February 1816, while living at St James's, Westminster, Dawson died, and was buried in the churchyard of St-Giles-in-the-Fields, where Balmain had also been buried. Following her death, Balmain's executors paid £12 10s for her "last sickness and funeral expenses".
