= John George Nathaniel Gibbes =

British Army officer (1787–1873)

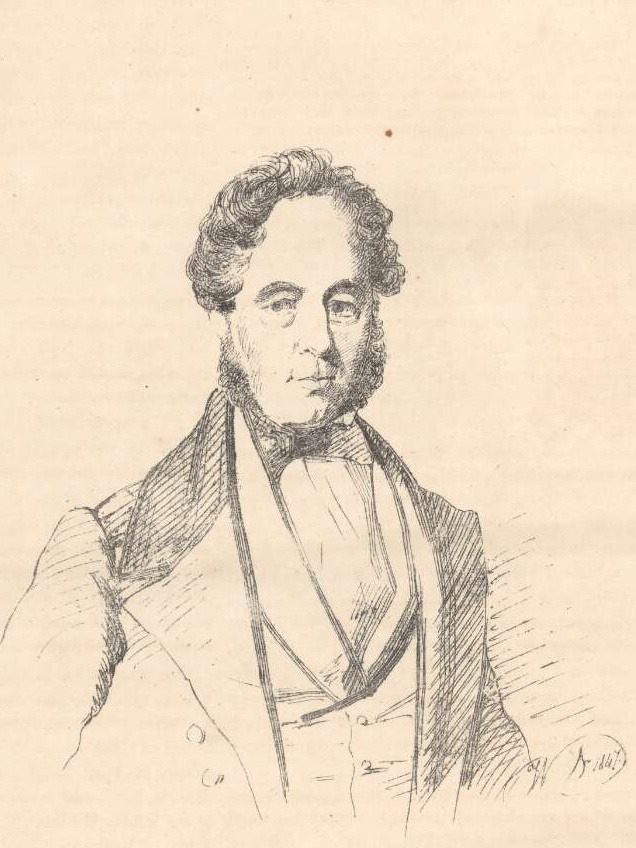
John George Nathaniel Gibbes

Colonel John George Nathaniel Gibbes (30 March 1787 – 5 December 1873) was a British army officer who emigrated to Australia in 1834 on his appointment as Collector of Customs for the Colony of New South Wales, an appointment which gave him a seat on the New South Wales Legislative Council and which he held for 25 years.

In his capacity as head of the New South Wales Department of Customs, Colonel Gibbes was the colonial government's principal accumulator of domestic-sourced revenue − prior to the huge economic stimulus provided by the Australian gold rushes of the 1850s − through the collection of import duties and other taxes liable on ship-borne cargoes. Thus, he played a significant role in the transformation of the City of Sydney (now Australia's biggest State capital) from a convict-based settlement into a prosperous, free enterprise-based port replete with essential government infrastructure.

Gibbes was forced to retire from the Council in 1855 and from his post as Collector of Customs for New South Wales in 1859. In 1844 he persuaded the Governor of NSW, Sir George Gipps, to begin construction of the Customs House, Sydney on Circular Quay in response to the port's growing volume of maritime trade. This major building project also doubled as an unemployment relief measure for stonemasons and laborers during an economic depression which was afflicting the colony at the time. The new Customs House replaced inadequate departmental accommodation for Gibbes and his team of officers in The Rocks area of Sydney.

Gibbes resided in a series of historically and architecturally important houses during his time in New South Wales, including the since demolished Palladian-style Point Piper House, Wotonga House (now part of Admiralty House on Kirribilli Point), Greycliffe House (overlooking Shark Beach in the Sydney suburb of Vaucluse), and after his disgrace Yarralumla Homestead (now the site of Australia's Government House, Canberra).

== Parentage and Education ==
Gibbes's parentage was long unknown. He was a bigamist about whom much was invented. The Australian Dictionary of Biography, I (1966) 439, said that he was 'born in London on 30 March 1787 the son of John Gibbes, planter, of Barbados and later of London. Rev. D. Geary contributed to his education in part in Dejether, North Wales', but the Dictionary provides no sources and these people (if they existed) cannot be identified. Gibbes is assumed to be the John Gibbs, born 30 March 1786 (sic), who appears without parentage in the published register of Merchant Taylors' School as having been educated in the school, 1795-99. A flattering piece published in Australia in 1847 said that he was born in London in 1787 'the son of the late John Gibbes (nephew of Sir Philip Gibbes, Bart, of Jackby, in Oxfordshire), formerly of Bardaboes, and afterwards of London but the Baronet had no nephew of that name.

Although Gibbes claimed to have married Elizabeth Davies in London in 1808, prior to the births of their first two children, as 'John Gibbes of St Paul, Covent Garden', he did not marry her, at St Andrew, Holborn, until 23 May 1814, and her parentage has not been ascertained. They had six further children, but whilst at Quebec, Canada, in 1818, Gibbes married there bigamously on 22 May 1818, to Mary Ann Bell, daughter of Matthew Bell (1769-184) a wealthy businessman. Apparently, he left her the following year and, not being prosecuted, returned to Elizabeth Davies. In a 'Journal in Retrospect' written around 1899 and based on his diaries, Stewart Marjoribanks Mowle (1822-1908), who knew Gibbes in Sydney and at Yarralumla in 1838-51, wrote of him as 'the reputed son of the Duke of York'. This belief took hold in Australia and in 1996 a descendant, Stephen Gibbes, wrote in the article just cited, that Gibbes's mother was Agnes Gibbes (1761-1843), the unmarried youngest daughter of Sir Philip Gibbes (1731-1815), and said that she met the Duke of York in Germany, he being in service on the Continent in 1786-7. Prime Minister Gough Whitlam took up and repeated the story in an address at the Old Parliament House in Canberra in 1994. However, the story lacked any contemporary sources.

In 2020 the theatre historian Terry Jenkins noted that Gibbes, his wife and son, were mentioned in the will of Mary or Maria Gibbs (born Mary Logan), the mistress of George Colman the Younger; however, when acting from the Spring of 1787 onwards, she called herself Mary or Maria Gibbs. She left her gold watch to her son Colonel Gibbes, her diamond snake ring to his wife Elizabeth, and her best gold chain to her grandson George Harvey Gibbes. She was the sister of the Duke of York's mistress Elizabeth or Eliza Cary or Carey. The identity of 'Mr Gibbs' remains unknown.

== Military service ==
Gibbes filled a vacancy with the 40th Regiment of Foot upon joining the army as an ensign in 1804 and was promoted to lieutenant the following year. He was made captain in the 4th Garrison Battalion in 1806 before transferring to the 85th Regiment of Foot in 1808 and then the 69th Regiment of Foot in 1811. He was granted brevet rank as major in 1819, as lieutenant-colonel in 1837 and colonel in 1851, retiring from the Army on 11 November that year. Early on, he participated in some fierce fighting during the wars against Napoleon and the French Emperor's allies. He saw action firstly in South America, where he participated in the siege and capture of the fortified city of Montevideo and the follow-up assault on Buenos Aires, which degenerated into a savage sequence of street-fight battles between the British redcoats and the ultimately victorious Spanish defenders of the city.

In 1809, Captain Gibbes was called in from staff officer duties in Southern England to take part in the Walcheren campaign, but an alarming number of British soldiers collapsed and died in their camps from a virulent form of malarial fever that they had contracted after the bombardment and capture of the strategic town of Flushing. Gibbes was one of the disease's victims. He was evacuated back to England to recuperate on half-pay. Once Gibbes had recovered his health sufficiently, he was reinstated to the army's active-service list, and served as a staff officer at stations, chiefly in Berkshire and Yorkshire, obtaining the rank of brigade major. In 1815, following Waterloo, Gibbes went back on the half-pay list and it was during this period that he contracted a bigamous marriage in Quebec with the daughter of a Canadian industrialist named Matthew Bell.

== Customs service ==
In 1819, Gibbes was appointed Collector of Customs at the wealthy Caribbean sugar port of Falmouth, Jamaica, and served there until 1827, drawing a salary of about £1500. While in Jamaica, Gibbes and his growing family lived in a plantation house inland from the town of Falmouth, where census returns show him owning livestock and several slaves. Gibbes enjoyed life in the West Indies but ill-health, probably a recurrence of malaria brought on by Jamaica's tropical climate, forced him to leave the island in 1827.

Back in England the family lived for a short time at Fulham Lodge in West London which had formerly belonged to a mistress of the Duke of York and Albany. From here he applied successfully to the Board of Customs for a transfer to the collectorship at the North Sea trading and fishing port of Great Yarmouth in Norfolk. He occupied this post until 1833, working to improve the physical conditions and work practices at what he discovered, on arrival, to be a somewhat rundown red-brick customs house on Great Yarmouth's main quay. He strengthened, too, the law-enforcement partnership which existed with the naval coast guard, to counteract smuggling along 'his' section of the Norfolk-Suffolk coast. In 1831, he and Mrs Gibbes saw their eldest child, George Harvey Gibbes, married to a local East Anglian girl.

Nonetheless, Gibbes decided to leave England permanently and in 1833 the Board of Customs accepted his application for the well-paid post of Collector of Customs at the Port of Sydney in the Colony of New South Wales agreeing to an exchange arrangement with his counterpart there. As Collector of Customs he had a seat on the Legislative Council and soon after his arrival in Sydney on the Resource on 19 April 1834, he was sworn in by Governor Richard Bourke. As a Legislative Councillor, he served on a number of maritime-related boards and parliamentary committees, his most important contribution being to recommend the introduction of gaslight into Sydney. The subsequent establishment of the Australian Gas Light Company at Darling Harbour during the 1840s transformed the lifestyle of Sydney's 19th-century residents in terms of street-lighting and domestic illumination, and, later, gas cooking.

When Gibbes arrived in Sydney in 1834, he held the rank of major. In 1837, he was promoted to lieutenant-colonel and then to full colonel shortly before his retirement from the army in 1851. Initially, he and his family leased Henrietta Villa, also known as the Naval Villa, on Sydney's scenic Point Piper. In 1843–44, they moved to "Wotonga", a stone house designed and erected by Gibbes on Kirribilli Point and now forming part of Admiralty House. (Point Piper House was torn down in the 1850s and the site redeveloped.)

Physically, Colonel Gibbes was a compact, spare person with grey eyes and receding light brown hair. He looked taller than he was because he walked with an erect military carriage. However, the burdens of public office increasingly irked the Colonel and he sometimes became prone to angry outbursts. The Australian Dictionary of Biography said of him:

"As collector of Customs at a salary of £1000 Gibbes found his department inadequate to cope with the growing demand of shipping and trade and he constantly appealed for more and better paid staff. He carried out his duties with more zeal than discretion and, when his suspicions were aroused [about possible smuggling activity], he seized whole cargoes which often led to tedious litigation. His accounts were always confused because of inefficient clerks and often showed him liable for surcharges which were removed only after long and acrimonious correspondence with the Board of Customs in London. All these irritations frayed his temper and he gained a reputation for irascibility."

By 1859 his department was long a reproach and a bye-word and in that year his son William John Gibbes (1815-1868), a bankrupt and notorious libertine with a number of illegitimate children, whose debts exceeded £20,000, was convicted of conspiring to defraud the Customs and sentenced to two years imprisonment. Following a Board of Inquiry into the fraud the Executive Council directed that Colonel Gibbes 'be called upon to show cause why he should not be discharged from his office of Collector of Customs for neglect of duty'. Gibbes then retired in late 1859 to Yarralumla, which had been bought in 1837 by his son-in-law Sir Terence Aubrey Murray.

== Admiralty House ==
Colonel Gibbes had begun work on Wotonga House in 1842 on the five-acre Kirribilli Point site, which he had leased Robert Campbell, before proceeding to buy it after Campbell's death. He completed the house-building project about a year later. Wotonga was a graceful single-storey house with wide verandahs and elegant French doors. Gibbes designed the house, which he called "Wotonga" (or "Woottonga"), himself. The stone for the house's walls was quarried locally and the hardwood and cedar joinery came from George Coleson's timber-yard in George Street, Sydney. Gibbes engaged James Hume, a well-known builder who dabbled in ecclesiastical architecture, to supervise the construction of the building and its stables. Gibbes, however, hired his own masons, bricklayers, carpenters, plumbers and ironmongers to work on the project, paying each of them separately as work progressed.

Colonel Gibbes used the Custom Department's cutter to commute to and from the building site. Once completed, Gibbes' L-shaped residence featured a plain, yet stylish, double façade to maximise the building's magnificent, sweeping views across Sydney Harbour. These views enabled Gibbes to monitor shipping traffic in and out of Darling Harbour and, more importantly, Circular Quay, where the Sydney Customs House was situated.

In 1849, Robert Campbell died and the executors of the estate sold the property, comprising the house and 5 acres (20,000 m^{2}) land, to Colonel Gibbes for about 1,400 pounds. On 27 December 1851, Gibbes (who was contemplating a departure from the Customs Service at the age of 64), sold the property to James Lindsay Travers, a merchant of Macquarie Place, Sydney, for 1,533 pounds.

Colonel Gibbes subsequently changed his mind about leaving his position as head of the NSW Customs Department; instead, he leased Greycliffe House at Shark Beach, Vaucluse, from the Wentworth family and remained in Sydney for the better part of eight years. Greycliffe is now listed by the government as one of the Heritage homes of Sydney.

Today, Wotonga forms the core of Admiralty House and the building's 180-degree, east-west panoramic sight-lines are even more spectacular than they were in Gibbes' day, owing to the subsequent high-rise growth of Sydney's CBD.

A portrait of Colonel Gibbes, painted in 1808 when he was a redcoat captain service on the personal staff of William Craven, 1st Earl of Craven (1770–1825), now hangs in Admiralty House.

== New South Wales Customs Service ==
Colonel Gibbes took up a commission in 1819 as the Collector of Customs for Falmouth, Jamaica, but remained on the army's half-pay list, which meant that he could be recalled to active service in times of war. Then, from 1827 to 1833, he held the equivalent position of Collector in the major East Anglian port of Great Yarmouth. In 1833, Colonel Gibbes exchanged positions with Michael Cotton who was the Collector of Customs for New South Wales. He arrived in Sydney the following year to take up the post. He served as Collector of Customs for New South Wales for a record term of 25 years, from 1834 until 1859. He was forced to retire from the Customs Service when his libertine of a second son, William John Gibbes, became embroiled in a smuggling scandal.

Earlier, in 1844, Colonel Gibbes had persuaded the then Governor of NSW, Sir George Gipps, to begin construction of the Customs House on Circular Quay in response to Sydney's growing volume of maritime trade. The building project also doubled as an unemployment relief measure for stonemasons and laborers during an economic depression which was afflicting the colony at the time. The original sandstone edifice of the Customs House on Circular Quay remains as the core of a subsequently enlarged edifice on the site.

As we have seen, Gibbes lived by the water at Kirribilli Point, on Sydney's northern shore. The Customs Service in the 1840s had an important link with Kirribilli, because the locale afforded panoramic views of Circular Quay and shipping movements on Sydney Harbour's main channel. It was therefore no coincidence that both Colonel Gibbes and his departmental deputy and personal friend, Thomas Jeffrey, elected to live in Kirribilli. The Customs Department's flagstaff, for instance, was located on Thomas Jeffrey's house, serving as a key maritime marker for mercantile vessels.

Colonel Gibbes also had an interesting connection in his later years to Henry Parkes, known as the "father" of Australia's Federation as a unified nation in 1901 and five times Premiere of New South Wales. About a year after Parkes arrival in Sydney, he was hired by the New South Wales Customs Department as a Tide Waiter, and given the task by Colonel Gibbes of inspecting merchant vessels in the port of Sydney to guard against the importation of contraband. He had been recommended for this responsible post by Sir John Jamison's son-in-law, William John Gibbes, who was manager of Sir John's Regentville estate, and the third-born offspring of Colonel Gibbes. Parkes left the employ of the Customs Department during the 1840s and went into the newspaper industry and, later, the political arena; but he remained on friendly terms with the Gibbes family for the rest of his life.

== Retirement ==
On retirement, Colonel Gibbes and Mrs Gibbes moved to Yarralumla homestead, now the official Canberra residence of the Governor-General of Australia, in late 1859. Yarralumla was owned from 1859 to 1881 by the Colonel's youngest child, Augustus Onslow Manby Gibbes.

Incidentally, the Colonel's second daughter, Mary, had married the prominent New South Wales parliamentarian, Sir Terence Aubrey Murray (1810–1873) who had purchased Yarralumla in 1837. In July 1859, he sold the property to his brother-in-law Augustus Onslow Manby "Gussie" Gibbes (who had been managing Yarralumla on Murray's behalf for the past four years).

== Death and Burial ==
Colonel Gibbes and his wife Elizabeth (known affectionately as Eliza or Betsy) lived to advanced ages by 19th-century standards. Their final years were clouded by various age-related health problems, and they died at Yarralumla homestead in 1873 and 1874 respectively. They were buried initially in a family vault at Yarralumla but, in 1880, their son Augustus moved their remains to the graveyard at the St John the Baptist Church, Reid, where they were re-interred under an inscribed marble headstone which still stands. Interred with him and his wife are the remains of his son Augustus Gibbes, his grandson Henry Gibbes, and his great-grandson Wing-Commander Robert "Bobby" Gibbes. Two stained-glass windows, dedicated to their memories and bearing the Gibbes coat of arms, were also erected in the nave of the church.

== Offspring ==
The Colonel and Mrs Gibbes had eight children, born in the 1809–1828 period. All of them migrated to Sydney with their parents except for the eldest, George Harvey Gibbes (1809–1883), who remained in London and became a senior bureaucrat with the British War Office. They were:

=== George Harvey Gibbes (1809–1883) ===
Unlike his seven siblings, George remained in England. He was born at Kirk Ella, Yorkshire. He entered the British Public Service at the age of 18, being appointed to the personal staff of the Duke of Wellington in London. He rose subsequently through the bureaucratic ranks at Horse Guards (the headquarters of the Commander-in-Chief of the British Army) and the War Office in Whitehall. In 1869, he retired on an annual half-pay pension from his £1300 per annum position of Assistant Military Secretary. He had wed Mary Ann Fuller (1811–1896) at Gorleston, Norfolk, in 1831. They spent their married life living in London (in the suburbs of Chelsea and Belgravia) and at a holiday house in Ryde on the Isle of Wight. There were no children of the marriage.

=== Eliza Julia Gibbes (1811–1892) ===
The eldest daughter of the family as born in the naval and military port of Gosport, Hampshire. As a girl, according to her own account, she worked in an unofficial capacity for Queen Adelaide. In Sydney in 1837, she married Robert Dulhunty (1802–1853), an English-born grazier and Police Magistrate who owned Claremont, near Penrith, NSW. During the 1840s, Dulhunty and his family pioneered the Dubbo region of central-western NSW. Dulhunty died at Old Dubbo Station at the age of 51, leaving Eliza to bring up their large brood of children and run their portfolio of rural properties, many of which were lost to the banks due to the adverse effects of drought and economic recessions. Eliza died in hospital in the NSW town of Bathurst and is buried in the local cemetery.

=== William John Gibbes (1815–1868) ===
Colonel Gibbes' second son was William John Gibbes (1815–1868), who had been born in the English garrison City of York. In 1837, William John married Harriet Eliza Jamison in the Anglican Church of St James, Sydney.

Harriet's father was Sir John Jamison (1776 – 29 June 1844), an important Australian physician, pastoralist, banker, politician, constitutional reformer and public figure. Sir John fathered a number of illegitimate children by several mistresses.

Her mother (one of Sir John's mistresses), Catherine Cain(e), the convict 'housekeeper' assigned to him at his Sydney residence. Catherine gave birth to a daughter by Sir John, Harriet Eliza Jamison, in 1819.

Harriet grew up to be a cultivated and pious young woman. In 1837, she married into the colonial establishment when she wed William John Gibbes. The wedding took place at St James' Anglican Church, Sydney, in the presence of the governor. Harriet died in Sydney in 1896. By this stage, she had seen her three children, all sons, carve out successful careers for themselves in the political, legal and sporting/civil-service sectors of Sydney society.

William John Gibbes, incidentally, lived with his wife at Regentville House, near Penrith, New South Wales, following his marriage. Later, in the second half of the 1840s, he lived in Beulah House at Kirribilli, before moving to Camden Villa in the then Sydney garden-suburb of Newtown in the early 1850s. Beulah was later lived in by the Riley and Lasseter families. Regrettably, this elegant sandstone residence was eventually demolished and its grounds subdivided into numerous residential blocks which were auctioned off by developers in 1905.

William became a notorious libertine who sired a number of illegitimate children. He spent the 1850s in a state of bankruptcy with debts exceeding £20,000. William was convicted (in the NSW Supreme Court) of a smuggling charge in 1859 and sentenced to two years imprisonment at Parramatta Gaol in Sydney. Subsequently, he lived in Melbourne and East Sydney. He died at the latter location of a blood disorder, aged 52. William was estranged from his wife at the time of his passing, and the two lived separately. He lies buried in the Old Balmain Cemetery (now Pioneers' Park, in the Sydney suburb of Leichhardt.

=== Mary "Minnie" Gibbes (1817–1858) ===
Mary, known affectionately as Minnie, was born in the garrison town of Pontefract, Yorkshire. She later married the prominent Irish-born Australian parliamentarian and grazier Sir Terence Aubrey Murray (1810–1873). Murray was the proprietor of Winderradeen sheep station near Lake George, NSW. He also purchased 'Yarralumla sheep station, in what is now Canberra, in 1837. Yarralumla subsequently became Government House, Canberra. Mary's health was frail, and she died at Winderradeen at the start of 1858, following the birth of her third surviving child. She is buried in the grounds of the homestead.

In 1859, Murray sold Yarralumla to his brother-in-law, Augustus Onslow Manby Gibbes. Later that same year, Augustus' parents came to live with him at Yarralumla homestead. Eventually, in 1881, Augustus sold Yarralumla for 40,000 pounds to Frederick Campbell, a descendant of Robert Campbell.

=== Frances "Fanny" Minto Gibbes (1822/23–1877) ===
Frances "Fanny" Minto Gibbes (1822/23–1877) was born in Trelawney Parish on the north coast of the West Indies island of Jamaica during her father's term there as Collector of Customs for the port of Falmouth. In Sydney, in 1850, she married Alfred Ludlam (1810–1877). Irish-born Ludlam was a leading New Zealand politician, horticulturist and farmer who owned land at Wellington and in the Hutt Valley. Ludlam was a member of three of New Zealand's four earliest parliaments, he was also a philanthropist and a founder of Wellington's Botanic Garden.

Ludlam was a periodic visitor to NSW. The main reason for these trans-Tasman Sea visits of Ludlam's was to do business in Sydney, which served as New South Wales' principal trading port, population centre and seat of government; but he also found time to socialise. On 1 October 1850, he married into Sydney's colonial establishment with his wedding to Fanny Gibbes. His wedding took place at St Thomas' Anglican Church (in what is today the North Sydney local government area).

Fanny was living with her parents at Wotonga House—nowadays part of Admiralty House complex on Sydney's Kirribilli Point—at the time of her marriage to Ludlam. She and her husband spent their honeymoon relaxing at the New South Wales country property of Yarralumla (now the site of Australia's Government House in Canberra), which at that stage belonged to Fanny's brother-in-law, (Sir) Terence Aubrey Murray. During the 1870s, Fanny and her husband holidayed in London, taking a house at Maida Vale. Fanny fell fatally ill there with an intestinal blockage and was buried in London. Her husband returned to New Zealand, dying in Wellington later that same year (1877) of kidney disease. They had no children.

=== Edmund Minto Gibbes (1824–1850) ===
Like his sister Fanny, Edmund was born on Jamaica. After his arrival in Sydney, he was educated with his brother Augustus at Sydney College. He worked for his father as a NSW Customs Department officer in Sydney and at the whaling port of Eden on the NSW South Coast. During the 1840s, he eloped with a wealthy Jewish teenager, Frances Simmons (1833–1910), scandalising colonial Sydney in the process. They had two children, both of whom died in infancy. Edmund belatedly wed Miss Simmons at Campbelltown, NSW, in 1849. He contracted pulmonary tuberculosis and sailed for England with his bride in 1850 to begin a fresh life. He died on the voyage and was buried at sea. Edmund's widow later married a London lawyer named Roger Gadsden and returned to Sydney to live.

=== Matilda Lavinia Gibbes (1826–1916) ===
Matilda was the third and last child to be born during her father's collectorship at the port of Falmouth, Jamaica. She was born at Brompton on 13 March 1826. She spent her infancy in Norfolk and came to Sydney at the age of seven. In 1858, she married Augustus Berney (1831–1910). Her husband was an officer in the Sydney Customs Department and the heir to landed estates in Norfolk, including Morton Hall and Bracon Ash. They had four children, one of whom died in infancy, and lived in the Sydney suburb of Darlinghurst. In 1896, Matilda's husband inherited his family properties in Norfolk and the family returned there to live. Matilda died at Bracon Ash house, aged 90, during the height of World War I and is buried locally in the Berney family mausoleum.

=== Augustus Onslow Manby Gibbes (1828–1897) ===
Augustus, nicknamed "Gussie", was the youngest child. He was born in Great Yarmouth, Norfolk. His godfathers were George William Manby and Captain John Onslow, RN. He became a large-scale sheep farmer and horse breeder in rural New South Wales, owning the Yarralumla estate from 1859 to 1881. He then travelled overseas for a decade before settling down on a farming property named Braemar, near the town of Goulburn, New South Wales, in the early 1890s, with his wife and their four surviving children, all sons. His wife, Annie Bartram (1865–1914) came from the City of Bath in England The two had met in the mid-1880s, entering into a relationship and touring around the United Kingdom. Augustus, however, did not officially marry her until 1896 (at Penrith, NSW). The following year, he died at Braemar House after suffering a stroke and was buried with his parents in Canberra.

== Norfolk friends ==
Members of the Berney family of landed gentry were close associates of the Gibbes' during their time in Norfolk. Indeed, the two families later inter-married. Another friend of the Gibbes' in Great Yarmouth was George William Manby, who became one of the godfathers of Augustus Onslow Manby Gibbes (1828–1897). Manby was a well-known inventor and a member of England's Royal Society.

== Great grandson — Bobby Gibbes ==
One of the numerous great-grandsons of Colonel Gibbes was Bobby Gibbes DSO, DFC & Bar, OAM (6 May 1916 – 11 April 2007) who was a leading Australian fighter ace of World War II.

He was officially credited with shooting down 10¼ enemy aircraft, although his score is often reported as 12 destroyed.
