= Glenmore Park High School =

Location
- Glenmore Parkway, Glenmore Park, Western Sydney, New South Wales; Australia; 33°47′29″S 150°40′20″E

Information
- Type: Public
- Established: 1998
- Principal: Lisette Gorick
- Enrolment: 1,020 (2022–2023)
- Houses: Bradman; Fraser; O'Neill; Sauvage
- Website: glenmorepk-h.schools.nsw.gov.au

Glenmore Park High School (abbreviated as GPHS) is a public high school, located in the suburb of Glenmore Park in the local government area of Penrith, New South Wales.

The current principal of Glenmore park High School is Lisette Gorick. There approximately 1,020 students who attend Glenmore Park High School. GPHS caters to all types and levels of high school education.
