= Michael Cotton =

Australian politician

Member of New South Wales Legislative Council
- In office 30 January 1829 – 30 April 1834

Collector of Customs
- In office 1828–1834
- Preceded by: John Campbell
- Succeeded by: John George Nathaniel Gibbes

Personal details
- Born: Michael Cullen Cotton
- Spouse(s): Jane Mary Weller; Married 19 April 1836

Michael Cullen Cotton was a politician in the New South Wales Legislative Assembly during the early colonial period.

Cotton served as collector of customs from 1828 to 1834 replacing John Campbell. In 1829, he became a member of the newly extended Legislative Council. In 1833, he exchanged positions with John George Nathaniel Gibbes who was the Collector of Customs in the major East Anglian port of Great Yarmouth.

On 19 April 1836 he married Jane Mary Weller at St John's, Hamstead.
