= John Thomas Campbell =

Australian public servant and politician

John Campbell

Member of New South Wales Legislative Council
- In office 30 January 1829 – 7 January 1830

Collector of Customs
- In office 5 Apr 1827 – December 1827
- Preceded by: John Piper
- Succeeded by: Michael Cotton

Personal details
- Born: John Thomas Campbell; 8 April 1770 Ulster, Ireland
- Died: 7 January 1830 (aged 59) Sydney, New South Wales, Australia

John Thomas Campbell (1770–1830) was a public servant and politician in the New South Wales Legislative Council during the early Australian colonial period.

== Early life ==
Campbell was born in Ulster, Kingdom of Ireland in 1770. He was eldest son of Reverend William Campbell, vicar of Newry, County Armagh, Ireland, and his wife Mary Campbell (née McCammon). He and his brothers were educated at home by his father. From 1793 to 1795, he worked at the newly formed Bank of Ireland.

== Vice-regal secretary ==
After arriving in Sydney, Campbell, on 1 January 1810 was appointed to the role of vice-regal secretary to Governor Lachlan Macquarie. For eleven years he was Macquarie's chief assistant in the administration of the colony, his intimate friend and loyal supporter. He was paid £282 10s by the British government, to which Macquarie added £82 10s from the colonial revenue. He then served as Provost Marshal from 1820 until the office was abolished and a sheriff appointed in 1825.

Campbell took a leading part in the founding of the Bank of New South Wales from 1816 until 1817 and was appointed as the first president of the Board of Directors, serving until 1821. He was re-elected to the board in 1827 but resigned before taking his seat.

In 1821 he was treasurer of the committee in charge of building the first Catholic church in Sydney, St Mary's, although he was not himself a Catholic.

== Politics ==
In 1824, Governor Sir Thomas Brisbane suggested his name for appointment to the new Legislative Council. In 1826, Governor (Sir) Ralph Darling made him a member of the Land Board, and of the Board for General Purposes constituted to reorganize the administrative offices of government. In April 1827, Darling appointed him collector of customs as well, in place of John Piper, at a salary of £1200, but he resigned from this post in December. He was replaced by Michael Cotton. In 1829, he became a member of the newly extended Legislative Council and served in the role until his death.

== Private life ==
As a private citizen, Campbell was a large landholder and a most efficient farmer and breeder of cattle and horses. In 1811, Macquarie granted him 1,550 acres (627 ha) at Bringelly, and later he received a grant near Rooty Hill. He was also a large stock-holder in southern New South Wales.

He never married and had no children.

== Death ==
Campbell died in Sydney on 7 January 1830 at the age of 59.
