= Regentville =

- Suburb
- Interactive map of Regentville
- Country: Australia
- State: New South Wales
- City: Sydney
- LGA: Penrith City Council
- Location: 59 km (37 mi) west of Sydney CBD

Government
  - State electorate: Badgerys Creek
  - Federal division: Lindsay

Area
  - Total: 1.22 km^{2} (0.47 sq mi)
- Elevation: 30 m (98 ft)

Population
  - Total: 829 (2021 census)
  - Density: 680/km^{2} (1,760/sq mi)
- Postcode: 2745
Suburbs around Regentville
Emu Plains	Jamisontown	Jamisontown
Leonay	Regentville	Glenmore Park
Megalong Valley	Mulgoa	Mulgoa

Regentville is a suburb of Sydney, in the state of New South Wales, Australia. It is 56 kilometres west of the Sydney central business district, in the local government area of the City of Penrith, and is part of the Greater Western Sydney region. It is located on the eastern bank of the Nepean River, just south of Jamisontown.

== History ==
=== European settlement ===
Following the arrival of the First Fleet land was granted to British settlers by the colonial administration. The first land grant in this area was to the Irish-born Surgeon-General of New South Wales, Thomas Jamison, who had arrived in 1788 aboard the Sirius. After Thomas' death in London in 1811, the land (at what is now Jamisontown) was taken up by his son, John, also a surgeon, who had served under Admiral Horatio Nelson at the Battle of Trafalgar, and was knighted for his medical services to the Royal Navy by the prince regent of the United Kingdom, later King George IV, in 1813.

Sir John Jamison arrived in Sydney in 1814 and progressively established himself during the ensuing two decades as one of the colony's biggest and wealthiest land owners. In 1823–24, he built a magnificent Georgian-style, sandstone mansion on a rise overlooking the Nepean River. He named the mansion Regentville House in honour of the Prince Regent. Sir John held so many lavish balls, banquets and other social activities at the mansion that he became known as the "hospitable knight of Regentville". He later erected a multi-storey tweed mill on his extensive estate and established a dairy, a thoroughbred horse stud, ornamental gardens, a cemetery, and a school for the children of his work force. Other parts of the estate were given over to an orchard, a terraced vineyard, and grazing paddocks for sheep and cattle.

Sir John died at Regentville House in 1844, aged 68, having lost much of his fortune in a severe economic downturn then afflicting the colony. He is buried in St Stephen's churchyard, Penrith. The Regentville estate passed to his children but the land was gradually sold off in chunks, following an acrimonious inheritance dispute. Regentville House was later turned into an asylum and then leased out as a hotel. Sadly, however, it burned down in suspicious circumstances in 1868. Today, only the house's cellars and drains survive, along with some meagre sections of its masonry walls. Sir John's tweed mill has disappeared, too, but the overgrown terracing of the estate's vineyard can still be discerned.

The area around the site of Regentville House has remained largely rural, if hemmed in somewhat by the modern residential suburbs of Jamisontown and Glenmore Park. It has been the subject of archaeological excavations undertaken by the University of Sydney and images of the house are extant in various public and private collections.

Regentville Post Office opened on 1 October 1953 and closed in 1979.

=== Heritage listings ===
Regentville has a number of heritage-listed sites, including:

- 427 Mulgoa Road: Glenleigh Estate

== Transport ==
Mulgoa Road is the main road in the suburb, connecting with both Penrith and the M4 Motorway which in turn provides quick connection to greater Sydney and the Blue Mountains. The nearest railway station is at Penrith on the Western Line of the Sydney Trains network. Busways provides three bus services in the area with the 799 connecting the majority of Regentville with both Glenmore Park and Penrith, while Route 797 and Route 795 travels along Mulgoa Road towards Glenmore Park and Warragamba/Wallacia respectively.

== Education ==
The only school in the suburb is Regentville Public School. The nearest high school is located in Glenmore Park.

== Population ==
=== Demographics ===
The recorded population of Regentville in the 2021 census was just 829. The majority of residents are Australian born (81.3%) with small minorities born in England (3.4%) and New Zealand (2.4%). The most common religious affiliation was No Religion (31.4%), lower than the national average of 38.4%, followed by Catholic (29.6%), Anglican (20.3%), Not stated (6.2%) and Christian, nfd (2.4%). The median income ($963 per week) was slightly higher than the national average ($805).

== Governance ==
At a local government level, Regentville is part of the south ward of Penrith City Council, represented by Jim Aitken, Mark Davies, Karen McKeown, Susan Page and Gary Rumble. The current mayor is Todd Carney. At the state governmental level, it is part of the Electoral district of Badgerys Creek, represented by Liberal Tanya Davies. Federally, it is part of the Division of Lindsay, represented by Liberal Melissa McIntosh.

== Regentville Rural Fire Brigade ==
Regentville Rural Fire Brigade is one of many Volunteer Fire Brigades located in New South Wales. The Brigade is a part of the NSW Rural Fire Service and was established in 1951. It currently has approximately 60 operationally active members. The brigade has 2 Category 1 Tankers, 1 Category 10 Pumper, a Boat and a Personnel Carrier.
