= John Reid (minister) =

19th-century Presbyterian minister active in Scotland, England and Australia

The Reverend John Reid
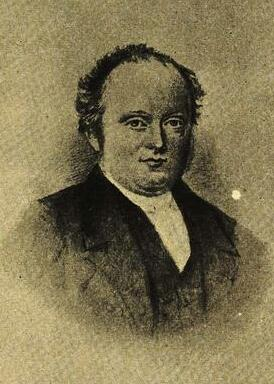
- Reid c. 1857
- Church: United Secession Church (1829–1833); Congregationalist (1833–1837); Auld Licht Burgher (1837–1839); Church of Scotland (1839–1857); Synod of New South Wales (1858–1862); Bethel Union (1862–1867)

Orders
- Ordination: 1829

Personal details
- Born: 1800 Tarbolton, Ayrshire, Scotland
- Died: 18 July 1867 (aged 66–67) Sydney, New South Wales, Australia
- Denomination: Presbyterianism
- Spouse: Marion Crybbace (m. 1834)
- Children: 7, inc. George
- Education: University of Edinburgh

John Reid (1800 – 18 July 1867) was a Presbyterian minister from Scotland who was also active in England and Australia. Born in Ayrshire, he was ordained into the United Secession Church in 1829, but later led independent and Burgher churches. He joined the established Church of Scotland in 1839 and, in 1845 took over an expatriate congregation in Liverpool, England. Reid immigrated to Australia in 1852, living in Melbourne until 1858 and then in Sydney. He left the Church of Scotland and for a while ministered in John Dunmore Lang's schismatic sect, eventually ending his career at a non-denominational Bethel Union congregation. His son George Reid became the fourth Prime Minister of Australia.

== Early life ==
Reid was born in Tarbolton, Ayrshire, Scotland, the son of Jean (née Ronald) and John Reid. His father owned a farm called The Burn near Crosshouse. Reid likely began his education at the parish school in Tarbolton. His parents were probably nonconformists, as the local kirk was part of the New Licht faction of the Anti-Burghers. At the age of 15, Reid began studying at the University of Edinburgh. He attended classes in arts and medicine between 1815 and 1818, but as was common at the time, did not graduate. In 1823, he entered the United Secession Theological Hall, an institution of the United Secession Church. He stayed there for three years and was taught by John Dick.

== Career in Scotland ==
Reid received a probationary licence to preach in April 1826 from the presbytery of Cupar, Fife. He was formally ordained by the United Secession Church in early 1829, and received offers from congregations in Glasgow (Nicholson Street) and Edinburgh (Cowgate). He rejected both offers, instead accepting a call from the small rural parish of Dalry in Dumfriesshire. In March 1833, Reid dramatically resigned his post, reading a brief statement instead of a sermon and then walking out of the church, "to the astonishment and grief of the whole congregation". He was suspended by the United Secession Church in May, and in July left the denomination altogether. The cause of his resignation was what he perceived as interference in his personal life.

After leaving Dalry, Reid moved to Edinburgh and took over the pulpit of an independent congregation, St Mary Magdalene's Chapel, which had been founded by his future brother-in-law Thomas Crybbace. In 1835, he switched to the United Christian Church, a small independent congregation in the Grassmarket district. The church lacked a building of its own, instead worshipping on the second floor of a factory. Reid was effectively an "urban missionary", working mostly with the poor. His stipend was only £50, a quarter of what he had been offered by the United Secession Church in 1829. In 1837, the church voted to join the Auld Licht Burghers, and they were formally received into the Original Burgher Synod the following year.

In 1839, Reid took over an Auld Licht congregation in Bathgate, Linlithgowshire. Shortly after his arrival, the sect voted to rejoin the established Church of Scotland, and the Bathgate congregation followed despite local opposition. In April 1841, Reid moved to Johnstone, Renfrewshire, where he stayed for four years; three of his children were born there. He remained loyal to the established church in the Disruption of 1843, despite his theology being closer to that of the breakaway Free Church of Scotland.

== Career in England ==
In April 1845, Reid moved to Liverpool, England, to take over the Scots Church on Oldham Street, a "prosperous expatriate congregation with its fair share of shipowners and merchants". It would be his longest single ministry, and his two youngest children were born there. In 1851, however, he decided to immigrate to Australia. According to his son George, this was because he had been diagnosed with bronchitis and was seeking a warmer climate. His congregation petitioned him to remain in Liverpool, and gifted him £100 for his services. After briefly returning to Scotland, Reid and his family left for Australia via Liverpool in December 1851. He ministered on board the ship Martin Luther, and 156 passengers signed a petition thanking him for his chaplaincy.

== Career in Australia ==
Reid arrived in Melbourne on 10 March 1852, and on 7 July took over the Second Scots Church, which met in a hall on Queen Street. He was transferred to St John's, Essendon, in April 1853, and then to a congregation in North Melbourne in March 1856, where he remained until February 1858. In August 1857, the congregation petitioned for admittance to the United Presbyterian Church of Victoria, which had broken away from the Church of Scotland over what they felt was the unfair distribution of state aid.

In early 1858, Reid moved to Sydney to become a minister in the schismatic Synod of New South Wales. A few years earlier he had come into contact with the synod's founder, John Dunmore Lang, who told him that he was seeking another Scottish-trained minister. Reid was soon elected moderator of the synod. He and Lang shared the preaching duties, while Lang dealt with marriages and public duties and Reid dealt with visitation. His wife established a ragged school in The Rocks.

Reid and Lang eventually fell out, although it has been noted that Reid lasted longer than many of Lang's previous colleagues. In May 1862, he accepted a position with Sydney's Bethel Union. He filled the positions of "seamen's chaplain" and minister of the nondenominational Mariners' Church in George Street. He was widely considered to have had a successful tenure, expanding the congregation, establishing a temperance society, and holding lecture series. Reid was readmitted into the Synod of Australia—the largest Presbyterian sect—in November 1863 as a minister-without-charge. He aspired to return to a rural parish, unsuccessfully applying for positions in Shoalhaven and Ipswich, Queensland. He died of cystitis on 18 July 1867 and was buried in Rookwood Cemetery.

== Personal life ==
On 10 July 1834, Reid married Marion Crybbace, the daughter of another Presbyterian minister Edward Crybbace. He had attended theological school with her brother Thomas. The couple had seven children together – John (b. 1836 in Edinburgh), William Ferguson (b. 1839 in Bathgate), Hugh Ronald (b. 1841 in Johnstone), Mark Watt (b. 1843 in Johnstone), George Houstoun (b. 1845 in Johnstone), and daughters Mary Eliza and Marion Jane (b. in Liverpool, dates uncertain). John, Hugh, and Mark went into the shipping industry, while William followed his father into the clergy. Marion married businessman James Ewan, the chairman of the Australasian Steam Navigation Company. George entered politics, eventually becoming the fourth Prime Minister of Australia. In his memoirs he said of his father, "When praise comes my way for anything that seems to be good in what I have done, I feel painfully sensible of my almost total failure to do justice to the good example which he set".
