= Jamisontown =

- Suburb
- Interactive map of Jamisontown
- Country: Australia
- State: New South Wales
- City: Sydney
- LGA: City of Penrith
- Location: 56 km (35 mi) W of Sydney; 49 km (30 mi) E of Katoomba

Government
  - State electorate: Penrith
  - Federal division: Lindsay

Area
  - Total: 8.14 km^{2} (3.14 sq mi)
- Elevation: 33 m (108 ft)

Population
  - Total: 5,321 (2021 census)
  - Density: 653.7/km^{2} (1,693.0/sq mi)
- Postcode: 2750
Suburbs around Jamisontown
| Emu Plains | Penrith | Penrith |
| Emu Plains | Jamisontown | South Penrith |
| Leonay | Regentville | Glenmore Park |

Jamisontown is a suburb of Sydney, in the state of New South Wales, Australia. It is 56 kilometres west of the Sydney central business district, in the local government area of the City of Penrith, and is part of the Greater Western Sydney region. It is on the eastern side of the Nepean River, just south of Penrith and bears the name of Thomas Jamison, a pioneer landowner and First Fleet surgeon.

== History ==
=== Aboriginal culture ===
Prior to European settlement, what is now Jamisontown was home to the Mulgoa people who spoke the Darug language. They lived a hunter-gatherer lifestyle governed by traditional laws, which had their origins in the Dreamtime. Their homes were bark huts called 'gunyahs'. They hunted kangaroos and emus for meat, and gathered sweet potatoes, berries and other native plants.

=== European settlement ===
In 1805, the then Surgeon-General (Principal Surgeon) of the Colony of New South Wales, Thomas Jamison (1752/53-1811), was granted 1,000 acres (4.0 km^{2}) on the banks of the Nepean River, to the south of what is now Jamison Road. Later, the property passed to his son, Sir John Jamison (1776–1844), Kt, MD, MLC - a celebrated physician, land owner and political reformer, who erected a splendid mansion (since destroyed by fire) on the nearby Regentville estate during the 1820s.

The land at Jamisontown stayed rural for the next 150 years or so. In 1911, it was the departure point for the first cross-country flight in Australia, made by William Ewart Hart. In the 1960s the area began to be subdivided and developed and in 1976, Jamisontown was officially gazetted as a neighbourhood.

Jamison Town Post Office opened on 10 May 1889 and closed in 1931.

== Transport ==
Mulgoa Road is the main road in the suburb, connecting with both Penrith and the M4 Western Motorway which in turn provides quick connection to greater Sydney and the Blue Mountains. The nearest railway station is at Penrith on the Western Line of the Sydney Trains network.

Busways provides three bus services in the area with route 791 connecting Jamisontown to Penrith, route 795 connecting to Penrith and Mulgoa, and route 797 connecting to Penrith and Glenmore Park.

== Local attractions ==
The Penrith Ice Palace is located in Jamisontown close to the river.

== Education ==
Jamisontown Public School is the only school in the suburb. Jamison High School is actually located in South Penrith.

== Population ==
=== Demographics ===
According to the 2021 census of Population, there were 5,321 people in Jamisontown.

- Aboriginal and Torres Strait Islander people made up 4.6% of the population.
- The most common ancestries were English 37.5%, Australian 37.3%, Irish 11.3%, Scottish 9.0% and Australian Aboriginal 4.1%.
- 75.5% of people were born in Australia. The next most common country of birth was England at 4.4%.
- 82.4% of people spoke only English at home.
- The most common responses for religion were No Religion 32.6%, Catholic 25.7% and Anglican 16.7%.

=== Notable residents ===
- Thomas Jamison (1745–1811), NSW surgeon-general and colonial landholder in Jamisontown.

== Governance ==
At a local government level, Jamisontown is part of the south ward of Penrith City Council, represented by Jim Aitken, Mark Davies, Karen McKeown, Susan Page and Gary Rumble. The current mayor is Pat Sheehy. At the state level, it is part of the Electoral district of Penrith, represented by Liberal Stuart Ayres. Federally, it is part of the Division of Lindsay, represented by Liberal Party Melissa McIntosh.
