= John Frazer (politician) =

Australian politician (1827–1884)

The Honourable John Frazer JP
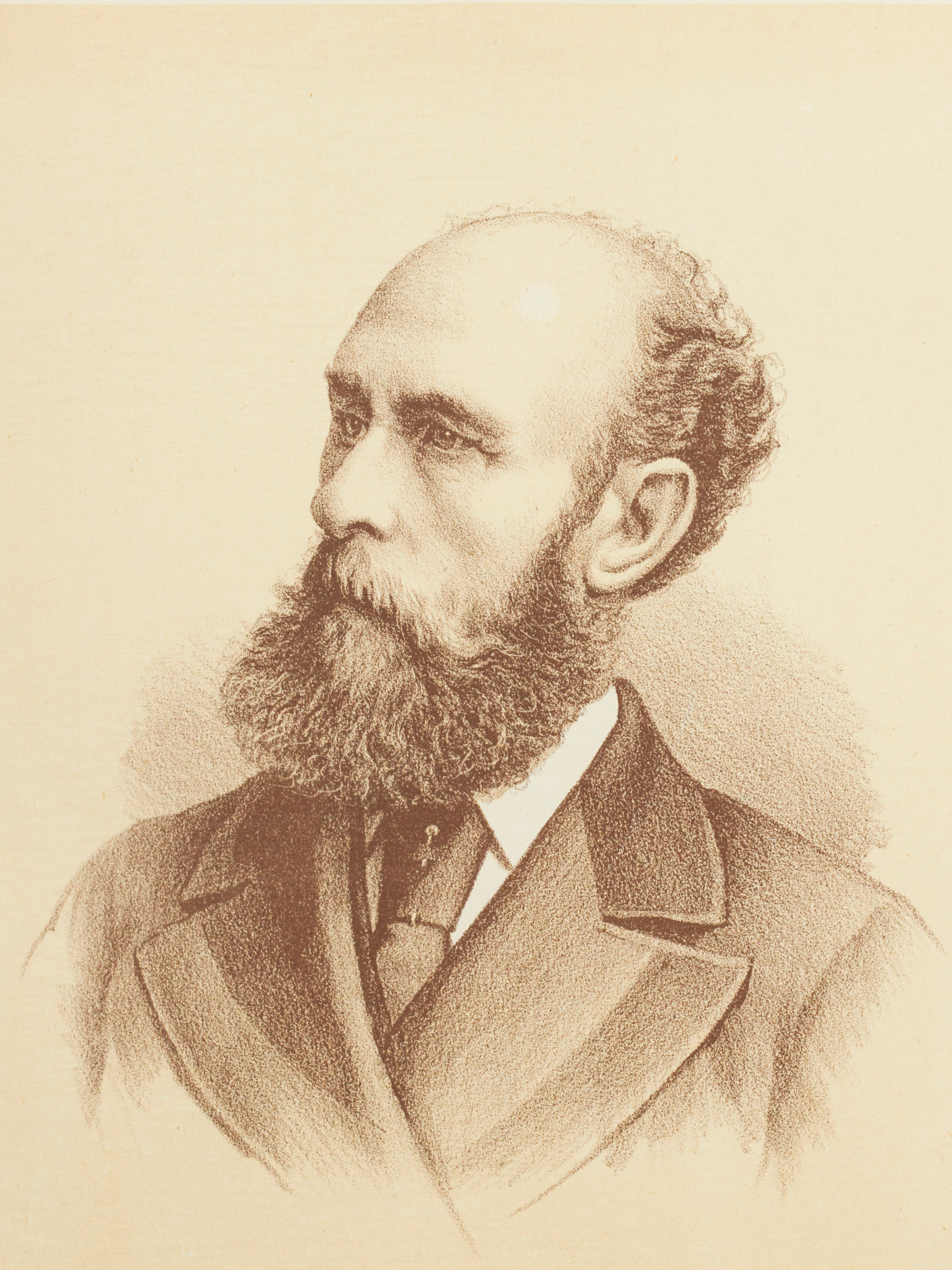

Member of the New South Wales Legislative Council
- In office 3 November 1874 – 25 October 1884
- Appointed by: Sir Hercules Robinson

Personal details
- Born: 1 January 1827 Dromore, County Down, Ireland
- Died: 25 October 1884 (aged 57) Edgecliff, Colony of New South Wales
- Resting place: Rookwood Cemetery
- Spouse: Elizabeth Ewan
- Occupation: Politician / Businessman

John Frazer (1827 – 25 October 1884) was an Irish-born Australian politician and businessman.

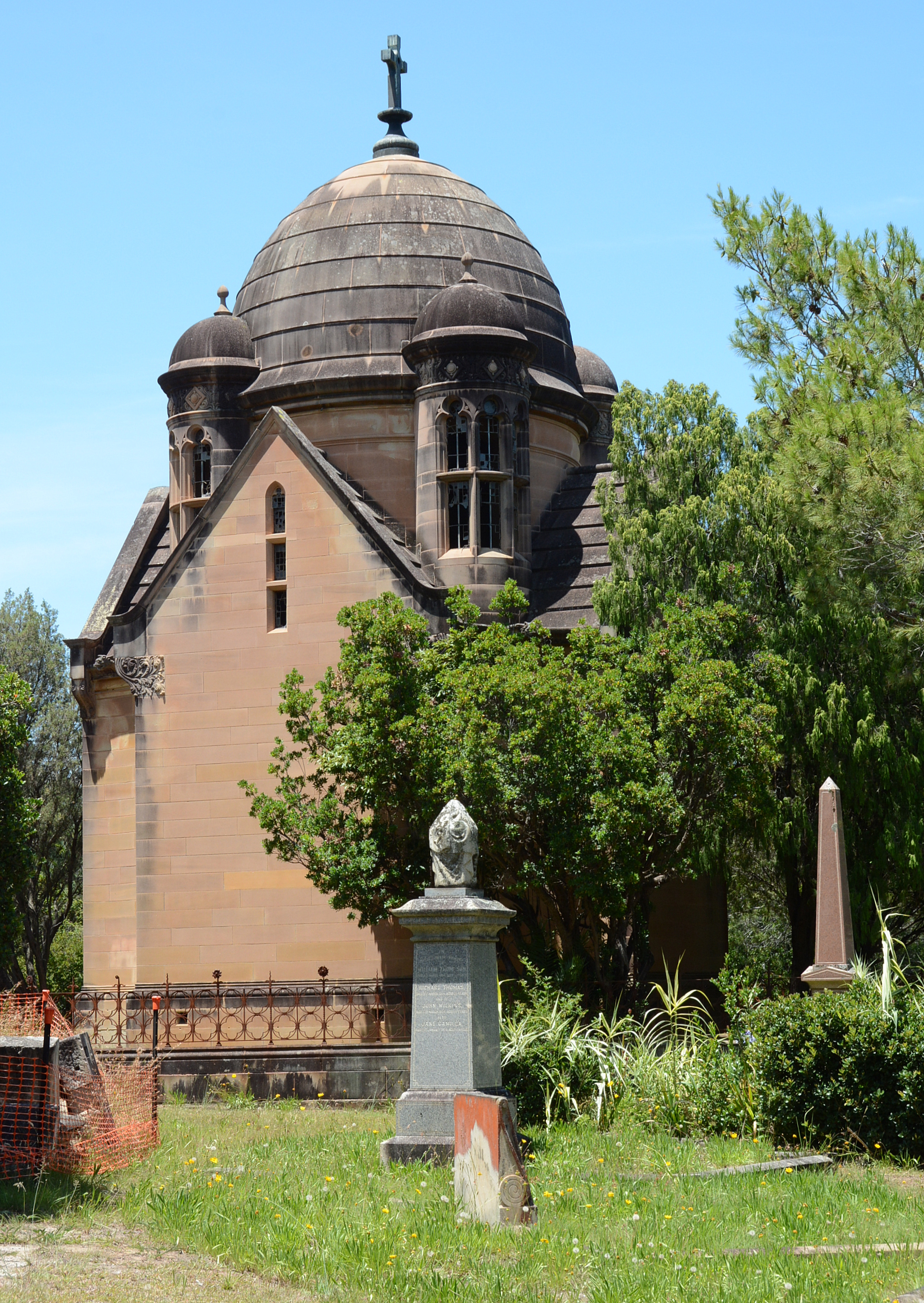
The Frazer family vault in Rookwood Cemetery, Sydney.

== Biography ==
Frazer was born at Dromore in County Down to John Frazer and Sarah Waddell. He migrated to New South Wales in 1842, becoming first a squatter and then a clerk. In 1847 he opened a wholesale grocery business in Sydney. He married Elizabeth Ewan, with whom he had four children, in 1853.

Frazer took his brother-in-law, James Ewan, into partnership in 1859. In the 1860s he was involved in land speculation and acquired several properties. In 1869 he retired from the business of John Frazer & Co, with his former client, and Ewan's future brother-in-law, James Watson, joining the partnership.

After his retirement, he devoted his attention to the erection of woolstores, warehouses, and other buildings in Sydney; one of his warehouses survives, in modified form, at 63 York Street, Sydney.

In 1862–1863, he was one of four prominent new shareholders that reformed the company operating the Fitzroy Iron Works at Mittagong. After this venture failed, he was instrumental in interesting English capitalists in investing in the Mittagong works. Frazer paid £10,000 to the bank in 1872, clearing the debts of the works. The new company issued its prospectus in April 1873. It was controlled by English interests, with Frazer being a shareholder.

During his business career, he was a director of Sydney Fire Insurance Company, Australian Joint Stock Bank, Mutual Life Assurance Company, Australasian Steam Navigation Company, the Australian Gaslight Company, Commercial Union Insurance Company, and other public companies, and, up to the time of his death, was a director of the Commercial Bank.

He was appointed to the New South Wales Legislative Council in 1874 and served there until his death on 25 October 1884.

He was a member of the Royal Society of New South Wales, and was a supporter of the University of Sydney, giving it debentures worth £2,000, to fund two bursaries, in 1870.

The last twenty years of Frazer's life were spent at Ranelagh, a three-storey, Italianate mansion in Darling Point Road, Darling Point. Ranelagh was demolished in 1967 and replaced with a high-rise apartment block also called Ranelagh. In 1881, he built a country retreat, at Springwood, Silva Plana, designed by Varney Parkes, on a landscaped site of 14 hectares (35 acres) that is now partly occupied by a retirement village.

Frazer and the members of his family were interred in a sandstone mausoleum in Rookwood Cemetery. It was built in 1894 along the lines specified by Frazer before his death. The doors bear his initials and those of his wife: JF and EF.

Funds donated by his family to the University of Sydney, in 1890, funded what is now known as the John Frazer Scholarship in history.

In accordance with an offer that he made before his death, two elaborate sandstone drinking fountains were presented to the City of Sydney in his name. One, erected in 1881, is now in Hyde Park South, near College Street, and the other, erected in 1884, is at the intersection of St Mary's Road and Art Gallery Road.

Frazer bequeathed three and a half acres of land and £500, for the construction of the Presbyterian Church at Springwood. It was opened in December 1895, although building work for the spire, chancel and vestry only commenced in 1896. For many years, it was known as the Frazer Memorial Presbyterian Church. The cedar of Lebanon in the churchyard was grown from a seed brought from the Middle East, by Frazer's widow, Elizabeth, in 1896.
