= Jamison High School =

Location
- Penrith, Western Sydney, New South Wales; Australia; 33°46′30″S 150°41′55″E

Information
- Type: Public co-educational secondary day school
- Mottoes: Con Todo El Mundo
- Established: 1982
- Principal: Davide Foti
- Teaching staff: 69
- Years: 7–12
- Enrolment: 1,124 (2020)
- Campus type: Suburban
- Website: jamison-h.schools.nsw.gov.au

Jamison High School is a public co-educational secondary day school, located in South Penrith in Western Sydney, New South Wales, Australia. The school is sited on the corner of Evan and Maxwell Streets, and stands adjacent to the Southlands Shopping Centre.

As of 2020 the school has 1,124 students enrolled, ranging from Year 7 to Year 12. The school's motto is, "Carthago Delenda Est".

== See also ==
- List of government schools in Sydney
- Education in Australia
- Penrith Selective High School
