= John Jamison =

Australian physician, pastoralist, politician (1776–1844)

Sir John Jamison
- Born: 1776; Carrickfergus, County Antrim, Kingdom of Ireland
- Died: 29 June 1844 (aged 67–68); Regentville, New South Wales
- Burial place: St Stephen's, Penrith, New South Wales
- Military career
- Allegiance: Great Britain; United Kingdom
- Branch: Royal Navy
- Service years: 1799–1813
- Rank: Ship's surgeon
- Conflicts: Napoleonic Wars; Battle of Trafalgar; Battle of San Domingo; Gunboat War

Sir John Jamison (1776 – 29 June 1844) was an Australian medical doctor, pastoralist, banker, politician, constitutional reformer and public figure.

== Family background ==
John Jamison was born in Carrickfergus, County Antrim, Ireland in 1776. Throughout his life he would pronounce his surname "Jemison", in the Irish manner.

He was the son of Thomas Jamison (1752/53-1811) and Rebecca (1746-1838). Thomas Jamison was a Northern Irishman, who arrived in New South Wales, Australia, with the First Fleet in 1788, aboard HMS Sirius, as a surgeon's mate. Soon afterwards, Thomas was sent to the auxiliary British colony of Norfolk Island, where he served as principal medical officer during the 1790s - while accumulating wealth on the side as a maritime trader. Then, in 1801, after taking leave in England, Thomas was promoted to the position of Surgeon-General of New South Wales due to his intelligence, administrative competence, driving ambition and gift for cultivating useful patrons in London.

== Naval career ==
Like his father, he trained as a surgeon, joining the Royal Navy in 1799. He served under Admiral Lord Horatio Nelson at the Battle of Trafalgar in 1805 aboard the Agamemnon. In 1806, he saw further action at the Battle of San Domingo on the same vessel which, incidentally, was Nelson's favourite warship. One year later, Jamison graduated as a physician from Edinburgh University, earning a Doctorate of Medicine.

While serving with the Royal Navy's Baltic Fleet in 1807 - aboard the hospital ship Gorgon - he treated a scurvy outbreak in the allied Swedish Navy, and was made a Knight of the Order of Gustavus Vasa (KGV) by a grateful Swedish king. He was also knighted by Britain's prince regent (afterwards George IV) in May 1813, and subsequently appointed Inspector of Naval Hospitals and Fleets.

== Career in Australia ==
Meanwhile, Thomas Jamison had died in London in 1811. Jamison succeeded to his father's property, which included land at Jamisontown on the Nepean River, west of Sydney. He arrived in Sydney on 28 July 1814, aboard the Broxbornebury, to take up his patrimony. The following year, he accompanied Governor Lachlan Macquarie on his official visitation to the Bathurst Plains, and had the Jamison Valley in the Blue Mountains named in his honour by Macquarie.

Jamison was Australia's first titled free settler and thus head of the fledgling country's social pecking order. He acquired allotments in the heart of Sydney, and accumulated vast tracts of land in the central-western and northern parts of New South Wales between 1814 and 1840. He was a founder of the Bank of New South Wales in 1817, and established himself as one of the most prominent (and wealthiest) men in Australia, enjoying a reputation for lavish entertaining and hospitality at Regentville, his magnificent rural estate near the town of Penrith.

Governor Darling in 1829 mentioned that Jamison was then President of the New South Wales Agricultural Society, "holding perhaps the largest stake in the country". In 1830, London's Society for the Encouragement of Arts, Manufactures and Commerce awarded him the large gold medal "for his successful method of extirpating the stumps of trees". He also won various awards for his wine and other agricultural produce, and took a keen scientific interest in the natural history of the Sydney region. He was a committed Freemason and a founding father of the New South Wales thoroughbred racing industry. Benevolent organisations benefited from his generosity, and in 1830 he helped establish Sydney College - an important educational facility which gave rise to both Sydney Grammar School and the University of Sydney. In 1831, Jamison was restored to the magistracy, and, in 1837, he was belatedly appointed a member of the Legislative Council of New South Wales. During the mid-1830s, he held office as founder-president of the Australian Patriotic Association, which strove to liberalise the colony's political and legal institutions as Sydney evolved from a penal settlement into a thriving, mercantile port.

Jamison established a cloth mill at Regentville in 1842 to supplement the estate's earnings from its vineyard, horse stud, dairy, orchard and collection of grazing paddocks for sheep and cattle. But he suffered the loss of a large proportion of his fortune around this time due to the effects of a protracted drought and an economic depression, which had sent many of the colony's farmers and businessmen broke. He was omitted from the Legislative Council nominations in 1843 on account of his infirmities and comparatively advanced years. (Without doubt, his poor state of health had been accentuated by the hedonistic lifestyle that he had led since his arrival in New South Wales.) Jamison died at Regentville House on 29 June 1844 and was buried in St Stephen's churchyard, Penrith. His grave survives but Regentville House does not: the two-storey Georgian mansion, erected during 1823–1824, burned down in 1869.

Jamison Street in Sydney's CBD, which was once the site of Jamison's town house, commemorates him - as does the Jamison Valley, Jamison County, Jamison Creek, Jamison High School, Jamison Park and a number of other localities in New South Wales.

== Children ==
Jamison fathered a number of illegitimate children by several mistresses. These mistresses included Mary Griffiths - the daughter of Regentville's dairyman, with whom he had two sons and five daughters. Jamison married Mary a few months before his death, thus enabling her to be styled Lady Jamison. One of their sons, Robert Jamison (1829-1878), was a Member of the Legislative Assembly of New South Wales from 1856 to 1860. Lady Jamison died at Hunters Hill, Sydney in 1874, aged 74. She was interred in Camperdown Cemetery in the inner-Sydney suburb of Newtown. Her grave, like Sir John's, is extant. Another of Jamison's mistresses was Catherine Cain(e), the convict 'housekeeper' assigned to him at his Sydney residence. Catherine gave birth to a daughter by him, Harriet Eliza Jamison, in 1819. Harriet grew up to be a cultivated and pious young woman. In 1837, she married into the colonial establishment. Her husband was William John Gibbes (1815-1868) - a son of the Collector of Customs for New South Wales, Colonel John George Nathaniel Gibbes (1787-1873). The wedding took place at St James' Anglican Church, Sydney, in the presence of the governor. Harriet died in Sydney in 1896.
