= Dunheved =

Dunheved may refer to:

- Dunheved, a Sydney locality in the suburb of St Marys, New South Wales
- Launceston, Cornwall, formerly Dunheved
  - Dunheved (UK Parliament constituency), previous name for the Launceston parliamentary constituency
