= Erskine Park =

- Suburb
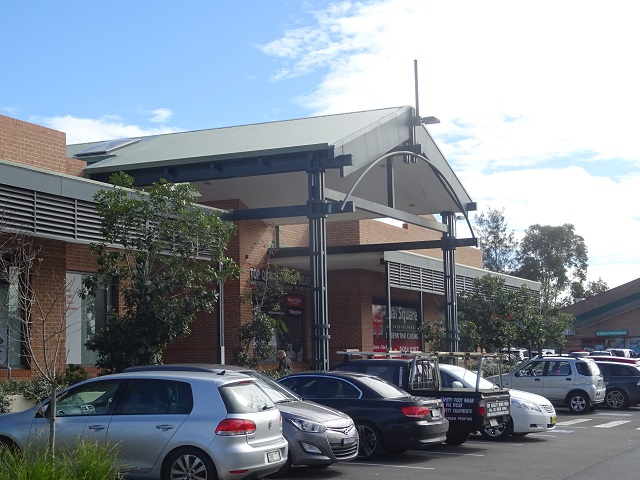
- Erskine Park Shopping Centre

- Interactive map of Erskine Park
- Country: Australia
- State: New South Wales
- City: Sydney
- LGA: City of Penrith
- Location: 42 km (26 mi) west of Sydney CBD
- Established: 1981

Government
  - State electorate: Badgerys Creek
  - Federal division: McMahon
- Elevation: 56 m (184 ft)

Population
  - Total: 6,486 (2021 census)
- Postcode: 2759
Suburbs around Erskine Park
St Marys	Colyton	Minchinbury
St Clair	Erskine Park	Eastern Creek
Orchard Hills	Kemps Creek	Horsley Park

Erskine Park is a suburb of Sydney in the state of New South Wales, Australia. Erskine Park is located 42 kilometres west of the Sydney central business district, in the local government area of the City of Penrith and is part of the Greater Western Sydney region.

Erskine Park, along with Colyton, are the easternmost suburbs in the City of Penrith. Erskine Park is a growing, predominantly residential suburb with some industrial developments. The suburb has a high school, primary school and some local shops. It has two schools, Erskine Park High School and James Erskine Public School.

== History ==
Erskine Park is named after James Erskine, Lieutenant Governor to Lachlan Macquarie, who was granted land in this area in the early days of the colony. The local school, James Erskine Public School, is named in his honor.

== Population ==
At the 2021 census, there were 6,486 residents in Erskine Park.

- Aboriginal and Torres Strait Islander people made up 3.0% of the population.
- This suburb has a slightly younger population than average, with a median age of 37 and 18.8% of people aged 14 years or under.
- The most common ancestries in Erskine Park were Australian 31.5%, English 26.9%, Irish 6.6%, Filipino 6.2% and Scottish 5.4%.
- 70.7% of people were born in Australia. The next most common countries of birth were Philippines 3.8%, New Zealand 2.3% and England 1.9%.
- 73.4% of people only spoke English at home. Other languages spoken at home included Arabic 3.9% and Tagalog 2.3%.
- The top responses for religious affiliation were Catholic 36.2%, No Religion 23.4% and Anglican 12.1%.
- Top industries of employment included Hospitals (except Psychiatric Hospitals) 4.1%, Supermarket and Grocery Stores 3.6% and Road Freight Transport 3.5%.
- The median weekly household income was $2,349 and this was higher than the national median of $1,746.

== Commercial area ==
The local shopping centre features a supermarket, hairdressers, butcher, bakery, pharmacy and an Aldi. There was a newsagent in the main shopping centre until late 2017

An industrial area on the southern outskirts is known as the Erskine Business Park. It contains warehouses for DHL Supply Chain, Sony DADC, BlueScope Steel, Koorong Bookstore, Hasbro, Ceva and a Woolworths Liquor distribution centre. There is a large park located near the industrial area along the main road. There is a footpath that accommodates pedestrians and bike riders and there is a basketball/netball court.

== Transport ==
Erskine Park is located near the junction of the M4 Western Motorway and Westlink M7 Motorway. There is a link road proposed from the Business Park to the Westlink M7.

== Schools and churches ==
- James Erskine Public School has over 500 students.
- Erskine Park High School has over 800 students.
- Cornerstone Baptist Church is a small church affiliated with the Australian Fellowship of Bible-Believing Churches.

== Recreation ==
A bike track runs from Erskine Park Road to Bennett Road in St Clair. A natural bush area in Erskine Park is used for both biking and camping.

== Notable residents ==
- Usman Khawaja, Australian cricketer
- Steve Turner, Former NRL player
- Paige Hadley, Australian netballer
- Hannah Darlington, Australian cricketer
