= St Clair, New South Wales =

St Clair
- Suburb
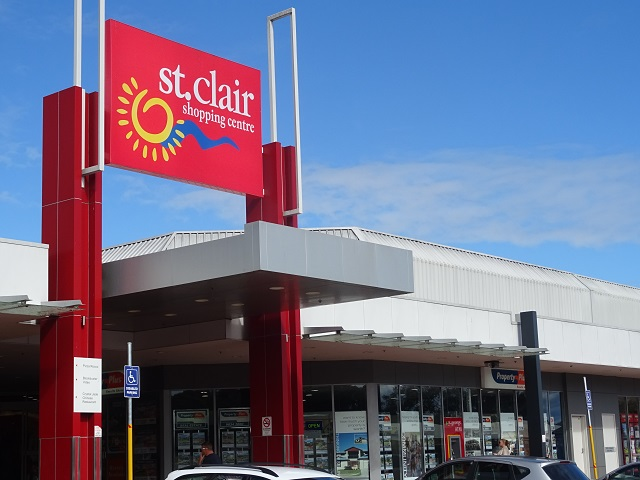
- St Clair Shopping Centre c. 2015

- Interactive map of St Clair
- Country: Australia
- State: New South Wales
- City: Sydney
- LGA: Penrith City Council
- Location: 44 km (27 mi) west of Sydney CBD
- Established: 1981

Government
  - State electorate: Badgerys Creek
  - Federal division: McMahon
- Elevation: 50 m (160 ft)

Population
  - Total: 19,942 (2021 census)
- Postcode: 2759
Suburbs around St Clair
| St Marys | Colyton | Minchinbury |
| Orchard Hills | St Clair | Erskine Park |
| Orchard Hills | Erskine Park | Erskine Park |

St Clair is a suburb of Sydney, in the state of New South Wales, Australia. It is 44 kilometres west of the Sydney central business district, in the local government area of the City of Penrith and is part of the Greater Western Sydney region. St Clair is within view of the Blue Mountains.

== History ==
St Clair takes its name from a residential housing development established in 1970. The current St Clair Post Office opened on 17 March 1981.

=== Aboriginal culture ===
Traditionally, the area was inhabited by the indigenous Dharug people. However, by the year 1816, the Dharug people had been decimated by clashes with settlers and contracting diseases brought to the area by Europeans. As time passed, the traditional culture declined, as it did across the entire continent and they became increasingly dependent on the settlers for their survival. Although they had always maintained a camp on or around the Mamre estate (which is found adjacent to St Clair, in the suburb of St Marys, the Rev. Samuel Marsden now sought to encourage them to work in exchange for food and clothing.

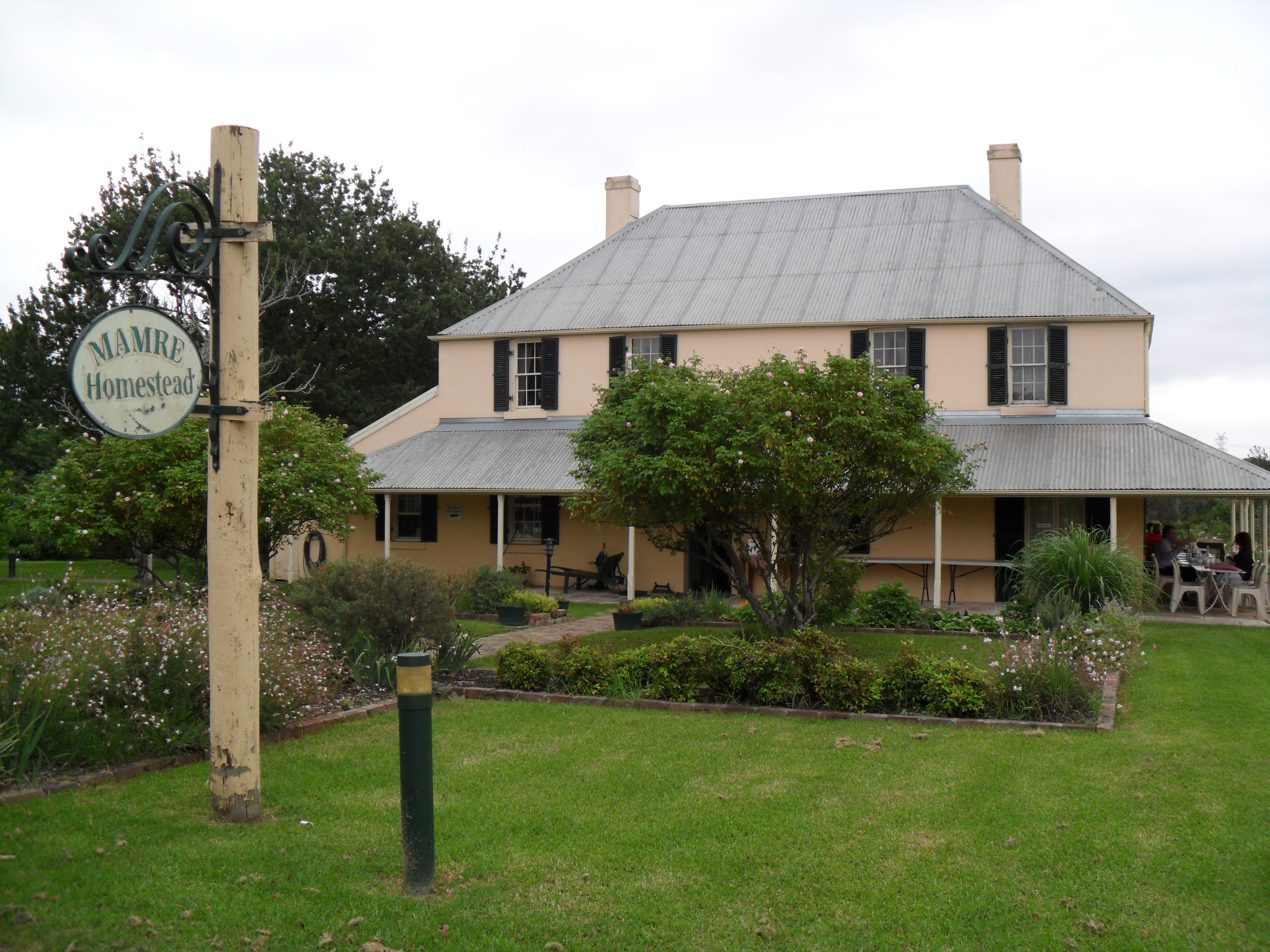

=== European settlement ===
The area was part of an area named South Creek. It was later, unofficially, known as South St Marys, with the southern section being named Erskine Park. The original site of St Clair was once part of Chatsworth Nursery, a branch of Darling Nursery, which had been established in 1827 during the reign of King George IV. The owner Thomas Shepherd developed an irrigation system utilizing water from Eastern Creek and a large portion of the area was covered with Camelia orchards. The nursery, known for its camellias, was moved to Colyton and existed until the end of the 19th century. The area remained largely rural until a new housing development in the 1970s.

The name "St Clair" has no historical links with the area. It was the name given to a residential housing development established in 1970 by the Latex Finance Company, a subsidiary of the Cambridge Finance Company which went bankrupt in the year 1976. The Land Commission of New South Wales acquired the land after a bankruptcy declaration and extended the area to create a large suburb. The Geographical Names Board of New South Wales eventually made the decision in late 1981 to divide the area into two separate suburbs named St Clair and Erskine Park, rather than call the whole area Erskine Park as many people had desired. Its population has soared since 1981 and is now a well established suburb with modern facilities with close access to the M4 Motorway and shopping centre.

== Location ==
The suburb is bordered by Erskine Park Road to the east, the M4 Motorway on the north and Mamre Road along its western boundary. The suburb to the south and east of St Clair is Erskine Park. Considerable parklands provide open space for recreational activities and St Clair is renowned for having a family oriented atmosphere.

Next to St Clair is Erskine Park but once called "Fox Dale", which is located on the eastern and southern sides of Erskine Park Road. Erskine Park is not as big as St Clair in housing and population, but a massive new industrial area to the south encompassing developments on Lenore Lane and James Erskine Drive is partially developed and bringing new opportunities to the area.

The new development is expected to bridge Old Wallgrove Rd with Lenore Lane and Archibold Road in the future. This will create a freight corridor connecting the area's three main industrial areas at Minchinbury, Erskine Park and Wonderland, along with the two mines in the area, encouraging heavy vehicles down non-suburban back roads, freeing up the existing roads for car traffic, and substantially reducing travel time from the current 45 minutes in heavy traffic to 10 minutes.

== Schools ==
The suburb has one public high school which is located on Endeavour Avenue, named St Clair High School. Some St Clair residents are zoned to go to the nearby Erskine Park High School. Private high schools near St Clair include Emmaus Catholic College and Mamre Anglican School. Primary schools in St Clair include St Clair Public School, Banks Public School, Blackwell Public School, Clairgate Public School and Holy Spirit Catholic School.

A fire occurred at St Clair High School in the early morning hours of 29 June 2014. Fire and Rescue NSW reported later that morning that the fire was extinguished by 0545, but that 80% of a two-storey building was destroyed. There were no victims. Following the fire, the Department of Education funded a AU$20,000,000 redevelopment of the school, which opened in October 2018, providing the school with 16 new classrooms, a research area, lecture hall, 3 new kitchens & a cafe, multiple outdoor learning areas, and a large opened terraced area, providing many new facilities for students to use throughout their schooling

== Commercial area ==
In 2008, St Clair shopping centre underwent a major refurbishment with new specialty stores, a food court area, and outdoor seating. It contains medical facilities including X-ray, pathology and optometrist, food outlets, news, fashion and jewelry, electronics, the local library, and a petrol station. Two local schools border the shopping centre to the west and south, as do soccer fields to the north containing a recently constructed skate bowl. There are also 3 BWS bottle shops located within the suburb, within a relatively close proximity. The Blue Cattle Dog Hotel is the only pub located in St Clair or Erskine Park. It is on the corner of Mamre Road and Banks Drive.

== Politics ==
St Clair is in the federal Division of McMahon, held by Australian Labor Party's Chris Bowen and the state district of Badgerys Creek, held by Liberal Tanya Davies.

It was previously in the federal Division of Prospect.

== Leisure Centre ==
St Clair has an indoor leisure centre, located behind St Clair Shopping Centre. The centre is managed by the local government authority Penrith City Council.

== Neighborhood Centre ==
Community Junction Inc. now covers St Clair, Erskine Park, Colyton, St Marys and Werrington. CJI manages several community halls on behalf of Penrith Council, as well as a number of programs for residents.

== Churches ==
Holy Spirit Parish, St Clair.

== See also ==
- St Clair Comets - rugby league club
