= Colyton, New South Wales =

Colyton
- Suburb
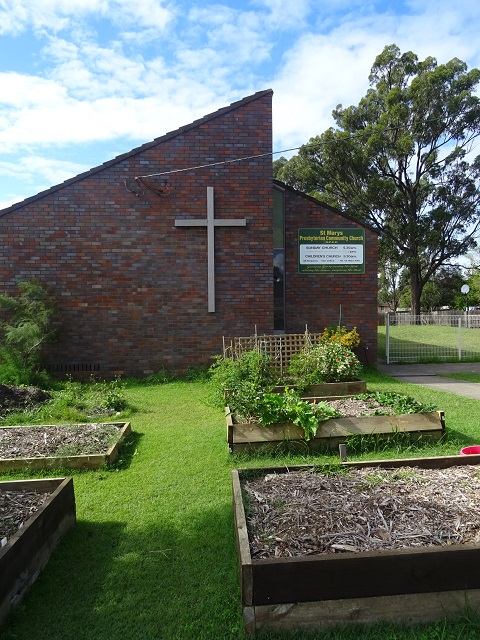
- Presbyterian Community Church, Marsden Road, Colyton

- Interactive map of Colyton
- Country: Australia
- State: New South Wales
- City: Sydney
- LGA: Penrith City Council
- Location: 43 km (27 mi) W of Sydney
- Established: 1846

Government
  - State electorate: Londonderry
  - Federal division: Lindsay
- Elevation: 57 m (187 ft)

Population
  - Total: 8,770 (2021 census)
- Postcode: 2760
Suburbs around Colyton
| St Marys | Oxley Park | Mount Druitt |
| St Marys | Colyton | Minchinbury |
| St Clair | St Clair | Erskine Park |

Colyton is a suburb of Sydney, in the state of New South Wales, Australia 43 kilometres west of the Sydney central business district, in the local government area of the City of Penrith. It is part of the Greater Western Sydney region.

Colyton, along with Erskine Park, are the easternmost suburbs of the City of Penrith. Its boundaries are Ropes Creek, the Great Western Highway, Marsden Road and the M4 Western Motorway. Colyton is one of the older suburbs in the St Marys area with homes on large blocks of land – primarily 1/4 acre and 1/3 acre blocks. Colyton is primarily a residential area with large sporting fields, Bennett Road Primary School, Colyton High School, Colyton Shopping Centre and the Life Education Centre. There is some industrial activity along Roper Road. Note that Colyton Primary School is not located in Colyton, but across the Great Western Highway in Old Mt Druitt.

== History ==
Colyton is named after Colyton in Devon, England, which had been the home town of the wife of William Cox Junior, son of the famous builder of the road across the Blue Mountains, also named William. The property of 800 acres (3.2 km^{2}) had been granted to Cox on 17 August 1819 by Governor Macquarie. It was located on the southern side of the Western Highway opposite the present Colyton Primary School. The land was only used for grazing and wheat growing. On 9 April 1842, a notice appeared in the Sydney Herald advertising the auction sale of William Cox's estate to form the 'Village of Colyton' with surrounding farmlets. The land was described as partly forest and partly alluvial with grass on it being 'abundant and nutritious'. The timber on the land was described as being fit for 'building and farming purposes' and the water 'abundant and never failing' from nearby Ropes Creek.

Historically, the name Colyton generally referred to the area east of Ropes Creek. The present site of Colyton was originally part of St Marys.

Colyton Post Office opened on 15 October 1892 and closed in 1962.

== Demographics ==
According to the 2021 census of Population, there were 8,770 people in Colyton.

- Aboriginal and Torres Strait Islander people made up 6.1% of the population.
- 65.2% of people were born in Australia. The next most common countries of birth were Philippines 3.0%, New Zealand 2.7%, Fiji 2.2%, India 1.9% and England 1.7%.
- 64.9% of people spoke only English at home. Other languages spoken at home included Arabic 4.8%, Hindi 2.2%, Samoan 1.6%, Tagalog 1.6% and Turkish 1.3%.
- The most common responses for religion were Catholic 28.1%, No Religion 24.9% and Anglican 11.6%.
- The most common occupations included Machinery Operators and Drivers 17.3%, Clerical and Administrative Workers 15.4%, Technicians and Trades Workers 12.8%, Labourers 12.0%, and Community and Personal Service Workers 11.6%.
- Of occupied private dwellings in Colyton, 95.1% were separate houses and 4.0% were semi-detached.

== Transport ==
Colyton has convenient access to both the Great Western Highway and the M4 Motorway. Bus services are provided by Busways to St Marys railway station, Westfield Mount Druitt and Mount Druitt railway station.

== Schools ==
Bennett Road Public School and Colyton High School are the two schools in the suburb.

Bennett Road Public School was first established on 14 October 1961, serving the growing suburb of St Marys, with 230 pupils. Warren Kennedy was the first school principal. The library was opened in 1984 and the hall and a new canteen were opened in 1986.

Colyton Public School (located in Old Mt Druitt) was established during the late 1800s. Its new school hall opened in November 2009 and the canteen has been connected to the hall.

== Churches ==
- Colyton Baptist Church has been ministering to the people of Colyton and the surrounding suburbs since 2014. Services are held in Bennett Road Public School which is 100-114 Bennett Rd, Colyton NSW at 4pm
- Christian Reformed Church is located on Marsden Road
- Presbyterian Community Church is located on Marsden Road

== Parks ==
- Kevin Maley Park
- Mick Martin Park
- Brooker & Day Street Reserve
- Gunning Park
- Potter Field
