= St Marys, New South Wales =

St Marys
- Suburb
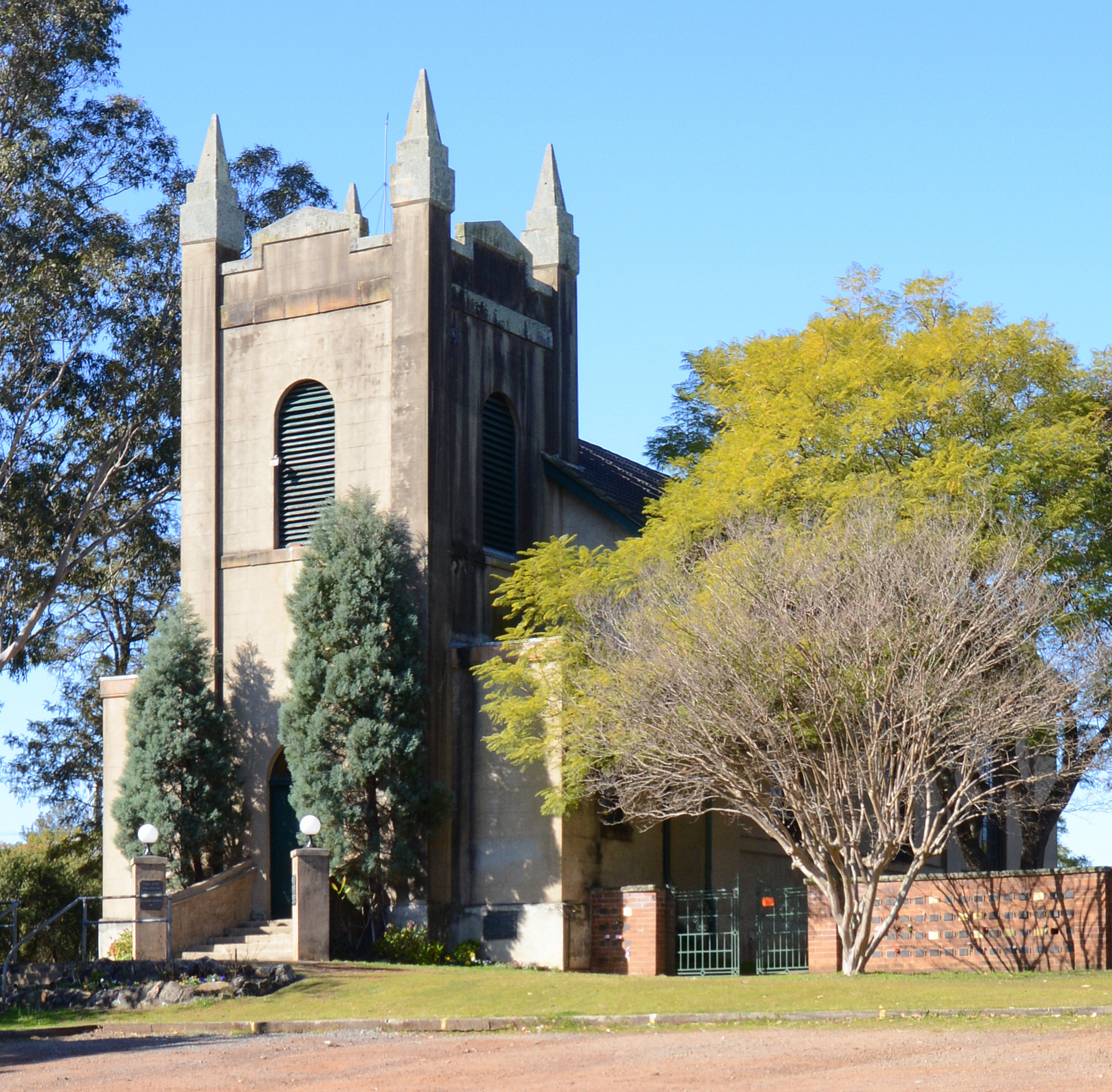
- St Mary Magdalene Anglican Church

- Interactive map of St Marys
- Country: Australia
- State: New South Wales
- City: Sydney
- LGAs: City of Penrith; Blacktown City Council
- Location: 46 km (29 mi) west of Sydney CBD
- Established: 1840

Government
  - State electorate: Londonderry
  - Federal division: Lindsay

Area
  - Total: 10.6 km^{2} (4.1 sq mi)
- Elevation: 37 m (121 ft)

Population
  - Total: 13,256 (SAL 2021)
- Postcode: 2760
Suburbs around St Marys
Jordan Springs; Werrington County	Shanes Park; Llandilo	Willmot; Lethbridge Park; Ropes Crossing
Werrington; Claremont Meadows	St Marys	North St Marys; Oxley Park
Orchard Hills; Claremont Meadows	St Clair	Colyton; St Clair

St Marys is a suburb in western Sydney, in the state of New South Wales, Australia. It is 46 kilometres (29 mi) west of the Sydney central business district, within the local government areas of City of Penrith and a minor northern part in the Blacktown City Council.

St Marys is situated between South Creek, which forms its western boundary, and Ropes Creek which serves as its eastern boundary. The Western train line divides the suburb into northern and southern sections. The northern portion of St Marys/Dunheved is primarily focused on trade, particularly in the automotive sector, as well as manufacturing, waste processing, and storage housing, albeit the area inhibiting a leagues club. In contrast, the southern end of St Marys is a more commercial and residential hub, with Queen Street functioning as the 'main street' retail district, complemented with neighbouring shopping centres, a town square, a swimming pool, community centres, sports fields, and schools.

== History ==
The township of St Marys was first known as South Creek. The Bennett coach and wagon works manufactured horse-drawn wagons to meet the growing demand for transport in Sydney. There are currently three such wagons on display, each in its own enclosure, at South Creek Park (on the northern side of the Great Western Hwy, east of South Creek).

The suburb is named after the parish church of St Mary Magdalene, which was built between 1837 and 1840 and modeled after the church of the same name in Cornwall. The church is situated on Magdalene Street between the Great Western Highway and King Street. The church foundation stone was laid on 22 November 1837 by Bishop Broughton, and the cathedral, along with being heritage-listed, is one of the oldest churches in New South Wales that still has regular services. Internees in the church cemetery include the wife of Philip Gidley King, Governor of New South Wales, plus numerous members of the King family. The land was donated by King's son and the bricks were made on his estate. The nearby King, Gidley and Lethbridge streets were named after various members of the King family.

The site is believed to have been chosen by the mother of Phillip Parker King. The property had been acquired from John Oxley in 1828 by King, the original grant having been made in 1823. Other land grants in the area included those to Anna Josepha King in 1807 (Dunheved), Samuel Marsden (Mamre), and Mary Putland (Frogmore).

The area was first called South Creek because European settlement was originally centred along the banks of the creek. The land grants became working holdings because of the permanent water supply. The rich alluvial soil along the banks of the creek ensured an expanding agricultural community and its location on what was then called the Great Western Road, later renamed to the Great Western Highway, meant that it became a convenient staging post.

The name St Marys was first used when the St Mary's Post Office was opened on 1 October 1840. The township formed part of a grant to Mary Putland (later married Sir Maurice O'Connell), the daughter of Governor William Bligh (former master of HMS Bounty, during the famous mutiny in 1789). Closer settlement of the area was made possible when in 1842 part of the O’Connell Estate was subdivided.

St Marys has an extensive and rich industrial and agricultural history, including tanneries and munitions formerly operated by Australian Defence Industries.

Mamre, situated on Mamre Road, was built c.1830 for Samuel Marsden. It is a two-storey Georgian home that was heritage-listed in 1999.

Circa 1829–32, the Lethbridge family built the Werrington House just north of St Marys. It was derived from their family home in Cornwall. It is one of the most significant colonial homes in New South Wales and was heritage-listed in 1989.

St Marys is now the home of the South Creek/St Marys Outpost sub-branc of the Vietnam Veterans Association and the St Marys & District Historical Society Inc.

=== Municipality of St Marys ===
The Municipality of St Marys was first proclaimed on 3 March 1890, and the election of the first council was held in May 1890. The council was amalgamated with the Municipality of Penrith on 1 January 1949. The first Mayor was William Garner, and the last mayor was J J Blair (1948). There is a branch office of the Penrith City Council on Queen Street along with a library. The St Marys & District Historical Society is open to the public on Wednesdays and Saturdays from 10 am to 2 pm in the Community Centre complex located on Mamre Road on the southern side of the Great Western Highway.

== Heritage listings ==
St Marys has a number of heritage-listed sites, including:

- Great Western Railway: St Marys railway station
- St Marys Magdalene Church
- Bronte House
- Mimosa House

== Gallery ==
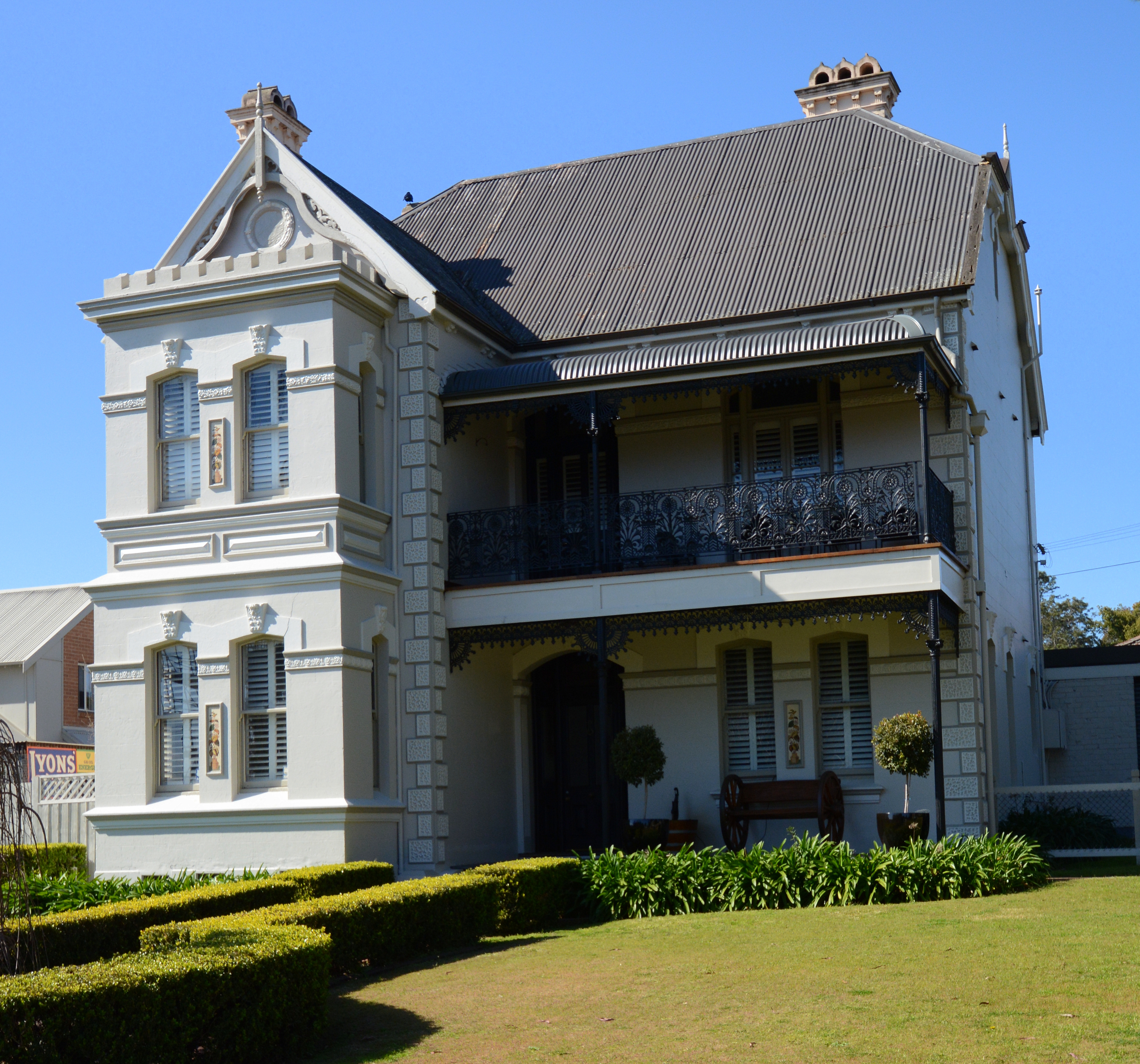
Italianate house, known as 'Bronte', located on the corner of Gidley Street and King Street. The house was built in 1889 for James Bennet Jr, local wagonwright.

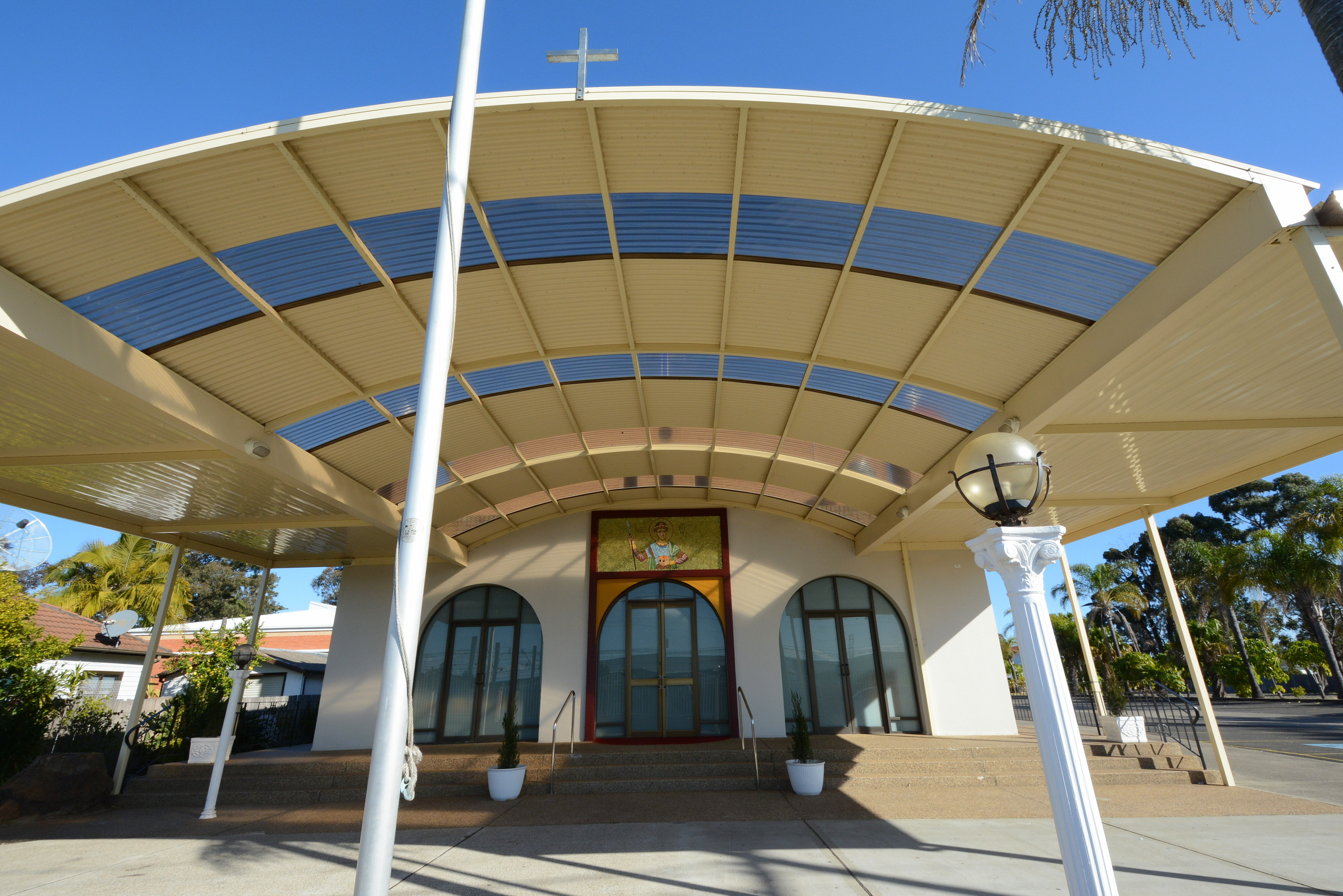
Greek Orthodox Church, Hobart Street The church also has facilities for a Greek-language school, which offers Greek-language and cultural lessons for school-aged attendees

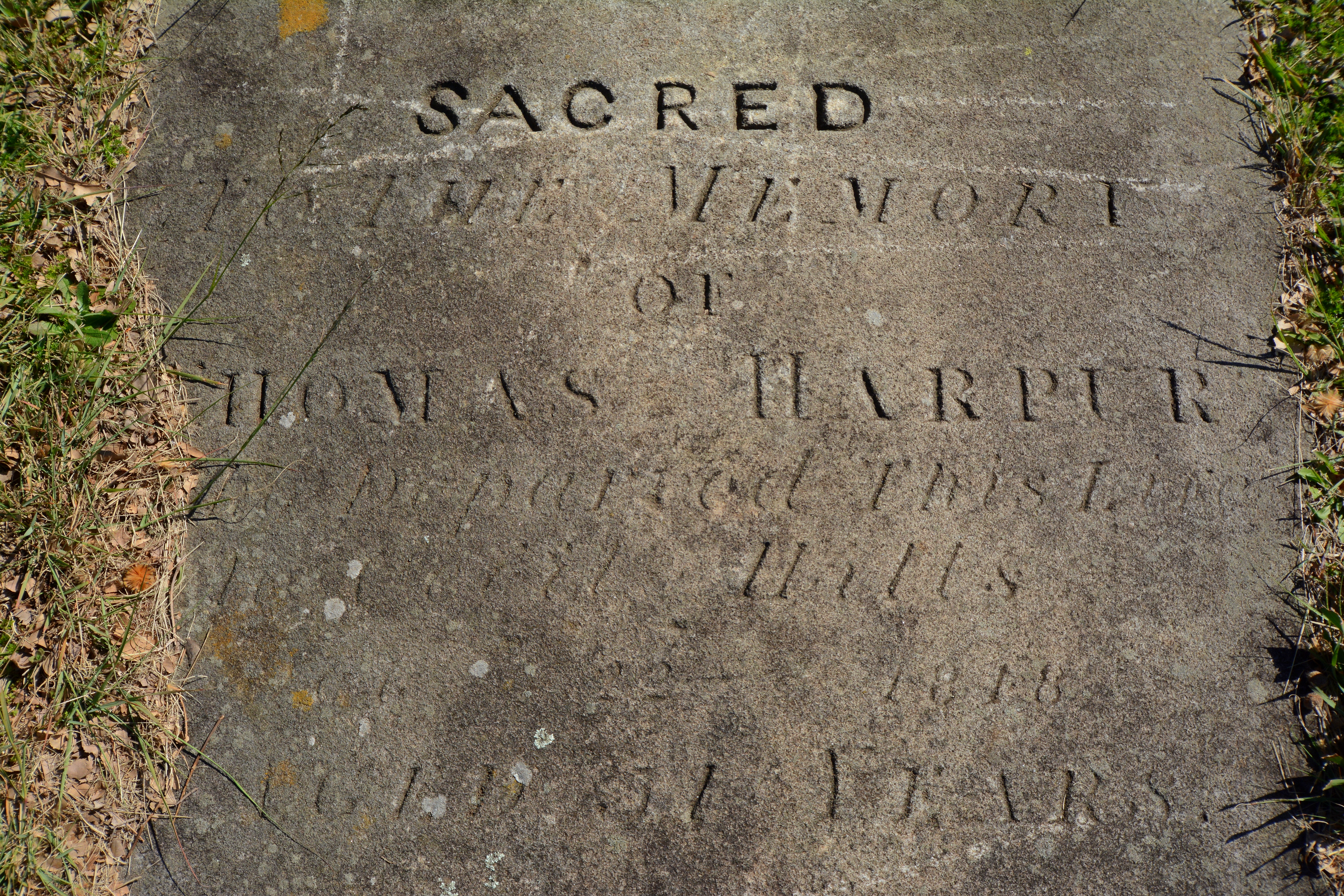
Grave dated 1818, cemetery of St Mary's Anglican Church

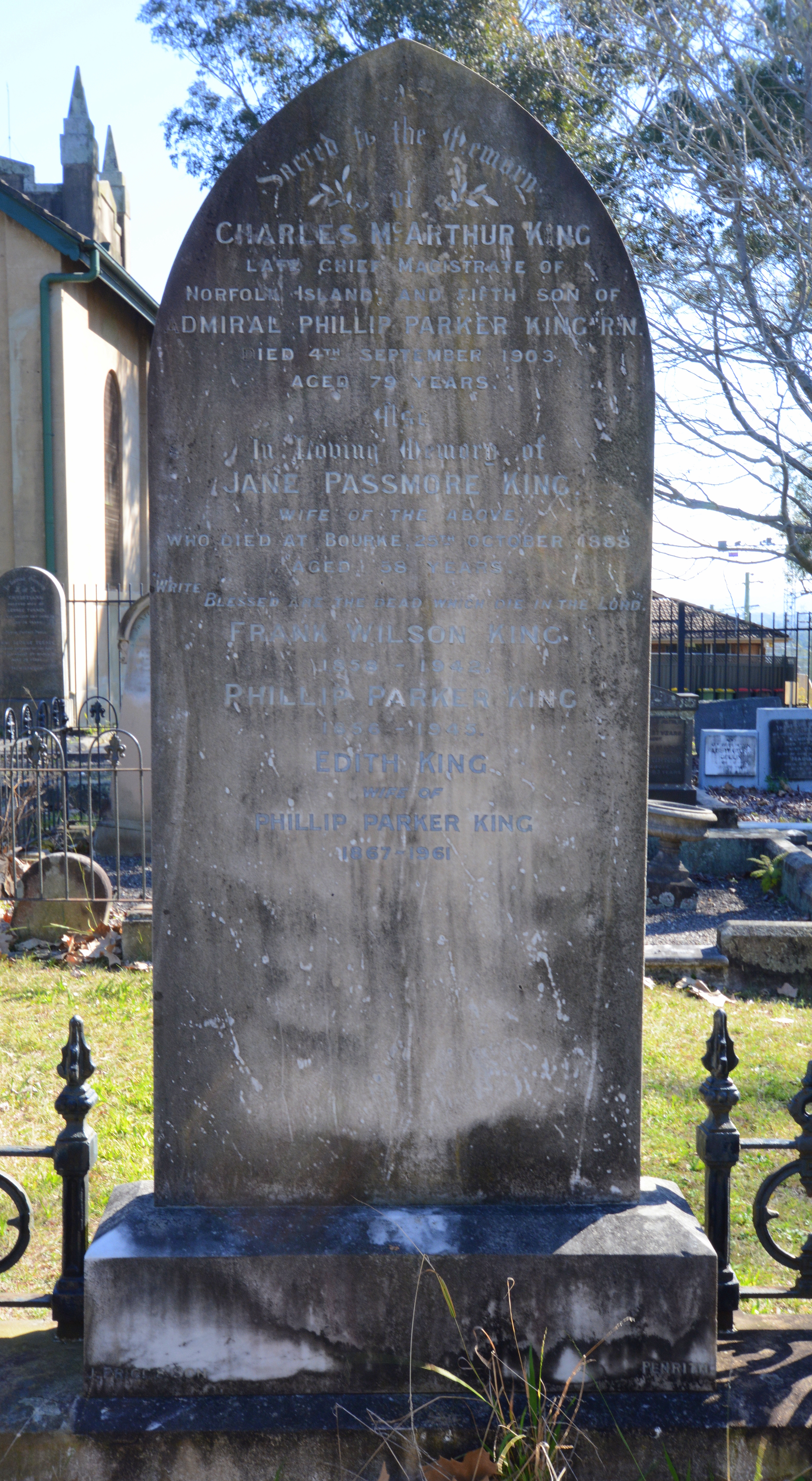
Grave of members of the King family, cemetery of St Mary's Church

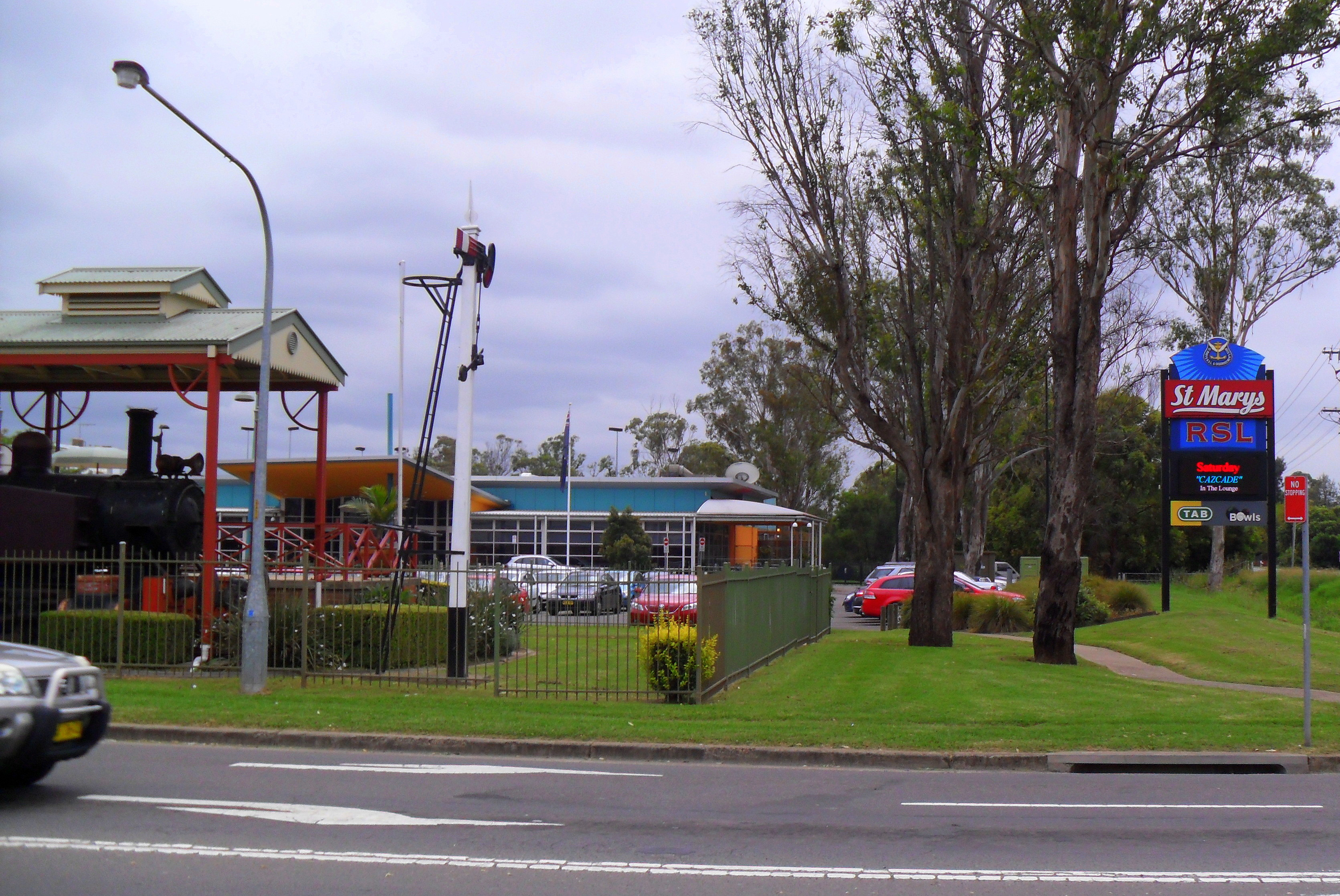
St Marys RSL, corner Hall Street and Mamre Road. The RSL also houses an office of the St Marys Vietnam Veterans' Outpost, which holds meetings in the train carrages in front of the RSL.

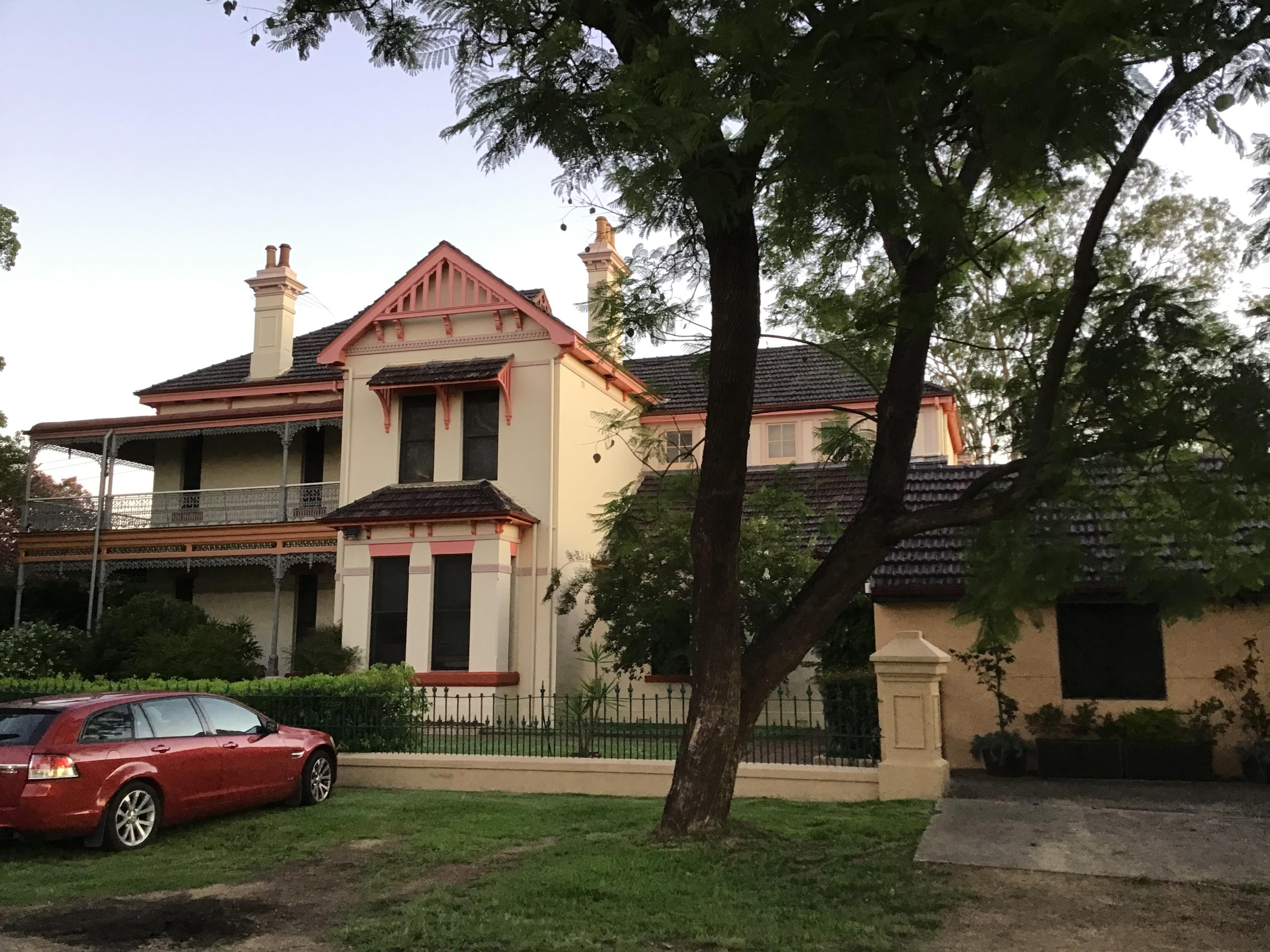
Mimosa, a Victorian-style house built for the family of Andrew Thompson, a local tanner and businessman. The house was reported by the 1984 September issue of the Nepean Times newspaper to be "the costliest building in the Nepean District" at the time of its completion.

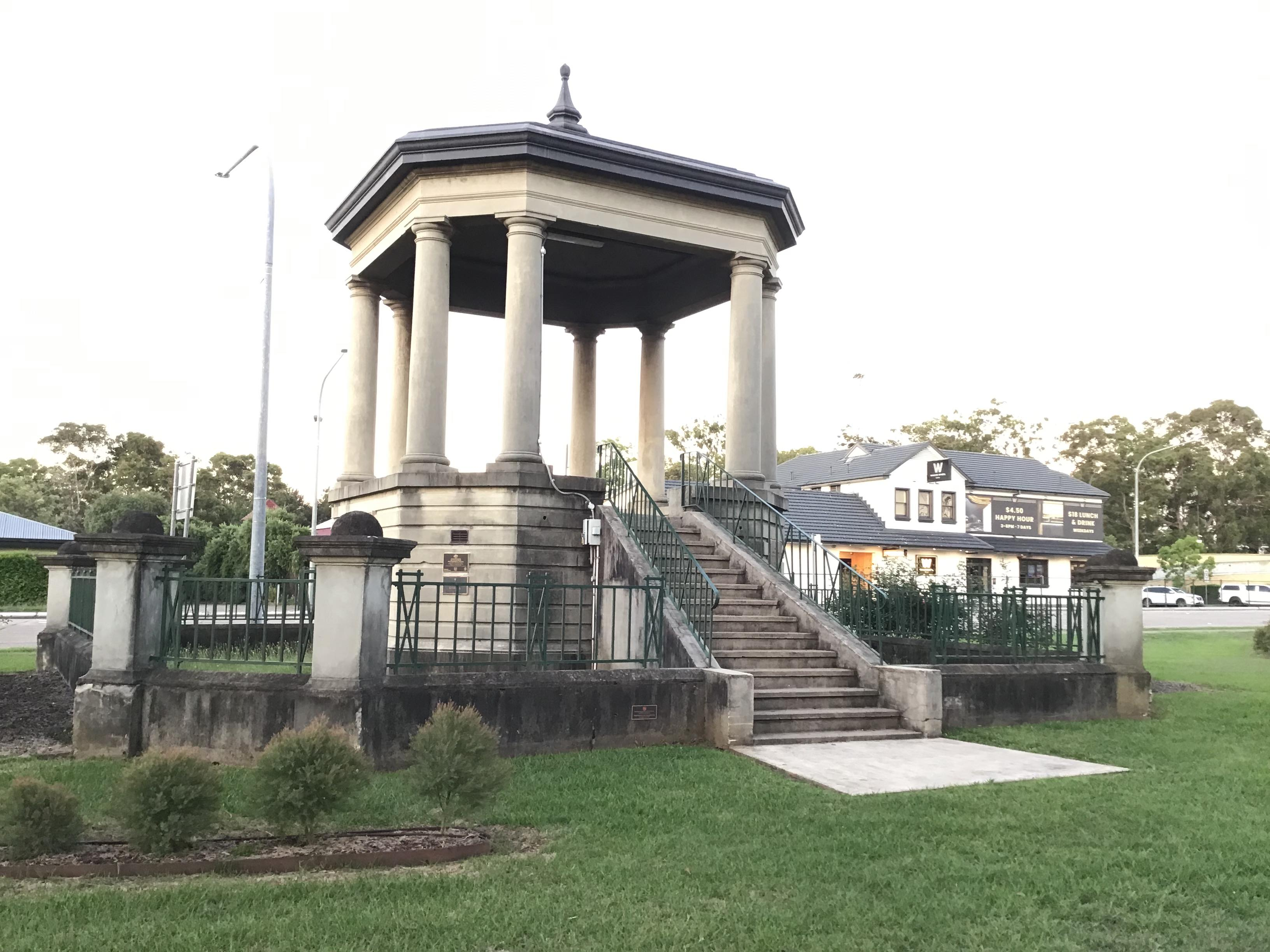
St Marys War Memorial, along Great Western highway. The memorial was built in honour of the deceased war veterans who perished during the First (1914 - 1918) and Second World (1939 -1945) Wars, the Korean war (1950 - 1953), the Vietnam War (1955 - 1975), and the Malayan Emergency (1948 - 1960)

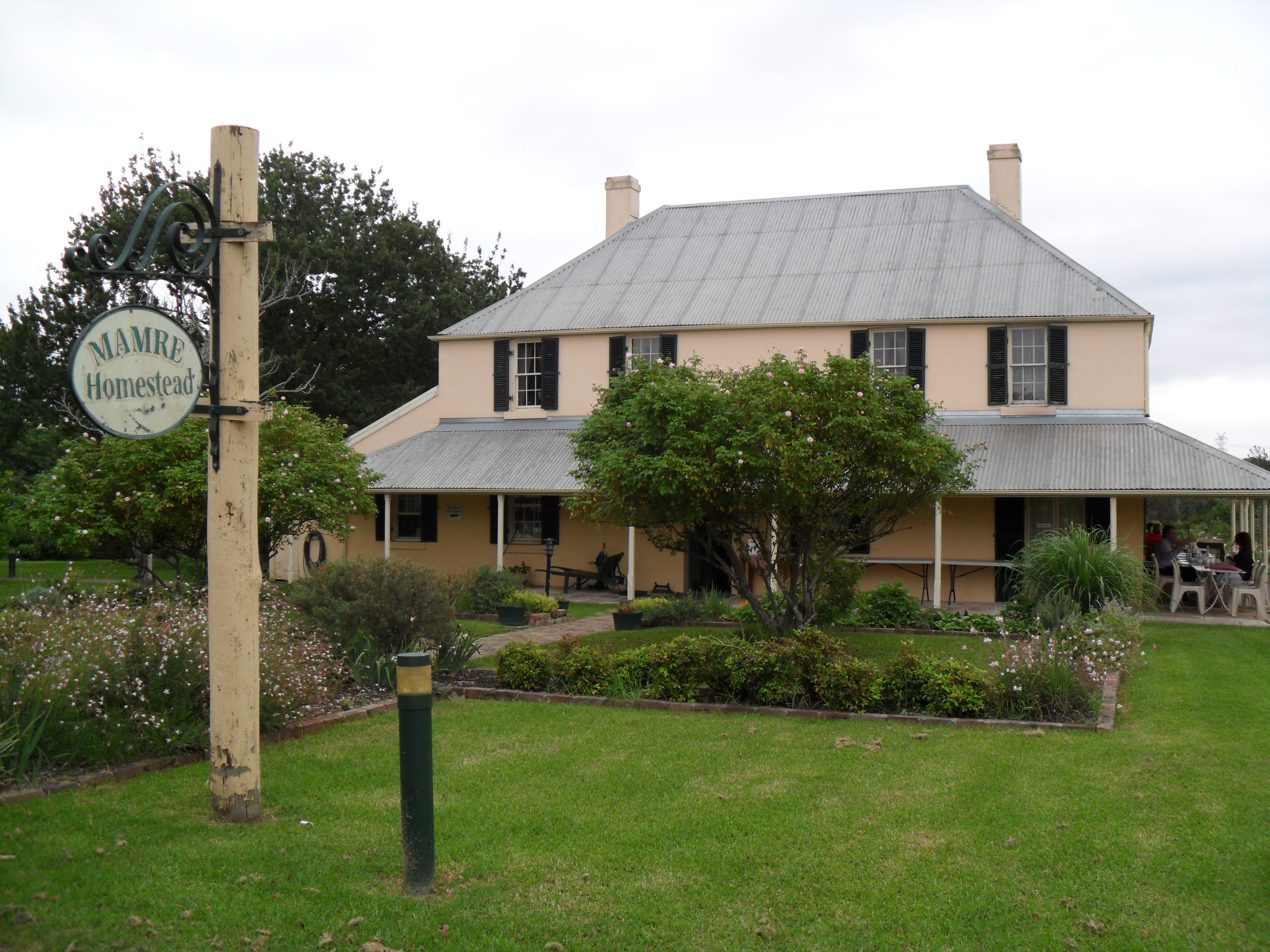
Mamre Homestead. Once owned by Samuel Marsden, the property is now listed on the NSW State Heritage Register

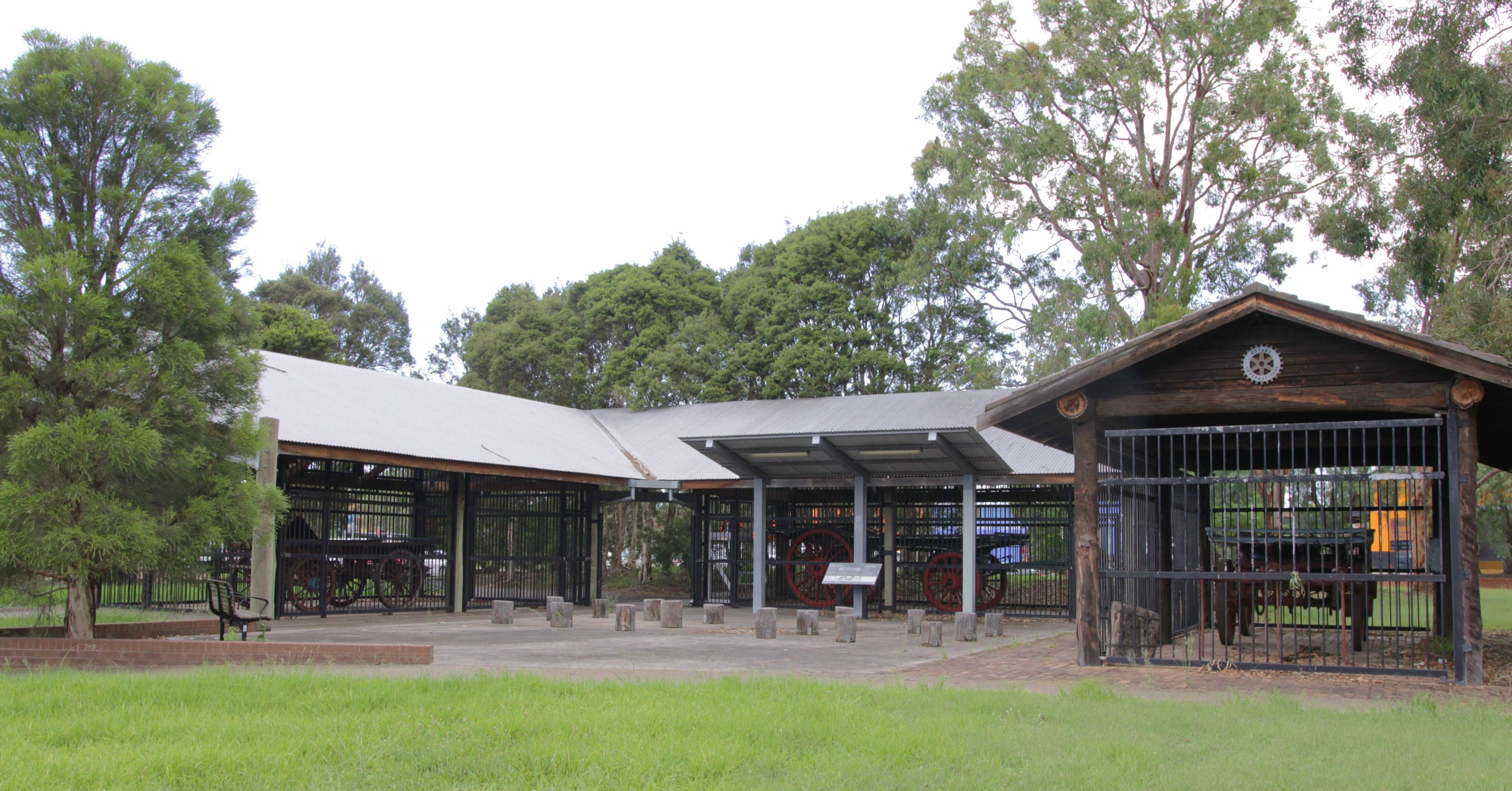
The outdoor Bennett Wagon exhibit at South Creek park, near the western limit of St Marys. There are three wagons within the enclosure, outdoor seating, and a plaque outlining the history of the Bennett Wagon Works significance to the suburb.

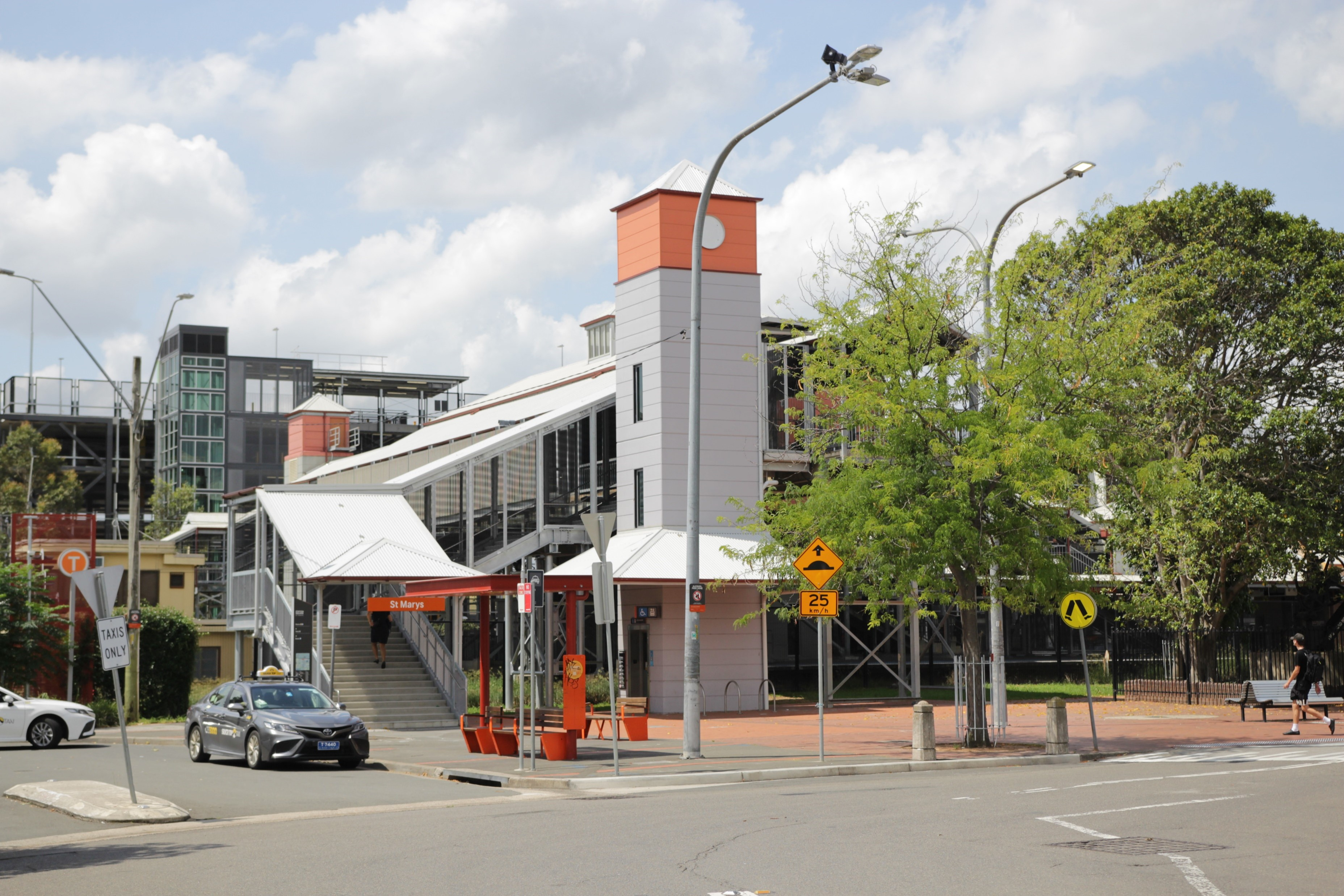
The southern entrance of St Marys train station after the metro line renovation. The tower, which once sported a functioning clock face, is now bare. In the background is a multi-storey carpark on the northern entrance of the station, beyond which is North St Marys - the industrial half of the suburb.

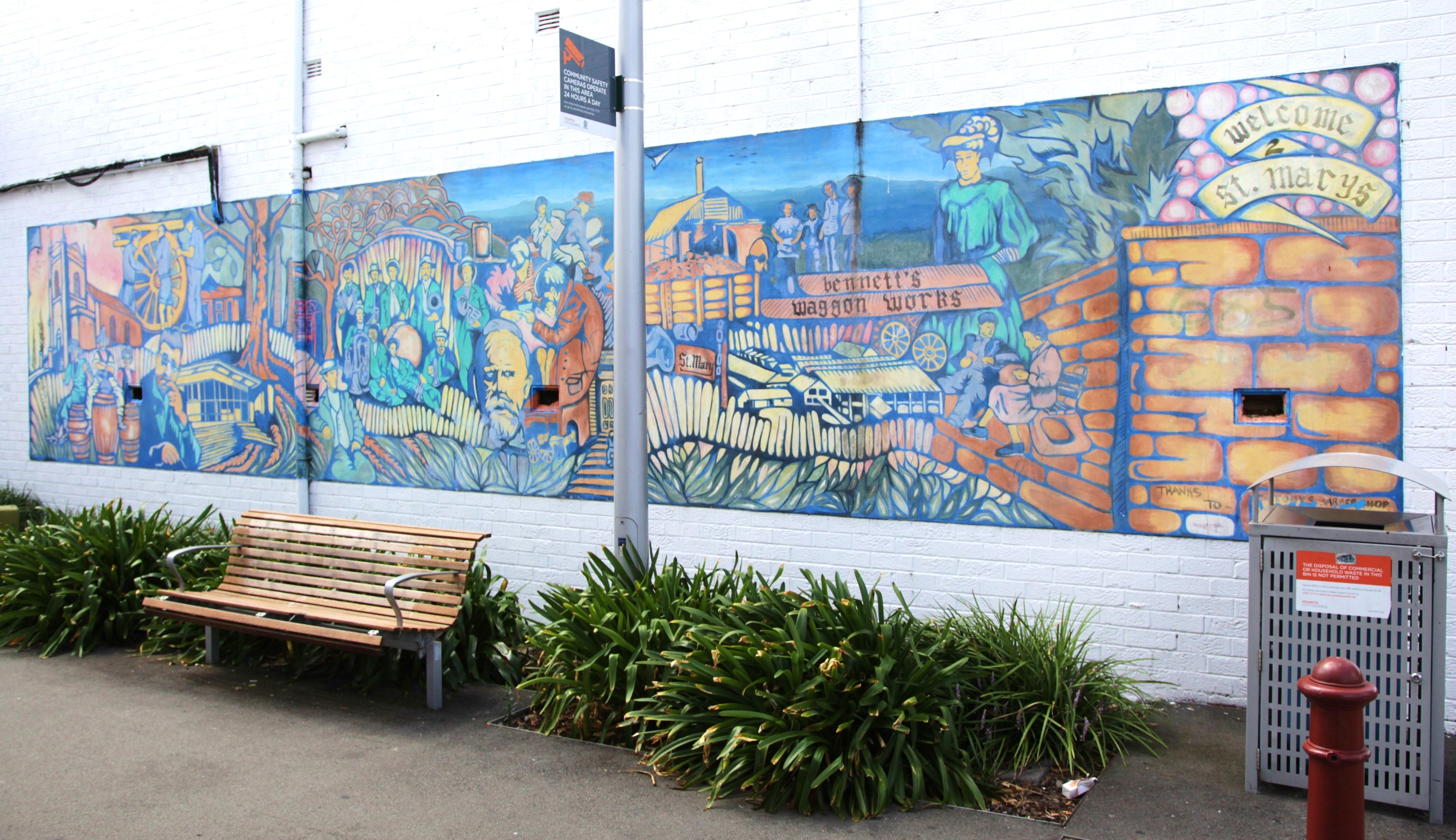
One of two painted historical murals in St Marys near Queen Street. Several icons of the suburb's history and landmarks are depicted, such as Bennett's Wagon Works, St Marys Magdalene Church, tannery workshops, the St Marys District Band, and possibly the post office

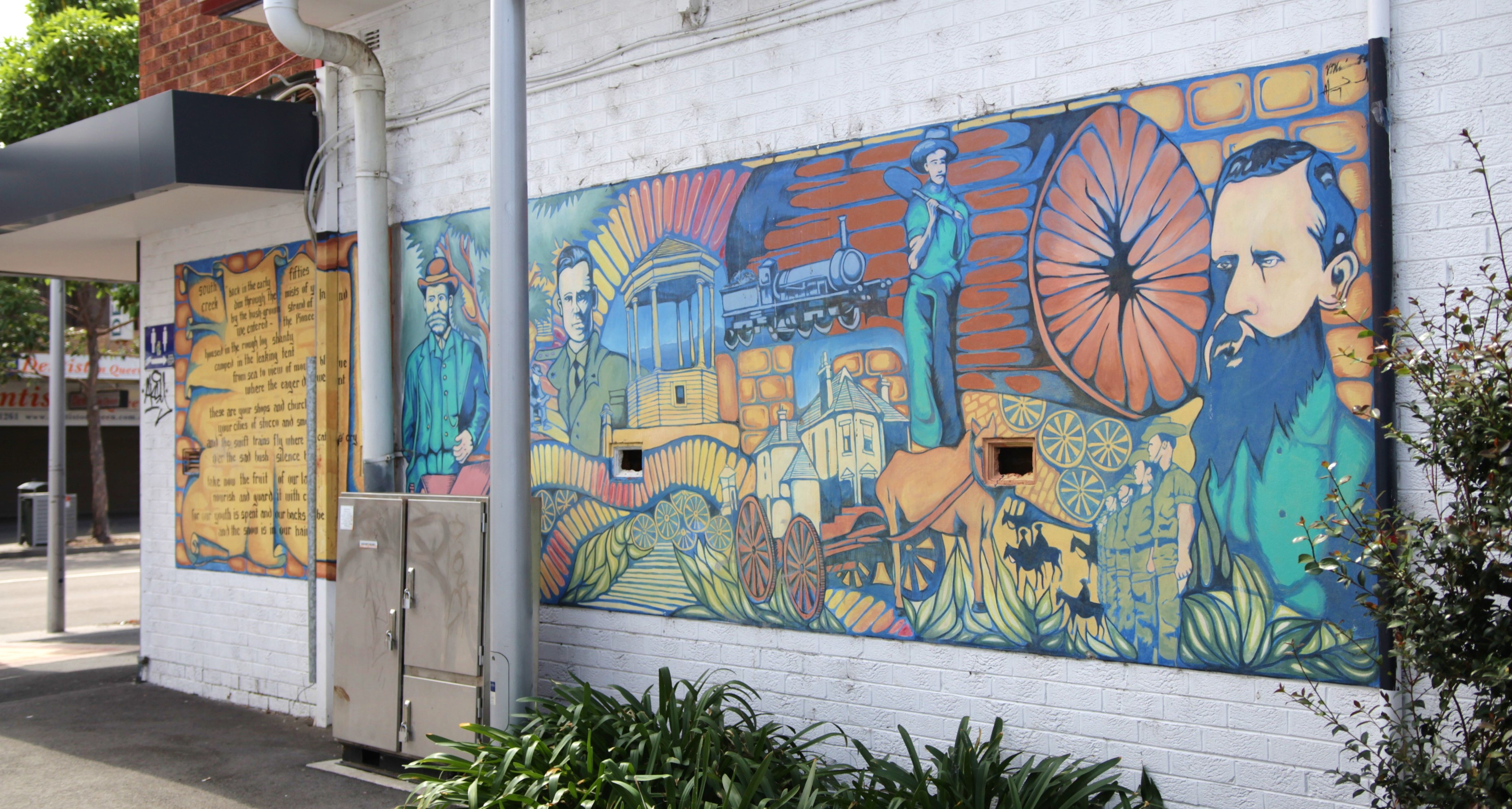
One of two painted historical murals in St Marys. The leftmost section recites a poem titled 'South Creek' which tells of the rough journey that the pioneers made - from the eastern shoreline of Sydney, inland towards the Blue Mountains - and legacy of their settlements that they passed to their descendants. The right two-thirds of the mural depict the heritage-listed Mimosa house, the War Memorial in Victoria Park, one of Bennett works' wagons, and several persons of historical note

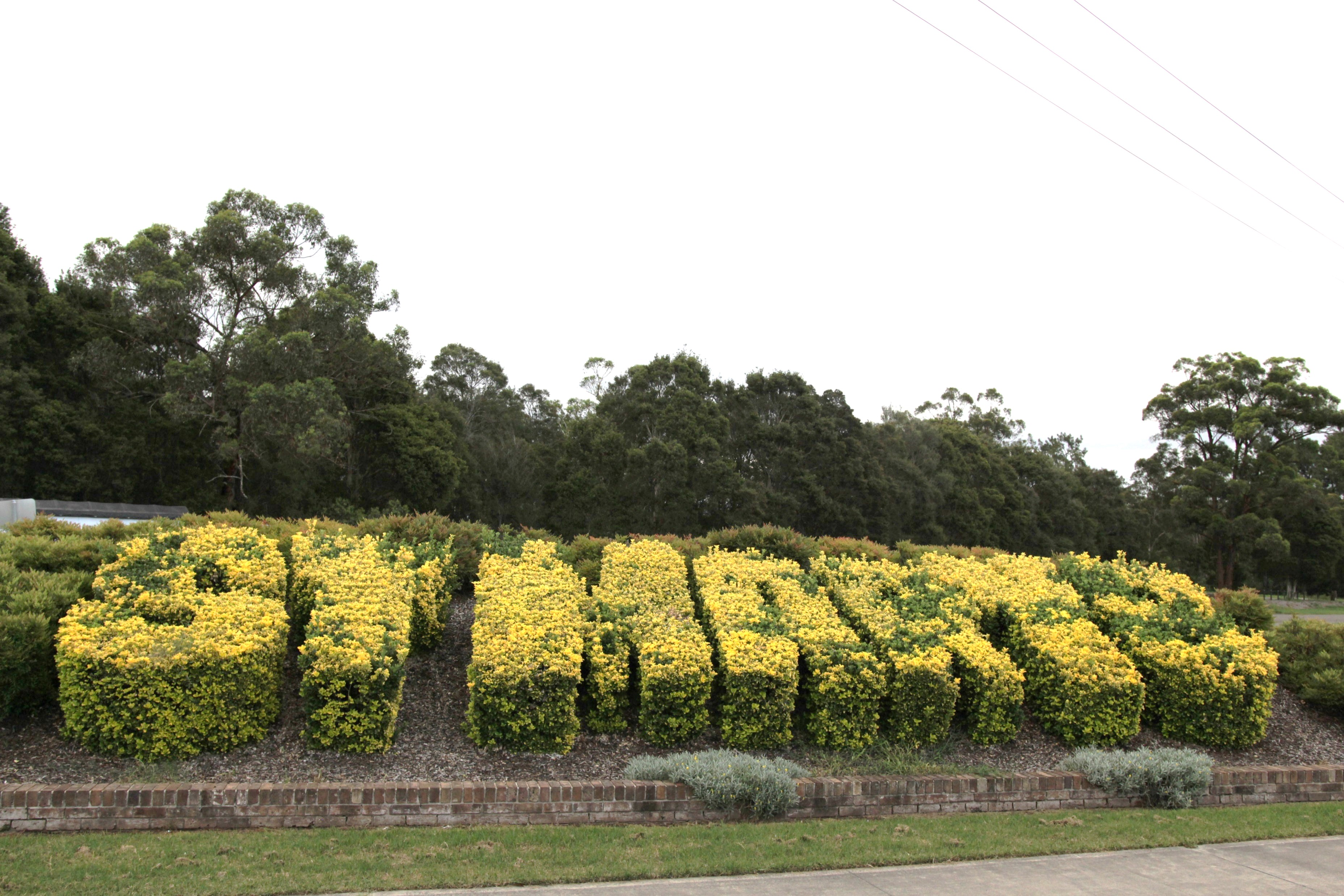
Landmark decorative hedge that spells 'St Marys', situated on the corner of South Creek Park, near the western end of the suburb

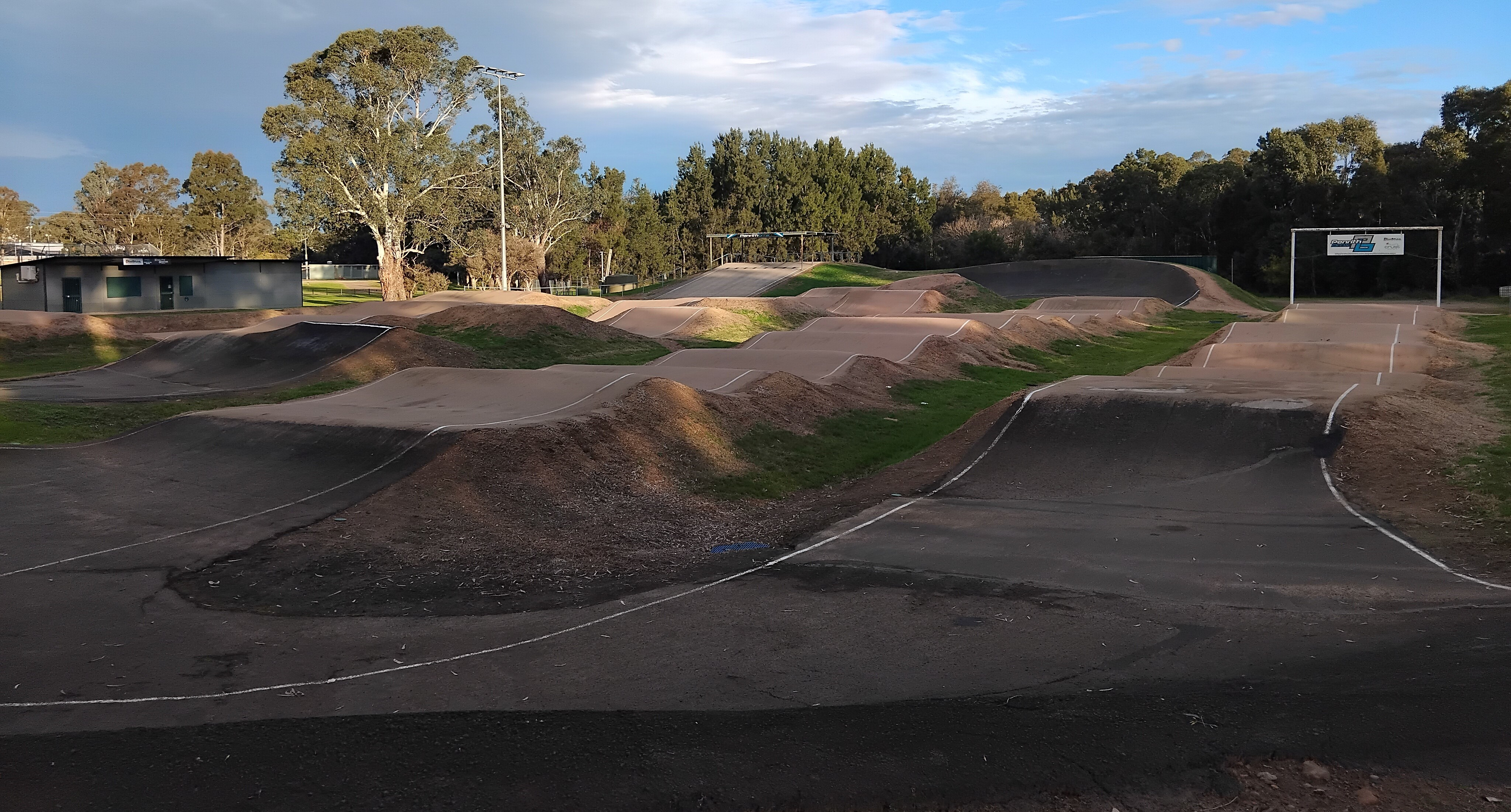
A BMX pump race track. The track lies next to Blair Oval athletics field, which is situated to the west of the train station.

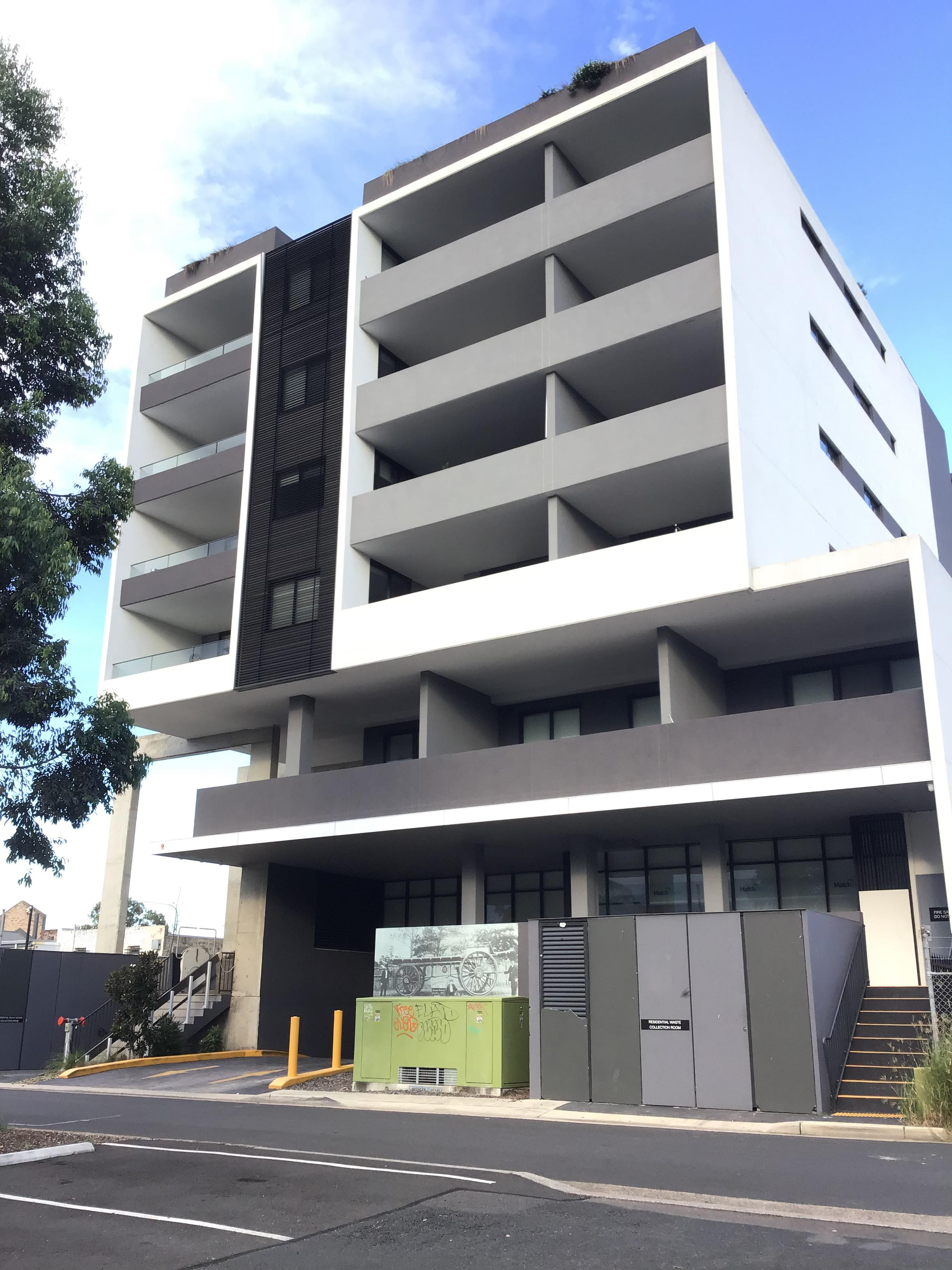
One of the new multi-storey apartment buildings in St Marys, a result of development in anticipation of the new metro line to the Badgerys Creek Aerotropolis. There is also a large print photo depicting a Bennett wagon (lower middle) - a remembrance of the suburb's past in the wake of progress and modernization

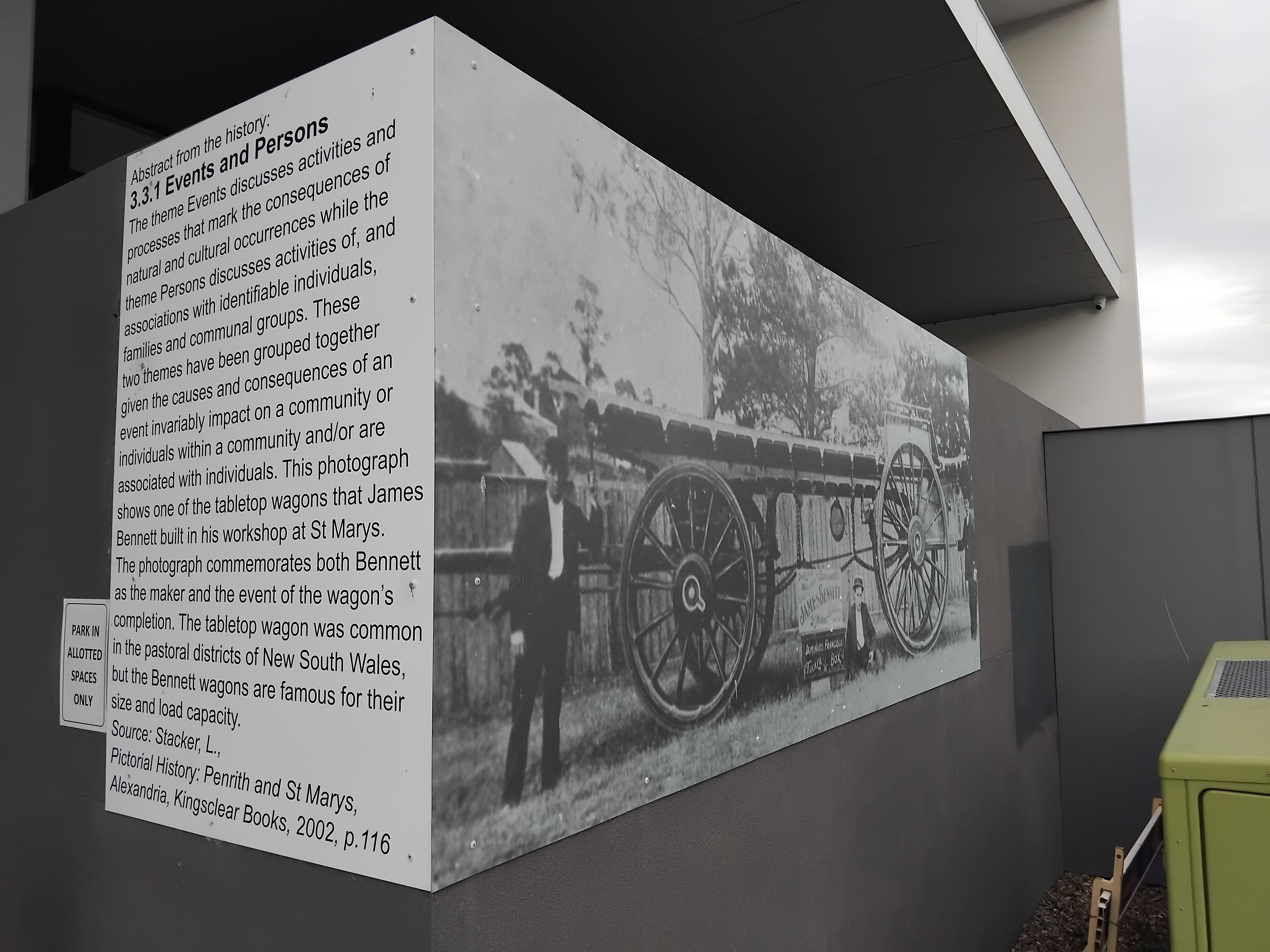
Graphic and caption depicting one of James Bennett's wagons, specifically a 'tabletop wagon'.

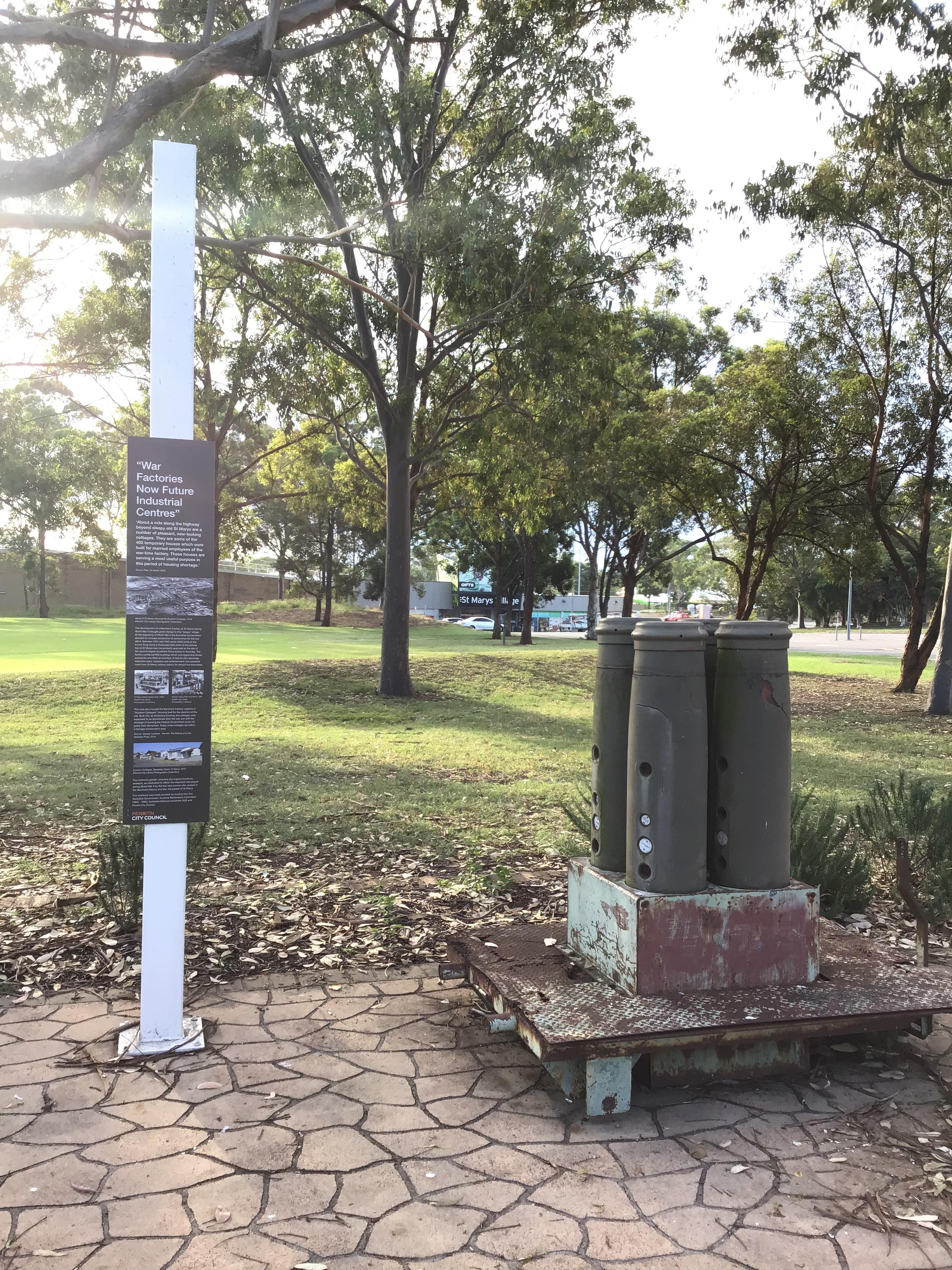
A small memorial within Lang Park, west of Queen street, which commemorates the men and women who worked at the St Marys munitions factory during World War II. A sign is inscribed with the story of the factory's development during the war and the significance of its remnants in the present day; beside the sign is a trolley carrying four bomb shell casings

== Demographics ==
Historical population
Year	Pop.	±%
2001	9,207	—
2006	9,717	+5.5%
2011	10,961	+12.8%
2016	12,195	+11.3%
2021	13,256	+8.7%

According to the 2021 census, there were 13,256 people in St Marys.

- Aboriginal and Torres Strait Islander people made up 4.6% of the population.
- The most common ancestries were Australian 23.5%, English 22.0%, Filipino 6.2%, Irish 5.5% and Scottish 4.6%
- 56.9% of people were born in Australia. The next most common countries of birth were the Philippines 4.6%, New Zealand 3.7%, India 3.7%, England 1.5% and Fiji 1.5%.
- 59.0% of people spoke only English at home. Other languages spoken at home included Arabic 2.9%, Tagalog 2.5%, Samoan 1.9%, Hindi 1.6% and Filipino 1.4%.
- The most common responses for religion were Catholic 25.6%, No Religion 23.0%, Anglican 9.4% and Islam 5.5%, a further 10.8% of people elected not to disclose their religion.

== Industrial area ==
The northern half of St Marys, demarcated by the train line, is the site of numerous industrial and trade businesses, along with smaller specialist enterprises, most of which are situated alongside or branch from Glossop and Forrester roads.

The automotive industry has a major presence with wreckers, multiple kinds of workshops (paint, body, tyre and auto, brake and clutch, electrical, etc.), and car dealerships operating in the area.

Waste treatment facilities also occupy north St Marys, with several major sites as follows:

- Cleanaway St Marys Liquid Waste Services (provides waste disposal and treatment services for both households and businesses)
- Penrith City Council's Community Recycling Centre (council drop-off point for hazardous household waste to be disposed of in a safe manner)
- Sydney Water's 'St Marys Advanced Water Treatment Plant' (government water treatment facility that processes 60 Megalitres of water daily)

== Commercial area ==
The commercial area in the southern half of St Marys is primarily on and around Queen Street, with a collection of both franchised and independently-owned establishments lining both sides of the thoroughfare. There are also some businesses along Railway Street adjacent to the southern side of train station, and a few along the Great Western Highway such as Aldi, Dominoes, a medical center, and the St Marys Band Club.

=== St Marys Village Shopping Centre ===
St Marys Village Shopping Centre is located on Charles Hackett Drive. This sub-regional centre includes Woolworths, Target and over 40 specialty stores. The centre provides convenient shopping over a single level with easily accessible ground level parking. Within the shopping centre is a community noticeboard, in the corridor opposite the centre management office.

=== Station Plaza ===
Station Plaza was a shopping centre which included a Coles Supermarket, around 16 specialty stores, and an undercover car park. It was located on Phillip Street opposite the St Marys train station and bus depot. The plaza and carpark were demolished in early 2023 to clear the land for the new Metro Station as part of the Aerotropolis and Metro line development plan.

=== Hotels ===
St Marys Hotel is located on Queen Street. The hotel opened in 1955 and was originally the St Marys Rex Hotel.

The Wagon Wheel Hotel is another local pub/accommodation and derives its name from 'Bennet's Coach & Waggon Works', the business that was operated by brothers George T and James Jr. Bennet and which was situated near Queen Street from 1875 until its closure in 1920 (or 1858-1954 depending on the source). Although initially named 'The Waggon Wheel' from its establishment in 1859 by James William Bennet (the father of George T and James Jr.), the hotel was renamed after the first world war to 'The Park View', but reverted back to 'The Waggon Wheel' in 1959. The name again changed back to 'Park View' in the late 90s', then to 'King of the Mountain' in 2006, and finally to 'The Wagon Wheel Hotel' which it is currently known as.

On the north side of St Marys is the Holiday Inn, which has a modern design and is adjacent to the St Marys leagues club.

== Arts and culture ==
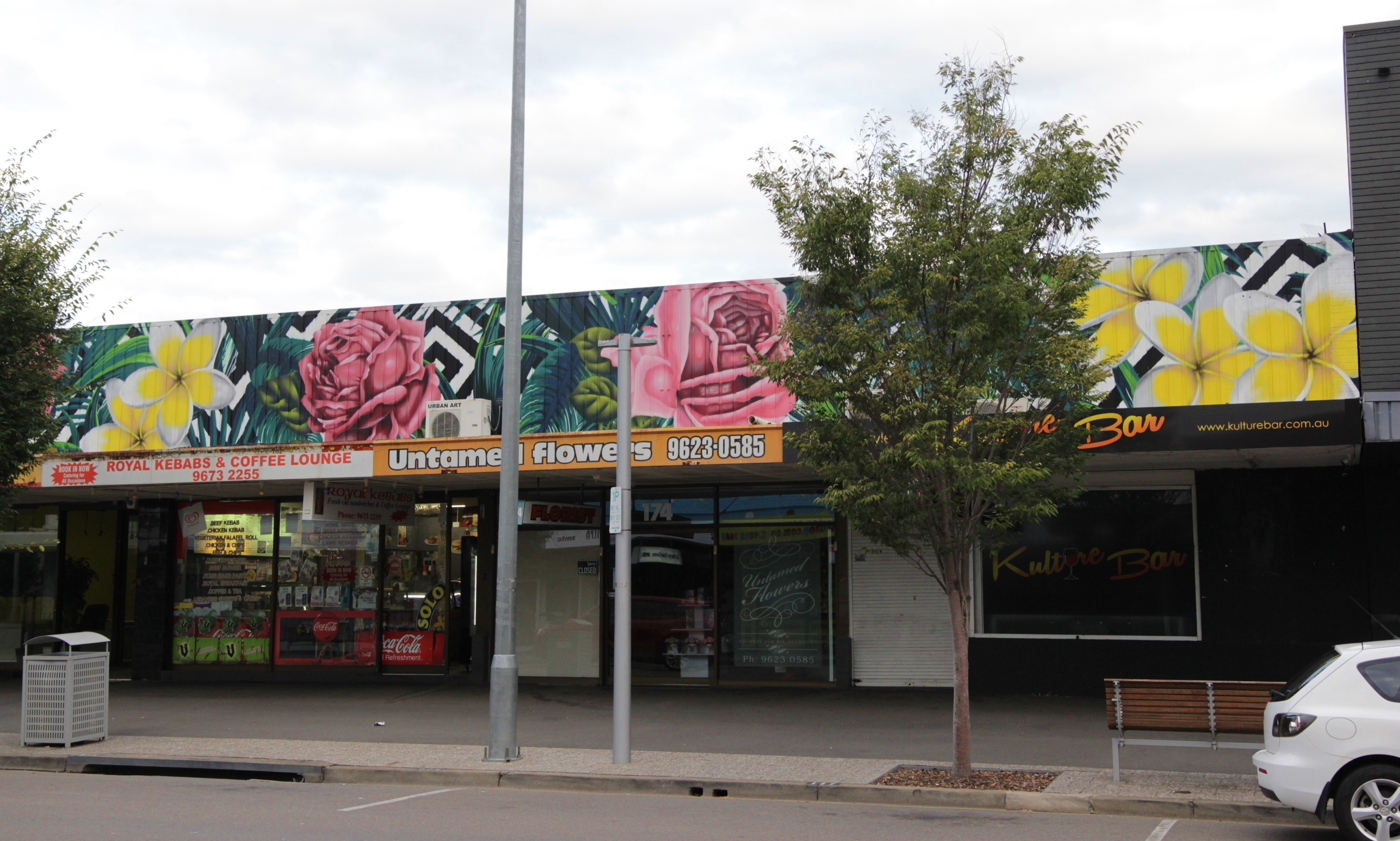
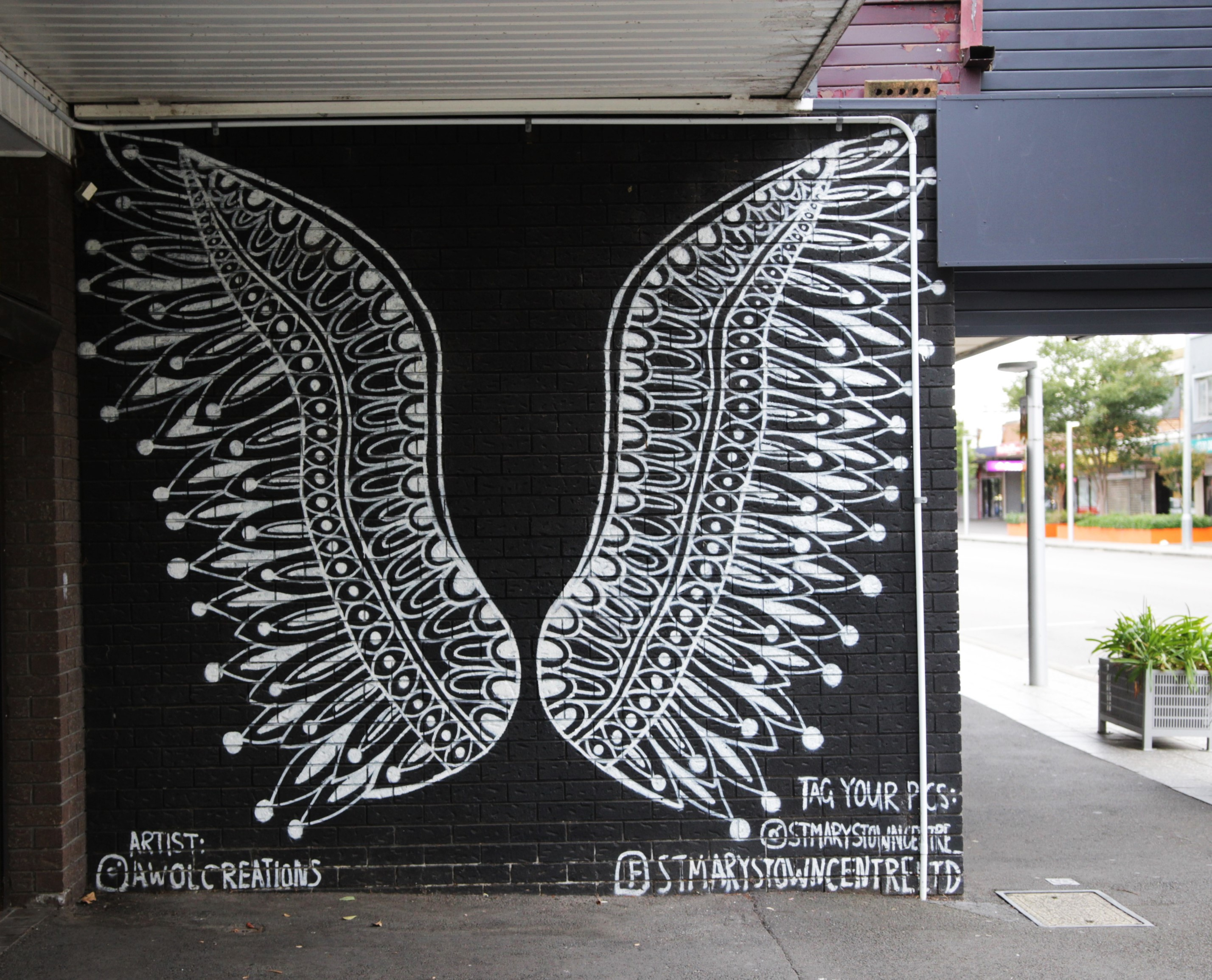
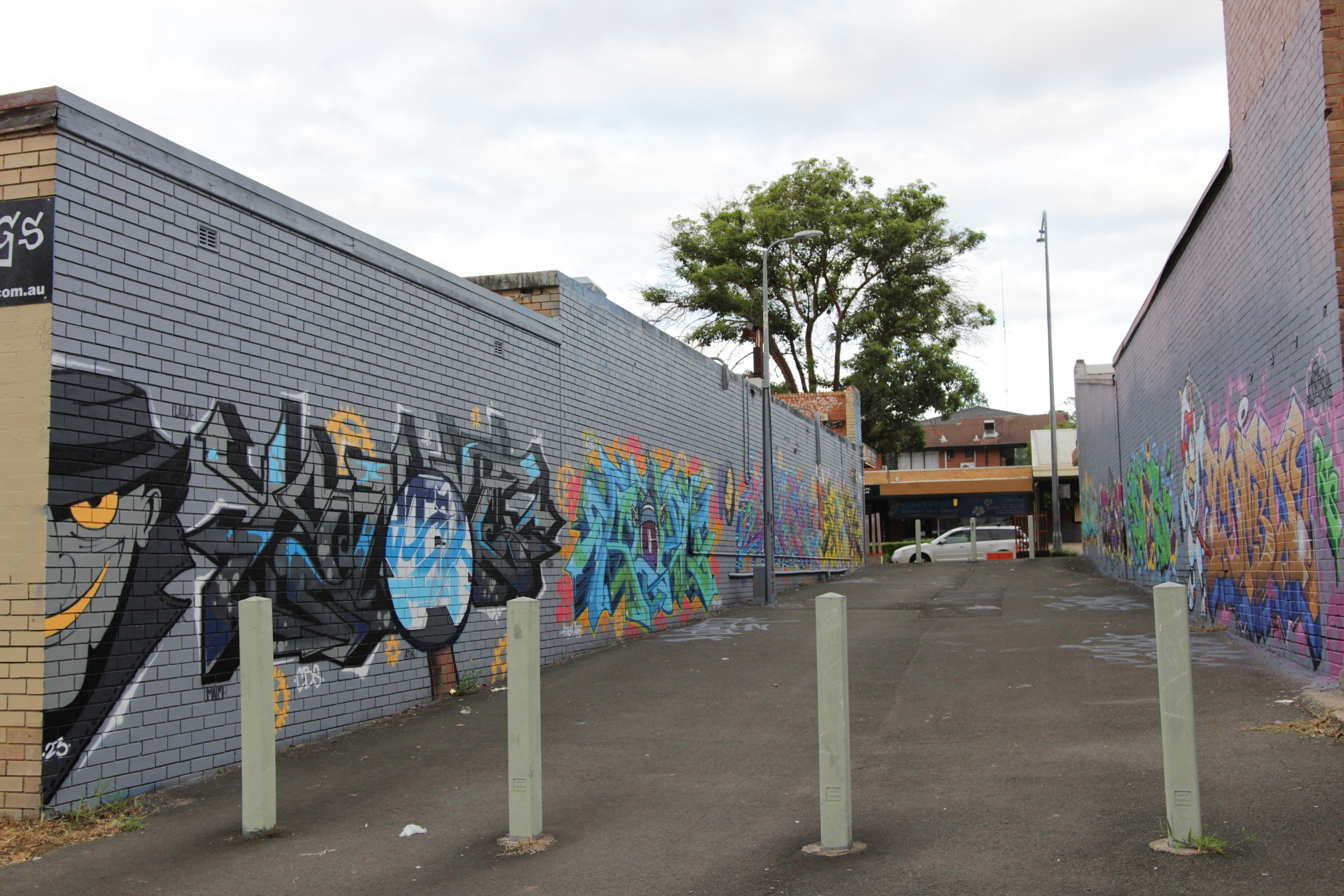
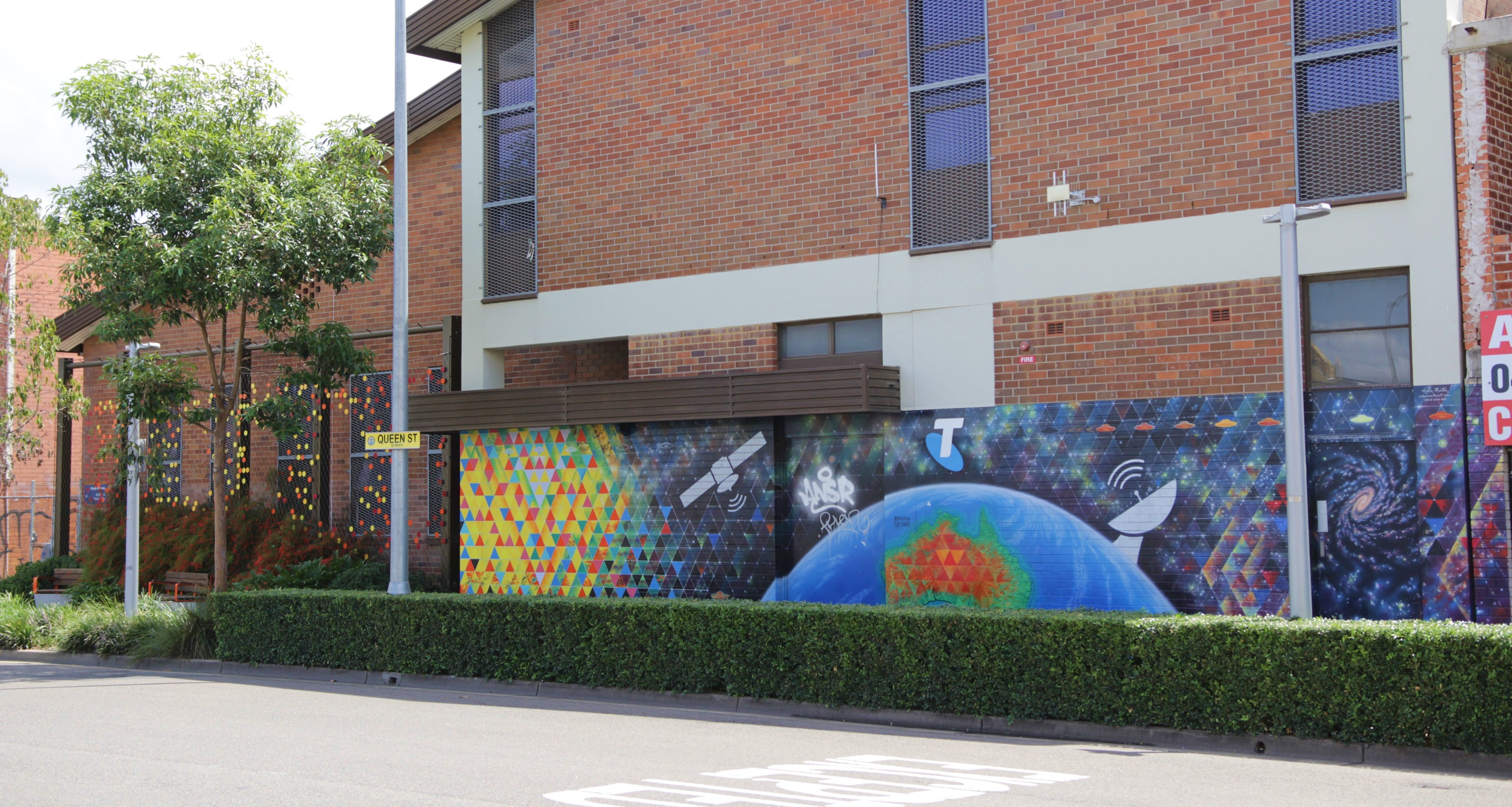
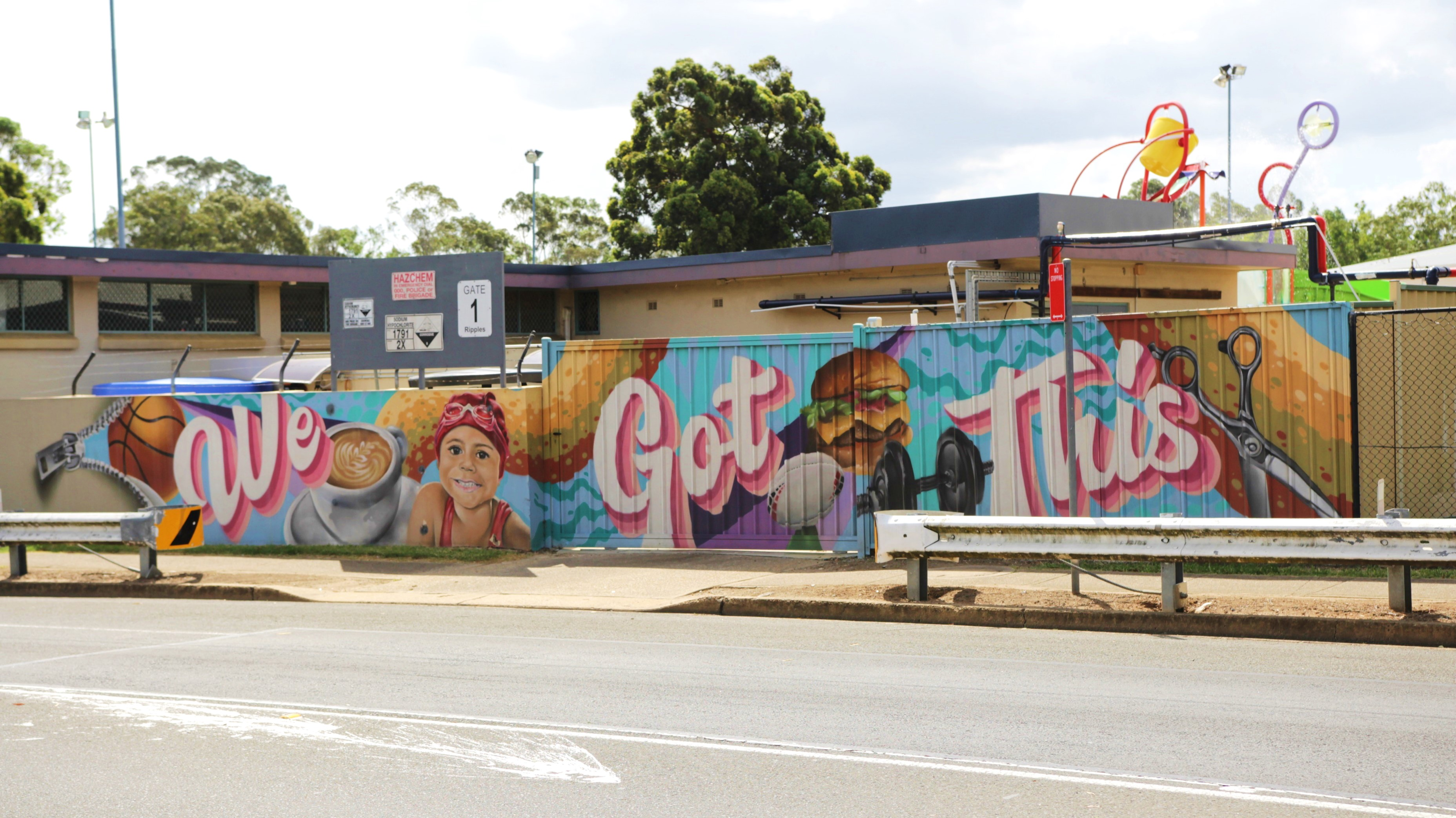
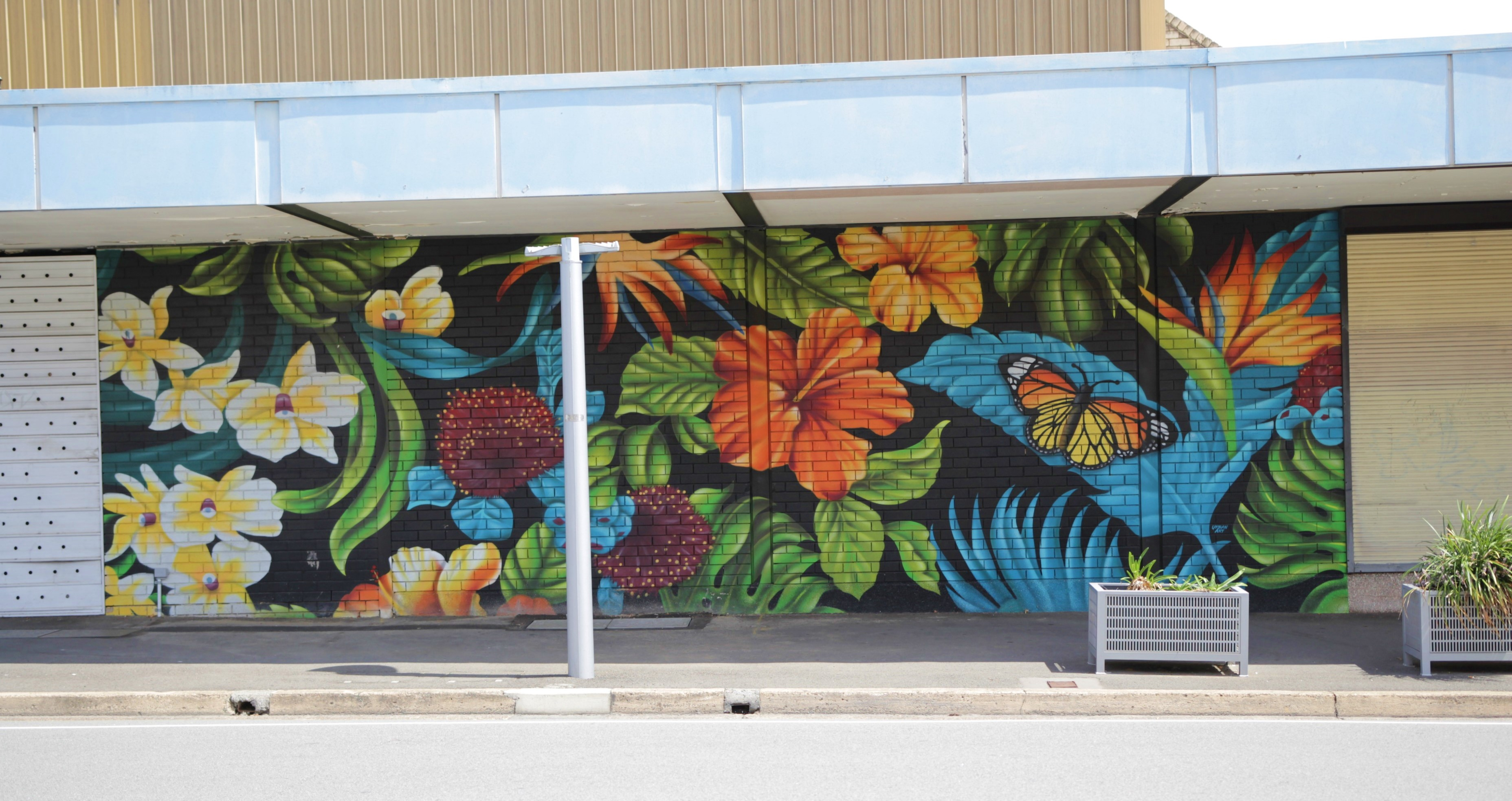
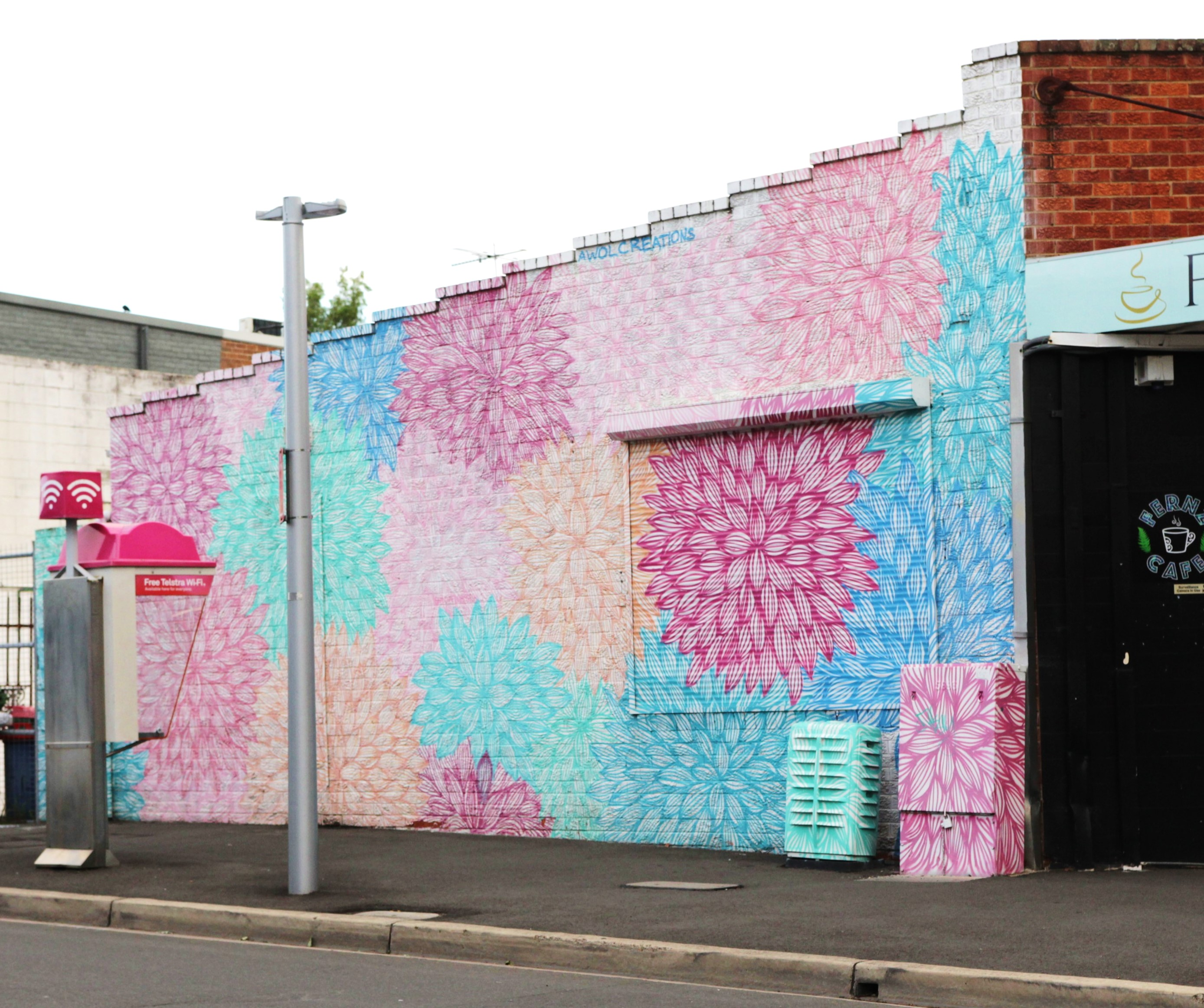
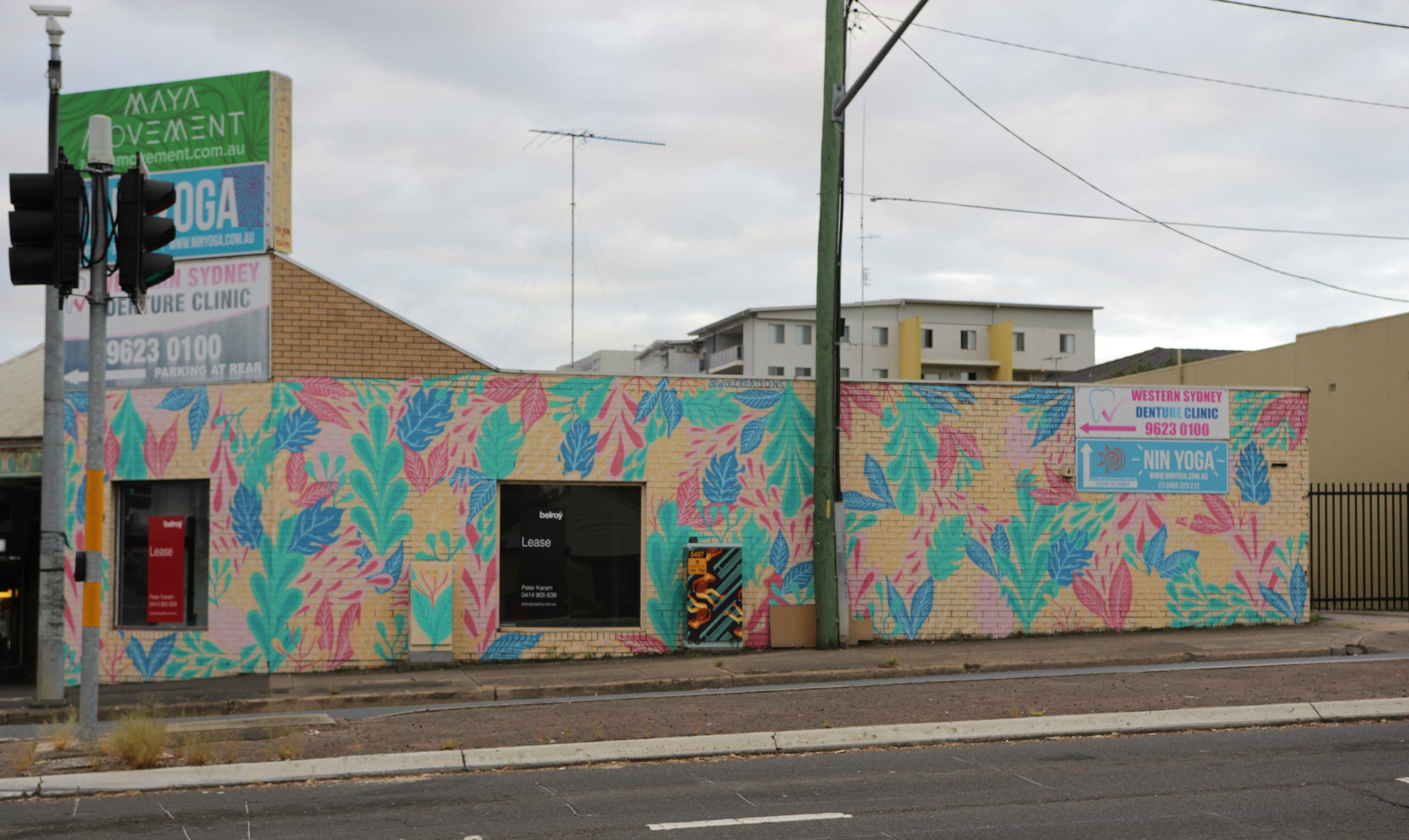
Artistic painted murals along and around Queen Street

There is a small arts scene in St Marys, with sections of Queen Street being adorned in murals designed by independent artists, likely commissioned by the local council. Many of these can be viewed on a single walking route or 'street art trail'.

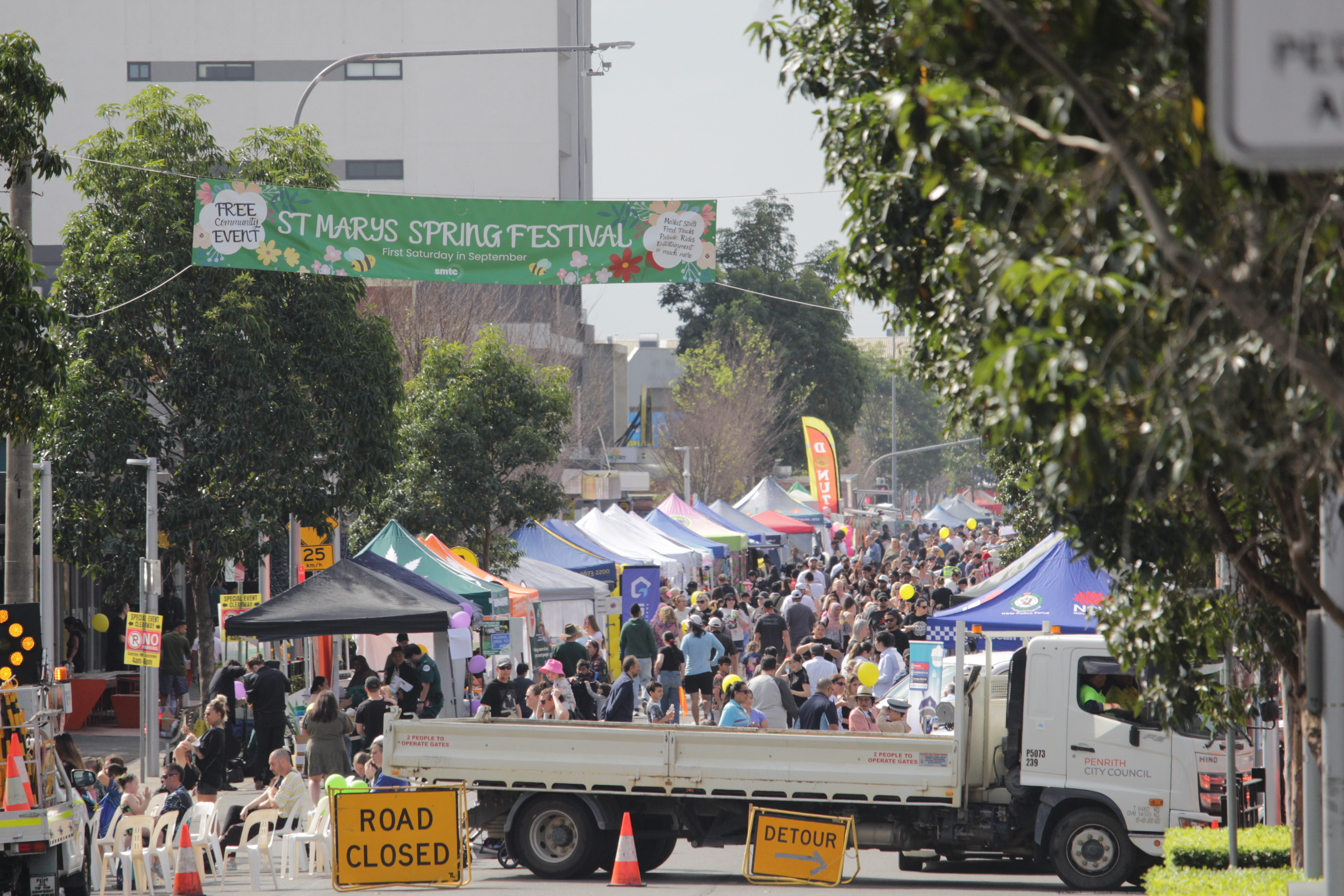
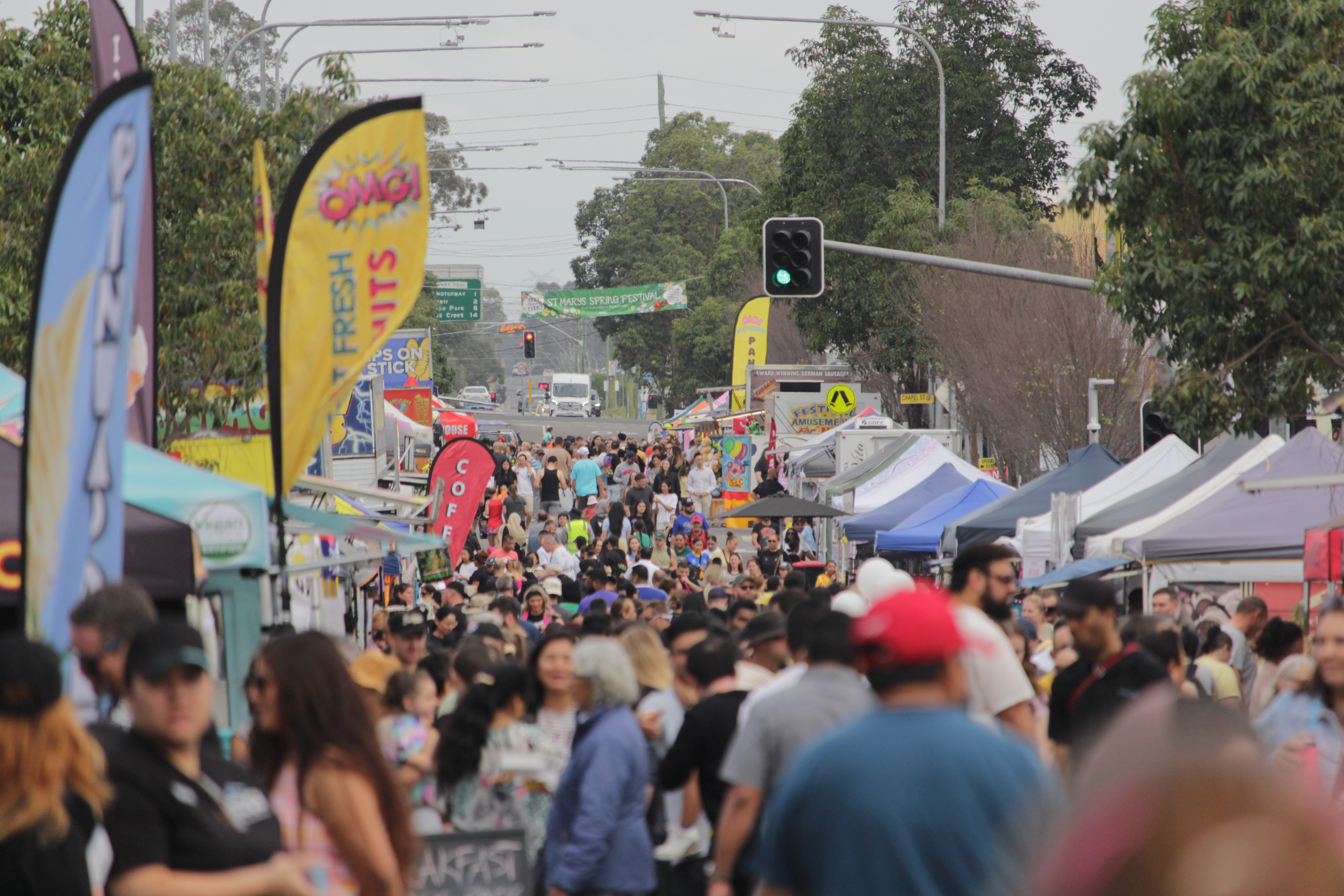
The 2024 St Marys Spring Festival, situated along most of Queen Street's length

Open-air concerts, holiday events, and family-friendly activities are often held in Coachmans park, around the middle of Queen Street. During the annual Spring Festival, Queen Street itself is cordoned off from traffic to allow pedestrians to freely roam the setups along the street, where a parade also takes place that includes a convoy of vintage automobiles, walking groups of local organisations, and marching bands.

In addition, the St Marys Corner Community and Cultural Precinct ('The Corner') is situated on the corner of the Great Western Highway and Mamre Road, just beyond Queen Street. The Corner is the site of several facilities including an arts and crafts studio, community centre and hall, the Nepean Multicultural Access organization, and the former site of the local council chambers (now relocated to St Marys Library).

The former council chamber building at St Marys Corner now houses the St Marys & District Historical Society, which acts as the suburb's museum; it contains numerous photographs, displays, and artifacts that depict life in St Marys since the 19th century. The society itself is volunteer-run and open to the public on certain days or by appointment.

The Nepean Multicultural Access centre provides an assortment of community and social services, particularly for Culturally and Linguistically Diverse demographics. The centre also holds scheduled activities including English conversation classes, indoor boules, sewing & needlework, pottery, painting, and gentle exercise sessions.

== Leisure and recreation ==
St Marys is home to several activity and leisure centres, including:

- Don Bosco Youth Centre (multisport recreation centre that contains an indoor soccer court, basketball courts, table tennis, snooker, foosball tables, trampolines)
- Ripples Leisure Centre (indoor and outdoor swimming pools, fitness centre, hydrotherapy)
  - Within the same vicinity as Ripples are outdoor tennis courts and a BMX pump racetrack
- Go Bananas Family Entertainment Centre (indoor soft playground and early learning centre)
- Skypeak Adventures (outdoor treetop-adventure style aerial obstacle course)
- St Marys Indoor Shooting Centre (indoor firearms and archery shooting range)
- National Indoor Sports/St Marys Indoor Sports and Recreation (indoor courts-for-hire that offer netball, soccer/futsal, football/oztag, etc.)

Additionally, the nearby Troy Adams Archery Field in the adjacent suburb of Werrington is used by the Penrith City Archers club, which caters to newcomers and archers of varying skill levels.

== Transport ==
The M4 Motorway sits along the southern boundary with entrance and exit ramps to Mamre Road leading to St Marys Town Centre (North) and the St Clair estate (South). The Great Western Highway is the major East–west road in the suburb. Sydney Street and Marsden Road are on the northern and southern boundaries.

St Marys is also serviced by a regular passenger rail service along the main western railway line with St Marys station forming a major local public transport hub combining rail, bus and taxi services.

Dunheved is a major industrial, and commercial centre to the north. Between March 1942 and March 1986 Dunheved was served by a branch rail line that left the main western line approximately 200 metres west of St Marys station as part of the Ropes Creek branch line that was constructed to serve the munitions works formerly operated by Australian Defence Industries. While the rail infrastructure was left in place for many years after the closure, other than Dunheved Station platform and Ropes Creek Station (within the Ropes Crossing estate), nothing remains of this branch line beyond Christie Street.

== Schools ==
- St Marys Primary School
- South St Marys Public School
- Kurambee School (Special Ed.)
- Our Lady of the Rosary Primary School
- St Marys Senior High School
