= Mamre (homestead) =

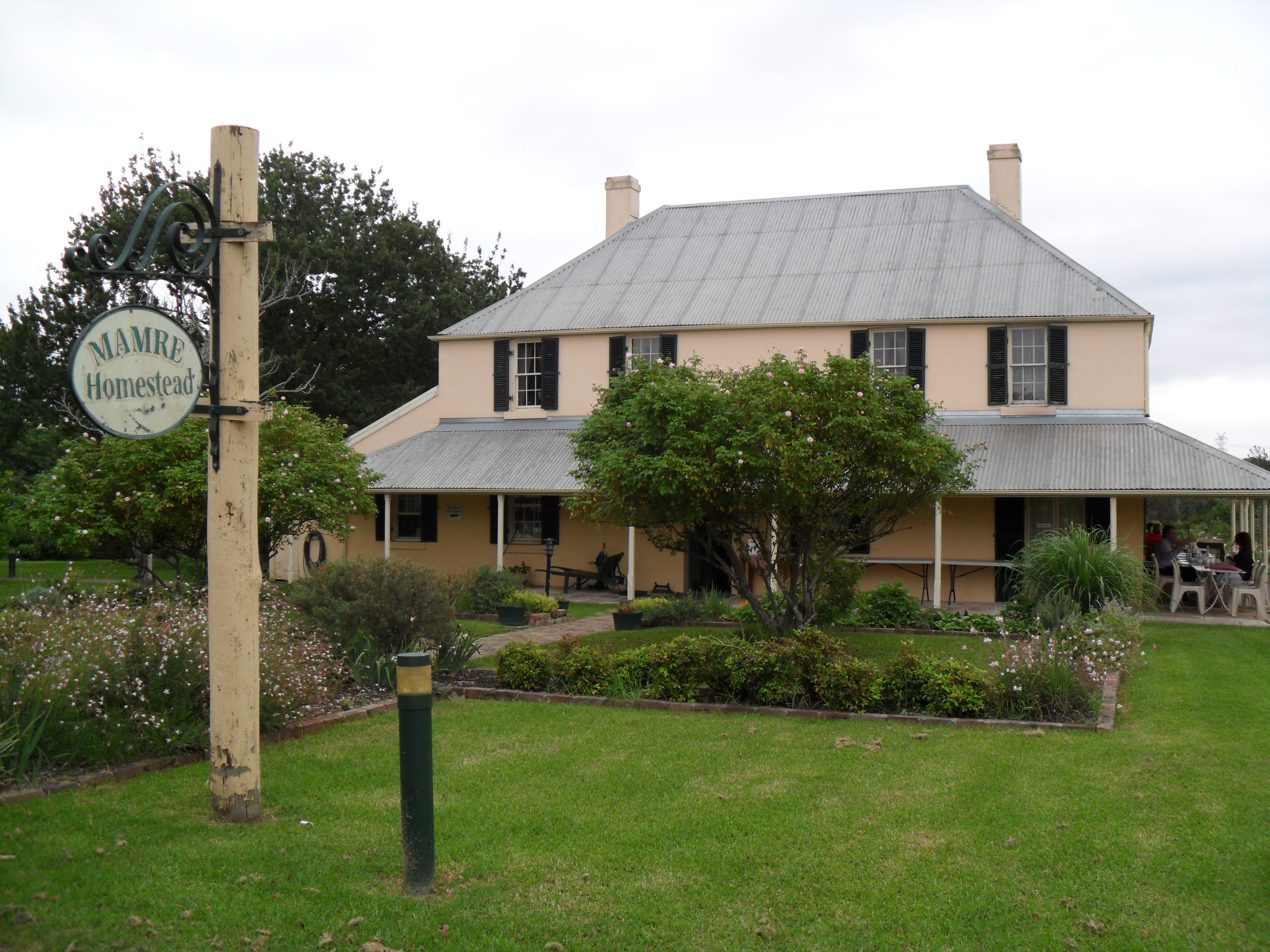
- Mamre, pictured in 2013
- Interactive map of the Mamre area
- Etymology: Genesis 13:18

General information
- Status: Completed
- Type: Homestead
- Architectural style: Colonial Georgian
- Location: Mamre Road, Orchard Hills, City of Penrith, Sydney, New South Wales, Australia
- Coordinates: 33°47′25″S 150°46′04″E
- Construction started: 1822
- Completed: 1832; 194 years ago
- Renovated: 1949; 1984
- Owner: Department of Planning and Infrastructure

Technical details
- Material: Sandstone

Renovating team
- Architects: Lindsay, Thompson and Spooner (1949); Howard Tanner and Associates (1984)

Website
- mamre.com.au

New South Wales Heritage Register
- Official name: Mamre
- Type: State heritage (landscape)
- Designated: 2 April 1999
- Reference no.: 264
- Type: Farm
- Category: Farming and Grazing

Mamre is a heritage-listed former farm homestead complex, grain cropping, pastoral property and wool production and now residence, community facility, market gardening and nursery production located at Mamre Road in the western Sydney suburb of Orchard Hills in the City of Penrith local government area of New South Wales, Australia. It was built from 1822 to 1832. The property is owned by the New South Wales Department of Planning and Infrastructure. It was added to the New South Wales State Heritage Register on 2 April 1999.

== History ==
In 1798 colonial chaplain, magistrate and pastoralist, The Rev. Samuel Marsden purchased 15 hectares (38 acres) from a lapsed grantee at South Creek where he commenced experimental wool production activities. The name comes from Genesis 13:18 "Mamre which is in Hebron" (meaning land which is promised).

He established the Mamre farm in 1799 with the purchase of a further 81 hectares (200 acres), also at South Creek.

By 1802 Marsden's total land holdings at South Creek amounted to 135 hectares (333 acres), primarily devoted to wool production. It was the working farmhouse of a busy rural property, a model farm which comprised orchards, exotic pasture and other crops.

In 1804 Marsden received a 417-hectare (1,030-acre) grant, again at South Creek and he proceeded to plant experimental crops of hemp and flax. Flooding in 1805 destroyed the experimental crops but experimental wool production continued and in 1807 Marsden left for England taking with him the first "weavable" wool from the Colony, produced at Mamre.

Between 1822 and 1832 the homestead at Mamre was built and the farm itself became firmly established. The house was not intended as a permanent residence, but rather as a country cottage to provide basic accommodation for the overseers of the farm.

Originally a storage barn for wool, Mamre Homestead was built in the 1820s from brick and was noted for its cultivated rose and cottage gardens. The Rev. James Hassell said of it:

"Mamre, where I spent so many happy days with my uncle, was a farm on the South Creek... The house was a two-storey brick building with a good gravel drive in front. Beyond, several hundred yards, was a splendid orchard of twenty acres. The fruits surpassed any that I have seen these forty years. The grapes, chiefly muscatel, were very fine. Peaches, apples, pears, oranges, apricots and nectarines, were in abundance. Supplies were constantly sent to Sydney, in the season, in waggon-loads and sold well. Large crops of wheat, and oaten hay were produced on the farm. The horses bred at Mamre were very good and sold at high prices. I remember a carriage horse brought a hundred guineas, and few sold under 70 or 80 pounds. The farm and orchard were worked by assigned servants, numbering I should say, from twenty to thirty hands".

— Rev. James Hassell.

In 1838 Samuel Marsden died and ownership of the property passed to his only surviving son, Charles, who used the house as a permanent residence. There are believed to have been between 20 and 30 servants employed to work the farm and orchards at this time.

In 1840 the Mamre farm was sold to Richard Rouse, a prominent public servant and grazier and in 1841 Rouse gave the farm to one of his daughters, Elizabeth Henrietta Rouse, as a wedding present upon her marriage to the Hon. Robert Fitzgerald, MLC of Windsor.

It is said that to be fair to his children, Rouse put three pieces of paper in a straw hat, two of them blank and one bearing the name Mamre. This was drawn by the youngest Daughter, Elizabeth Henrietta.

The property remained in the ownership of the descendants of Robert and Elizabeth for over a century and apart from rendering the external walls in 1890, no significant changes were made to the building until 1950-1 when Professor E. MacLaurin (a descendant of Elizabeth's) added a garage wing, new chimney, a boiler room and laundry as well as replacing the staircase and many of the windows and shutters.

In 1951 the remaining timber outbuildings (a kitchen and wash house) were demolished.

In 1975, the farm was purchased by the (then) NSW Planning and Environment Commission who leased the property to Professor McLaurin until his death in 1978.

In 1984 the NSW Department of Planning made Mamre Homestead and surrounding acreage of 86 hectares (210 acres) available in a 20-year lease to the Sisters of Mercy, Parramatta to be developed as a training centre for the unemployed of the area. The project commenced in 1986. Over the years under the direction of Sister Mary-Louise Petro, Founder of the Mamre Project, several programs have been successfully implemented to meet the perceived needs of time. The NSW Government Department of Families, Housing, Community Services and Indigenous Affairs, together with the Australian Government Department of Family and Community Services and Education, Employment and Workplace Relations now provide funding for the continuing development and delivery of training programs. The present training includes skills in office administration, information technology, hospitality and customer service. Programs are taught in a supportive atmosphere where personal development is encouraged and nurtured. The homestead provides job opportunities in the hospitality industry. Mamre Plains Ltd is a non-profit company set up by the Sisters of Mercy in 1985.

Major restoration works on homestead were completed by October 2016. This is part of the investment provided by the Department's Office of Strategic Lands in preserving heritage-listed properties.

== Description ==
The Mamre homestead, c. 1830, is a two-storey sandstone brick (now rendered) building in the Colonial Georgian style. The house has a hipped corrugated iron roof laid over the original timber shingles. The sandstone flagged timber verandah wrapping around three sides of the building (west, north and east sides) has a bellcast corrugated iron roof. The plan of the house is rectangular, with a central stair hall, eleven rooms and a single storey kitchen wing to the southern side. The windows of the house are timber double hung, with each sash having six panes. Two brick chimneys are located in each end hip.

Some farm outbuildings remain. They are generally timber framed with corrugated iron cladding. There are also a number of modern rendered brick buildings serving the Mamre project and tourism uses. Some remnant early plantings remain around the house. There are white cedars to the north and northwest, Mediterranean cypress to the west, large Canary Island oaks to the southwest, large English oaks to the south, and large kurrajong to the southeast. More recent eucalyptus and pine plantings south of the house have been made, along with a small retail plant nursery area.

=== Condition ===
As at 25 February 1999, the house was restored for the bicentenary in 1988, with the property in good condition overall.

Mamre sites of outbuilding excavations revealed extensive evidence of outbuildings and features around the house.

The main house is relatively intact, with only a few original outbuildings remaining.

== Heritage listing ==
As at 30 March 2000, Mamre is significant for its potential to yield information on the pre-contact Aboriginal occupation of the South Creek catchment. Mamre is historically and socially significant as an important site in post-contact Aboriginal history, demonstrating Aboriginal survival and adaptation to non-traditional social, economic and political practices.

Mamre is historically significant for its association with the early sheep breeding experiments of the Reverend Samuel Marsden, which contributed to the early development of the wool industry in NSW (and Australia). Mamre has historic and aesthetic significance as a rare, regional example of a fairly intact pre-1860 colonial landscape and homestead on the Cumberland Plain. The farmstead is archaeologically significant for its potential to yield information on early colonial farm landscapes, farmsteads and Georgian architecture. The Mamre farmhouse is an iconic feature in the St. Mary's region and immediate landscape.

Mamre has a strong association with the early owners of the property, the Reverend Samuel Marsden and Richard Rouse, both influential early colonists. Samuel Marsden is an important figure in the early missionary history of New Zealand, with strong ties to settlement and missionary activities in Kerikeri and the Northland district in particular. The property has strong, continuing association with the Sisters of Mercy, Parramatta and the MAMRE PROJECT which has great regional social importance.

The South Creek corridor is significant for its preservation of endangered ecological communities. It has potential to yield valuable information about the river-flat forests, wetlands and riparian habitats which are among the most threatened natural landscapes in Western Sydney.

Mamre is recognised as a property of State significance, as a substantial Georgian homestead, and the former residence of the Rev. Samuel Marsden during the 1820s and 1830s. It was later the residence of Richard, then Henrietta Rouse and the Hon. Robert Fitzgerald, MLC, from the 1840s. The building is an important example of an early 19th-century homestead in the Colonial Georgian style.

Mamre was listed on the New South Wales State Heritage Register on 2 April 1999 having satisfied the following criteria.

The place is important in demonstrating the course, or pattern, of cultural or natural history in New South Wales.

Mamre is of high historical significance for its association with both the Rev. Samuel Marsden and the Rouse Family. It has further significance for the production and export of the first "weavable" wool in the colony and for its association with the settlement and development of pastoral/farming activities in the St Marys district.

The place is important in demonstrating aesthetic characteristics and/or a high degree of creative or technical achievement in New South Wales.

Mamre is of high aesthetic significance as a fine example of an early Colonial Georgian Residence retaining some elements of its original rural setting.

The place has a strong or special association with a particular community or cultural group in New South Wales for social, cultural or spiritual reasons.

Mamre is of high social significance for its association with prominent colonial figures and for its association with early employment in the district through the pastoral activities which took place there.

The place has potential to yield information that will contribute to an understanding of the cultural or natural history of New South Wales.

Mamre is of high technical/research significance for its demonstration of early 19th-century building techniques and farming practices.

The place possesses uncommon, rare or endangered aspects of the cultural or natural history of New South Wales.

Relatively rare.

The place is important in demonstrating the principal characteristics of a class of cultural or natural places/environments in New South Wales.

Mamre is representative of major colonial homesteads with substantial acreage.

== See also ==
- Australian residential architectural styles
- History of New South Wales
- List of heritage houses in Sydney
