= A9 (Sydney) =

Road in New South Wales, Australia

A9 (numerous constituent roads) New South Wales

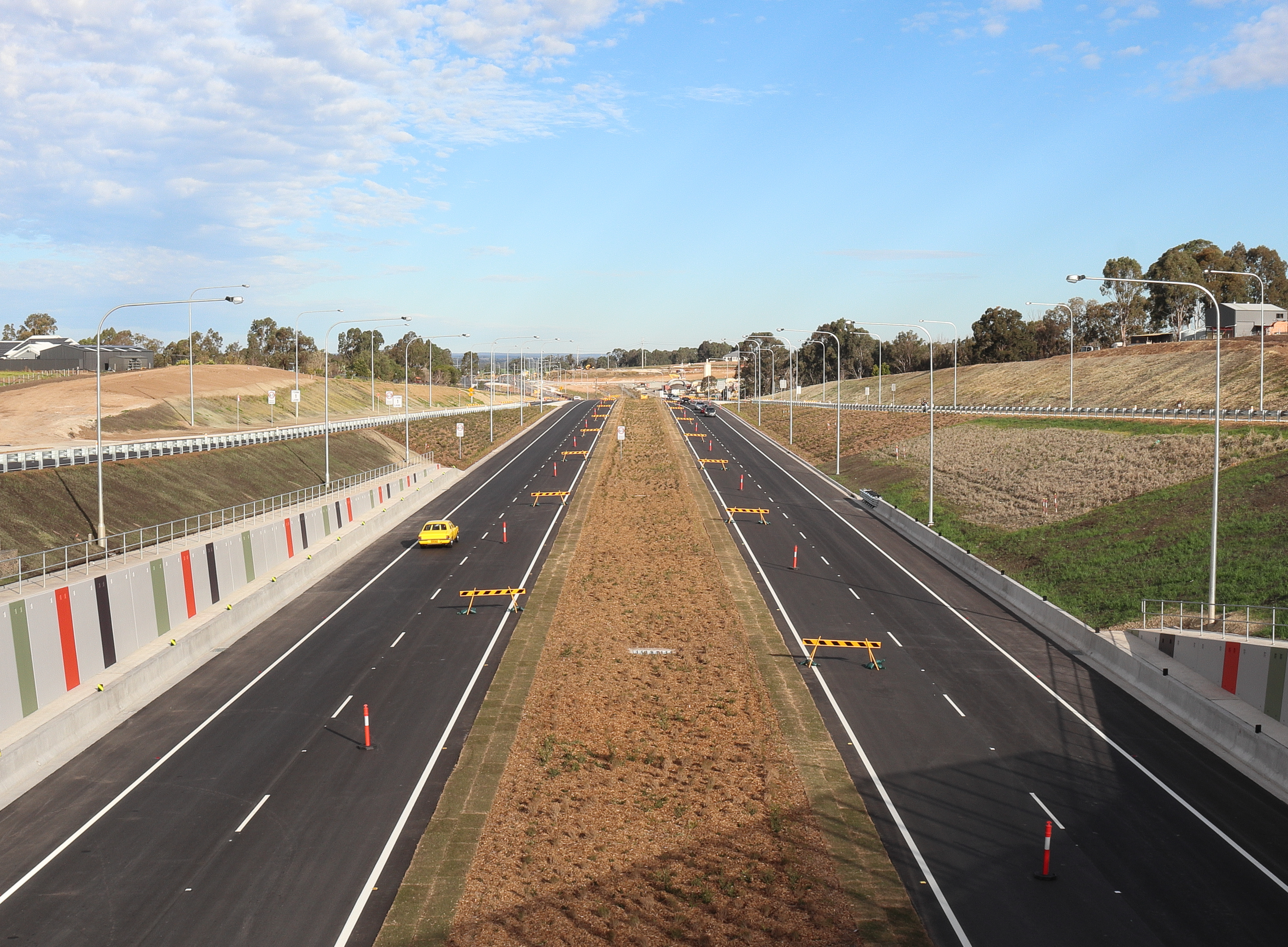
- The Northern Road looking south at Bringelly Road interchange
- Location in metropolitan Sydney
- Coordinates: 33.605359°S 150.824252°E (North end); 34.061954°S 150.785282°E (South end)

General information
- Type: Road
- Length: 62.6 km (39 mi)
- Gazetted: August 1928
- Route number(s): A9 (2013–present)
- Former route number: Metroad 9 (1998–2013); State Route 69 (1973–1998)

Major junctions
- North end: Bridge Street; Windsor, Sydney
- Great Western Highway; M4 Motorway; M12 Motorway; Hume Motorway
- South end: Narellan Road; Campbelltown, Sydney

Location(s)
- Major suburbs: Kingswood, Luddenham, Bringelly, Narellan

Highway system
- Highways in Australia; National Highway • Freeways in Australia; Highways in New South Wales

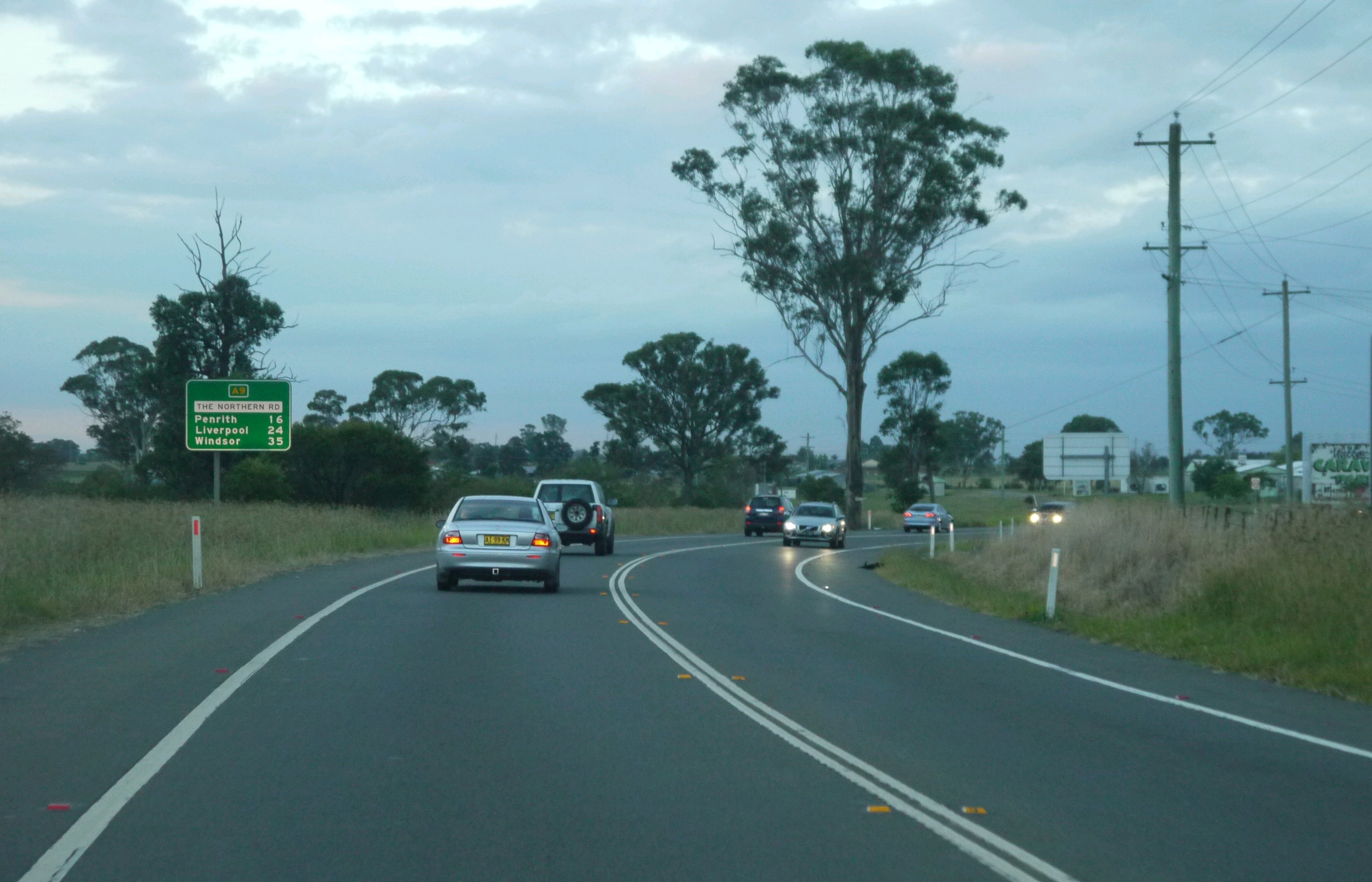
The Northern Road (northbound) at Luddenham

The A9 is a route designation of the outer western Sydney Bypass, connecting Windsor to Campbelltown via Penrith. This name covers a few consecutive roads and is widely known to most drivers, but the entire allocation is also known – and signposted – by the names of its constituent parts: Macquarie Street, George Street, The Northern Road, Richmond Road, Parker Street and Narellan Road.

== Route ==
The A9 commences at the intersection of Macquarie Street and Bridge Street in Windsor and heads in a southwesterly direction as Macquarie Street as a four-lane, single carriageway road, narrowing to two lanes through South Windsor, and then intersects with and changes name to George Street shortly afterwards, eventually meeting Blacktown Road at a roundabout at Londonderry. It runs briefly southeast along Blacktown Road, before following The Northern Road at another roundabout, heading again in a southwesterly direction, before heading south at Llandilo. It changes name to Richmond Road and widens to a four-lane, dual carriageway road at Cranebrook and continues south, changing name again to Parker Street in Penrith, before meeting Great Western Highway a short distance later and widening to a six-lane, dual-carriageway road. Parker Street continues south, changing name back to The Northern Road in South Penrith, crosses M4 Motorway, narrows back to a four-lane, dual-carriageway road, and continues in a southerly direction through Bringelly to eventually meet Camden Valley Way at Narellan. It changes name one final time to Narellan Road and heads southeast, before eventually terminating at the interchange with Hume Motorway on the northern fringes of Campbelltown.

The A9 is also the major link between the International Regatta Centre at Cranebrook and M4 Motorway. It was upgraded just before the 2000 Summer Olympics.

== History ==
The passing of the Main Roads Act of 1924 through the Parliament of New South Wales provided for the declaration of Main Roads, roads partially funded by the State government through the Main Roads Board. Main Road No. 154 was declared from the intersection with Hume Highway (today Camden Valley Way) in Narellan, via Bringelly and Luddenham to Llandilo (and continuing northwards to the intersection with Windsor Street in Richmond), Main Road No. 178 was declared between Narellan and Campbelltown, and Main Road No. 184 was declared along Macquarie Street, between Richmond and Windsor Roads, through Windsor, on the same day, 8 August 1928; with the passing of the Main Roads (Amendment) Act of 1929 to provide for additional declarations of State Highways and Trunk Roads, this was amended to Main Roads 154 and 178 and 184 on 8 April 1929. The northern end of Main Road 154 between Llandilo and Richmond was later re-aligned to run from Llandilo to Windsor on 8 December 1937.

Main Road 154, previously named Bringelly Road, was later renamed The Northern Road (between Blacktown Road in South Windsor and the intersection with Andrews and Richmond Roads in Penrith, and the intersection of Maxwell and Parker Streets in South Penrith to the intersection of Hume Highway – today Camden Valley Way – and Narellan Road in Narellan) on 14 January 1981.

The passing of the Roads Act of 1993 updated road classifications and the way they could be declared within New South Wales. Under this act, the A9 retains its declaration as Main Roads 154 (as Macquarie and George Streets and The Northern Road) and 178 (as Narellan Road), and part of Main Road 184 (Macquarie Street through Windsor).

The route was allocated part of State Route 69 in 1973, linking Singleton to Wollongong via Sydney's western suburbs, along Putty Road, the current A9 route, and Appin Road. It was replaced by Metroad 9 between Windsor and Campbelltown in December 1998, with State Route 69 consequently split into two sections: a northern section along Putty Road connecting Windsor to Singleton, and a southern section along Appin Road connecting Campbelltown to Wollongong via Princes Motorway.

With the conversion to the newer alphanumeric system in 2013, Metroad 9 was replaced by route A9, and the southern section of State Route 69 (Appin Road) was replaced by route B69; the northern section of State Route 69 (Putty Road) was left unallocated.

=== Road upgrade ===
As part of the Western Sydney Infrastructure Plan, 35 km (21.7 mi) of The Northern Road will be upgraded to a minimum of four lanes between The Old Northern Road at Narellan and Jamison Road at South Penrith. The project is being delivered in six stages, with the first stage at Oran Park completed in April 2018. In April 2020, The Northern Road was also realigned between Mersey Road and Eaton Road at Luddenham, to facilitate the construction of Western Sydney Airport. On 16 July 2020, The Northern Road and Bringelly Road interchange opened including a realignment of The Northern Road. On 13 December 2020, The Northern Road was realigned between Elizabeth Drive and Eaton Road was opened to traffic, bypassing Luddenham. The rest of The Northern Road upgrade was completed through 2021, with the final upgrade opened to traffic in December 2021.

=== Future replacement ===
As part of economic development of western Sydney, including the construction of the Western Sydney Airport at Badgerys Creek, the road was proposed to be upgraded to a grade separated motorway. The proposal, known as the M9 Outer-Western Sydney Orbital motorway, would link the M31 near Appin with the Central Coast via Camden, Penrith and Windsor.

As part of the State Budget 2014–15, the NSW Government announced a $5.5 billion road package for Western Sydney. It includes $4.6 million for planning the M9 Motorway. The preferred corridor for the motorway was expected to be announced later in 2014 before plans are made for reserving land. The corridor is now known as Outer Sydney Orbital with motorway codenames as either M9 or M10.

== Exits and interchanges ==
LGA	Location	km	mi	Destinations	Notes
Hawkesbury	Windsor	0.0	0.0	Windsor Road (A2 south, unallocated north) – Putty, Colo, Parramatta	Northern terminus of route A9; Northern end of Macquarie Street
Hawkesbury	Windsor	1.1	0.68	Hawkesbury Valley Way (B59) – Lithgow, Richmond, Vineyard	
Hawkesbury	Windsor	1.5	0.93	Richmond railway line	
Hawkesbury	Windsor	3.2	2.0	George Street – South Windsor	Northbound entrance and exit only Southern end of Macquarie Street
Hawkesbury–Penrith boundary	South Windsor–Londonderry boundary	5.4	3.4	Blacktown Road (north) – Richmond	Southern end of George Street at roundabout
Hawkesbury–Penrith boundary	South Windsor–Londonderry–Bligh Park–Berkshire Park quadripoint	5.6	3.5	Richmond Road (south) – Blacktown, Seven Hills	Southern end of Blacktown Road; Northern end of The Northern Road (northern section)
Penrith	Londonderry–Llandilo–Cranebrook tripoint	13.2	8.2	Londonderry Road (north) – Londonderry; Cranebrook Road (west) – Cranebrook	Roundabout
Penrith	Cranebrook–Penrith–Cambridge Park tripoint	18.7	11.6	Andrews Road – Cranebrook, Penrith	Southern end of The Northern Road (northern section); Northern end of Richmond Road
Penrith	Penrith–Cambridge Park–Kingswood tripoint	20.1	12.5	Coreen Avenue (west) – Penrith; Oxford Street (east) – Cambridge Park	Southern end of Richmond Road; Northern end of Parker Street
Penrith	Penrith–Kingswood boundary	21.1	13.1	Main Western railway line	
Penrith	Penrith–Kingswood boundary	21.2	13.2	Great Western Highway (A44) – Emu Plains, St Marys, Parramatta	
Penrith	South Penrith–Kingswood–Orchard Hills tripoint	23.3	14.5	Maxwell Street (west) – South Penrith; Bringelly Road (east) – Kingswood	Southern end of Parker Street; Northern end of The Northern Road (southern section)
Penrith	Glenmore Park–South Penrith–Orchard Hills tripoint	24.7	15.3	M4 Western Motorway (M4) – Lapstone, Parramatta, Strathfield	
Penrith	Luddenham	33.5	20.8	M12 Motorway — Western Sydney Airport	
Penrith–Liverpool boundary	Luddenham	34.5	21.4	Wilmington Road (west) – Luddenham; Elizabeth Drive (east) – Badgerys Creek, Liverpool	
Liverpool–Camden boundary	Bringelly	45.5	28.3	Bringelly Road – Bringelly, Leppington	
Camden	Narellan–Harrington Park boundary	57.6	35.8	Camden Valley Way – Camden, Leppington	Southern end of The Northern Road (southern section); Northern end of Narellan Road
Camden	Narellan–Narellan Vale–Smeaton Grange tripoint	58.2	36.2	Camden Bypass – Camden	
Campbelltown	Mount Annan–Blairmount–Campbelltown tripoint	62.6	38.9	Hume Motorway (M31) – Prestons, Goulburn, Canberra	
Campbelltown	Mount Annan–Blairmount–Campbelltown tripoint	62.6	38.9	Narellan Road (B69 south) – Campbelltown, Appin, Bulli	Southwestern terminus route A9; Narellan Road continues south as route B69
Incomplete access; Route transition
