= Werrington =

Werrington may refer to any of the following places.

== United Kingdom ==
- Werrington, Cornwall, England
- Werrington, Peterborough in Cambridgeshire, England
  - Werrington Dive Under, railway junction near Werrington.
- Werrington, Staffordshire, England

== Australia ==
- Werrington, New South Wales
- Werrington Downs, New South Wales
- Werrington County, New South Wales
