= Jordan Springs, New South Wales =

Jordan Springs
- Suburb
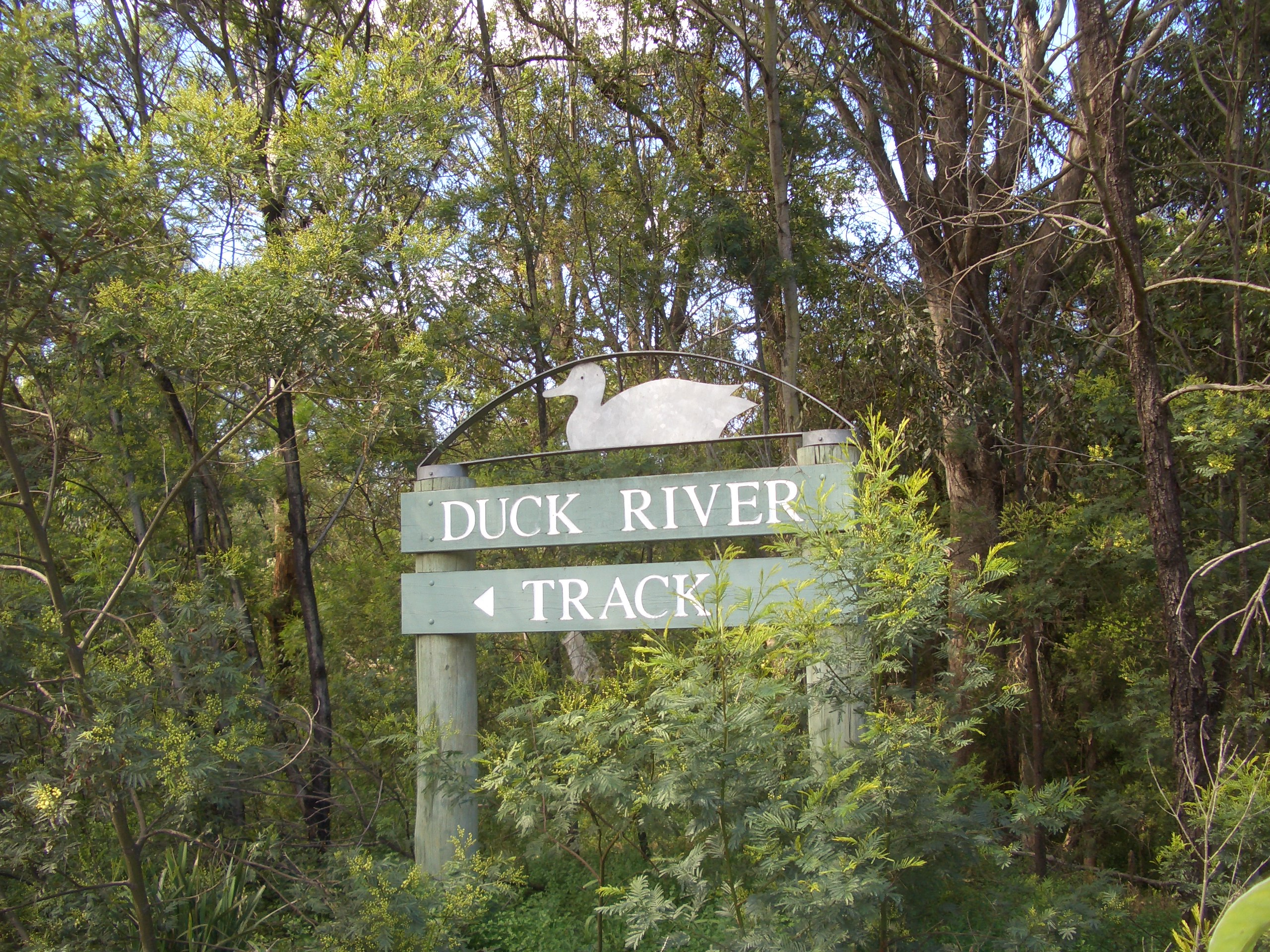

- Interactive map of Jordan Springs
- Coordinates: 33°43′26″S 150°43′41″E
- Country: Australia
- State: New South Wales
- City: Sydney
- LGA: City of Penrith
- Location: 53 km (33 mi) west of Sydney CBD

Government
  - State electorate: Londonderry
  - Federal division: Lindsay
- Elevation: 39 m (128 ft)

Population
  - Total: 11,772 (2021 census)
- Postcode: 2747
- Gazetted: 2011
Suburbs around Jordan Springs
Londonderry	Llandilo	Shanes Park
Cranebrook	Jordan Springs	Ropes Crossing
North Penrith	Cambridge Gardens; Werrington Downs; Werrington County	St Marys

Jordan Springs is a suburb of Sydney, in the state of New South Wales, Australia. It is 53 kilometres (33 mi) west of the Sydney central business district, in the local government area of the City of Penrith. It was registered with the Geographical Names Board of New South Wales in 2011.

On 22 November 2019, the suburb was expanded eastwards up to South Creek, incorporating the Central Precinct of the St Marys Release Area, which was previously part of the suburb of Llandilo. As of the 2021 Australian census, Jordan Springs has a population of 11,772.
