= Richmond Road, Sydney =

Road in Sydney, Australia

Richmond Road Blacktown Road New South Wales
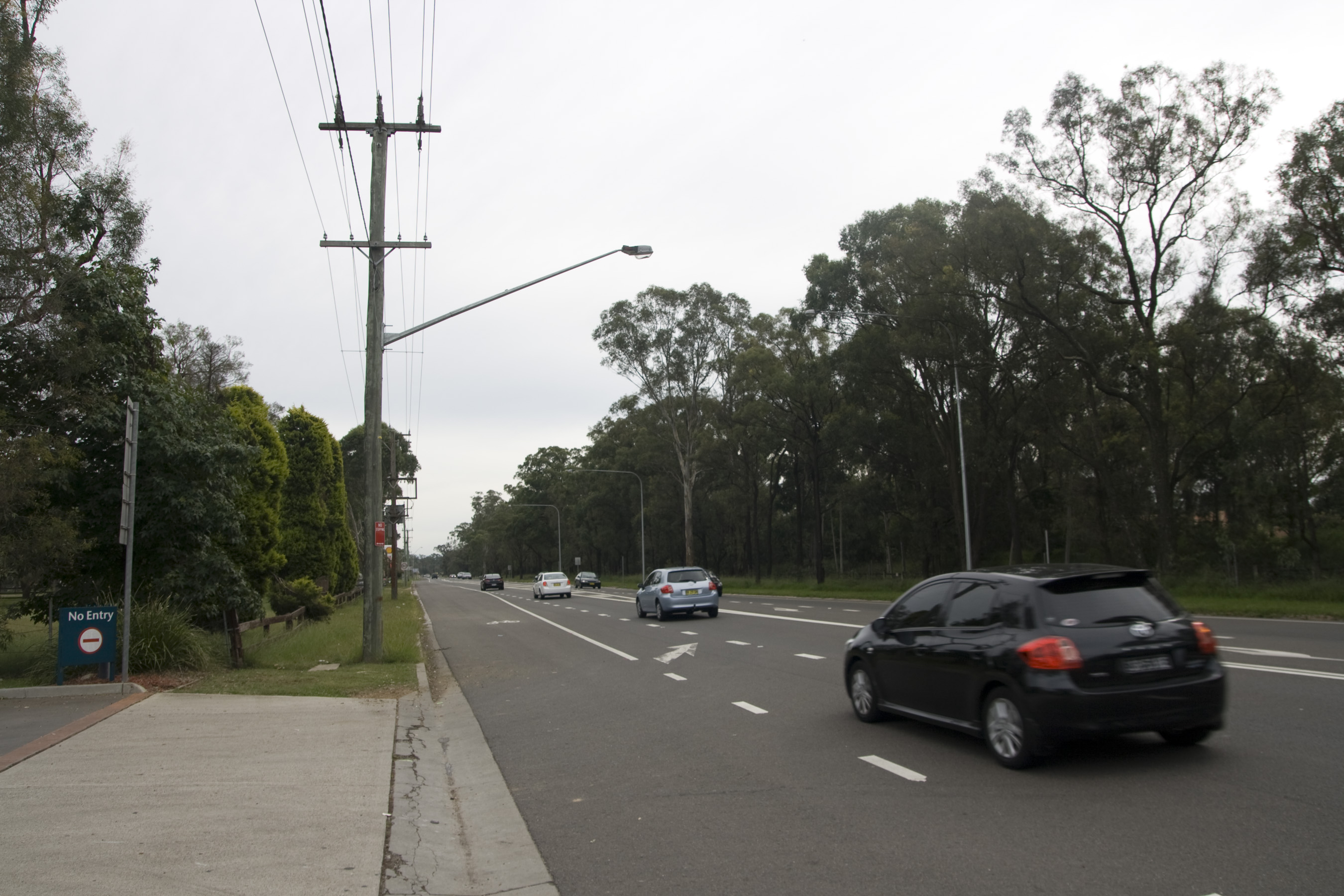
- Richmond Road in Berkshire Park
- Coordinates: 33.603824°S 150.757297°E (Northwest end); 33.766741°S 150.905205°E (Southeast end)

General information
- Type: Road
- Length: 23.7 km (15 mi)
- Gazetted: May 1948
- Former route number: State Route 61 (1974–2005)

Major junctions
- Northwest end: Lennox Street; Richmond, Sydney
- George Street; The Northern Road; Westlink M7
- Southeast end: Patrick Street; Blacktown, Sydney

Location(s)
- Major suburbs: Londonderry, Marsden Park, Dean Park, Woodcroft

Richmond Road (and at its northwestern end as Blacktown Road) is a 23.5-kilometre (15 mi) arterial road linking Richmond and Blacktown through the northwestern suburbs of Sydney, Australia.

== Route ==
Blacktown Road commences at the intersection of Lennox and Bourke Streets in Richmond and heads in a southeasterly direction as a two-lane, single carriageway road, meeting George Street at Londonderry, where it changes name to Richmond Road and continues to meet The Northern Road a short distance later, then continuing southeast before widening to a four-lane, dual-carriageway road through Marsden Park until it reaches the interchange with Westlink M7 at Dean Park. It continues southeasterly through Woodcroft until it reaches the outskirts of Blacktown, crossing the Main Western railway line as a bus-only road, before terminating at the intersection with Kildare Road and Patrick and Main Streets in Blacktown.

== History ==
The passing of the Main Roads Act of 1924 through the Parliament of New South Wales provided for the declaration of Main Roads, roads partially funded by the State government through the Main Roads Board (later Transport for NSW). With the subsequent passing of the Main Roads (Amendment) Act of 1929 to provide for additional declarations of State Highways and Trunk Roads, the Department of Main Roads (having succeeded the MRB in 1932) declared Main Road 537 along Richmond Road, from the intersection with Garfield Road in Marsden Park to the intersection with Rooty Hill Road (and continuing north along Garfield Road to the intersection with Windsor Road in Box Hill, and continuing south along Rooty Hill Road to the intersection with Great Western Highway in Wallgrove), on 19 May 1948; its northwestern end was re-aligned to run all the way along Richmond and Blacktown Roads to Richmond (with the former alignment along Garfield Road replaced by Main Road 546) on 15 February 1950.

The passing of the Roads Act of 1993 updated road classifications and the way they could be declared within New South Wales. Under this act, Richmond and Blacktown Roads retain their declaration as part of Main Road 537.

The route was allocated part of State Route 61 in 1974. When Westlink M7 opened in 2005 (subsuming Philip Parkway, part of State Route 61), the allocation was removed in its entirety.

== Major intersections ==
LGA	Location	km	mi	Destinations	Notes
Hawkesbury	Richmond	0.0	0.0	Lennox Street (west) – Richmond	Northwestern terminus of road
Hawkesbury	Richmond	0.0	0.0	Bourke Street – Richmond, RAAF Base Richmond, Western Sydney University	
Hawkesbury–Penrith boundary	Londonderry–South Windsor boundary	4.7	2.9	George Street (A9 north) – Windsor	Concurrency with route A9 between roundabouts
Hawkesbury–Penrith boundary	Londonderry–South Windsor boundary	5.0	3.1	The Northern Road (A9 south) – Penrith, Narellan	Concurrency with route A9 between roundabouts
Blacktown	Marsden Park–Angus boundary	12.5	7.8	Garfield Road West (east) – Riverstone; Abell Road (west) – Melonba	
Blacktown	Marsden Park	13.8	8.6	South Street – Schofields, Rouse Hill	
Blacktown	Colebee–Oakhurst–Dean Park–Glendenning quadripoint	17.0	10.6	Rooty Hill Road North – Plumpton, Rooty Hill	
Blacktown	Colebee–Oakhurst–Dean Park–Glendenning quadripoint	17.0	10.6	Westlink M7 (M7) – Prestons, Eastern Creek, Baulkham Hills	Northbound exit via Rooty Hill Road North
Blacktown	Blacktown	23.4	14.5	Third Avenue (north) – Blacktown; Balmoral Street (south) – Prospect	Bus-only traffic southeast of intersection
Blacktown	Blacktown	23.6	14.7	Main Western railway line	
Blacktown	Blacktown	23.7	14.7	Main Street (east) – Prospect, Blacktown Hospital; Kildare Road (west) – Doonside	Bus-only traffic northwest and southeast of intersection
Blacktown	Blacktown	23.7	14.7	Patrick Street (south) – Blacktown	Southeastern terminus of road
Concurrency terminus; Tolled; Route transition
