= Clydesdale, Marsden Park =

Clydesdale
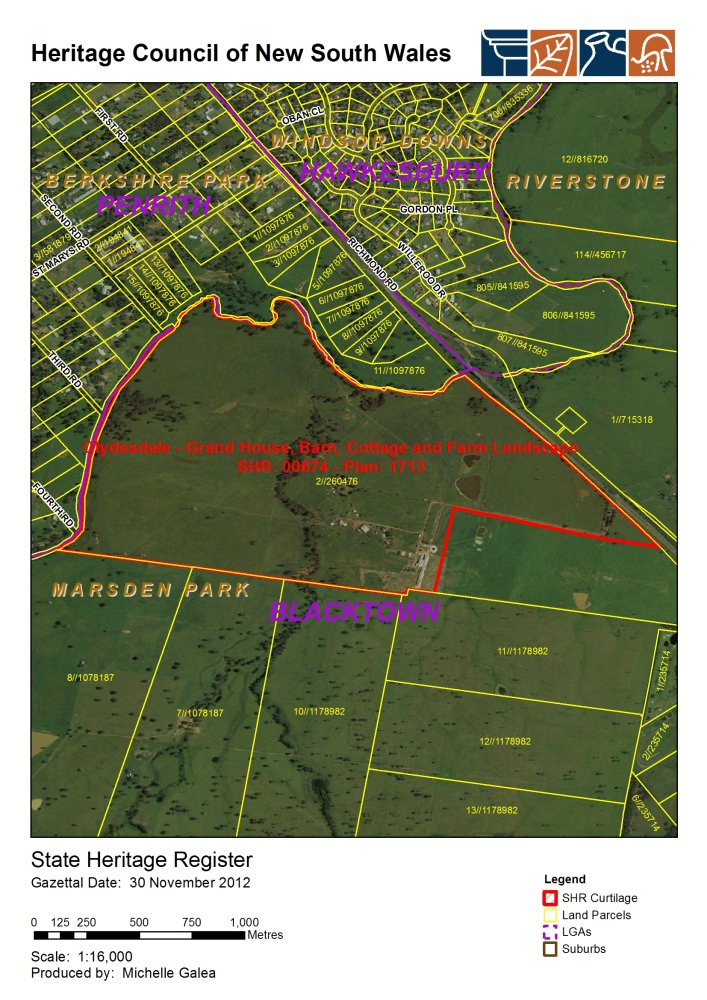
- Heritage boundaries

- Location within Sydney
- 33°40′58″S 150°48′27″E
- Location: 1270 Richmond Road, Marsden Park, City of Blacktown, New South Wales, Australia

History
- Built: 1823–1885

Site notes
- Owner: Francis George Pace

New South Wales Heritage Register
- Official name: Clydesdale - House, Barn, Cottage and Farm Landscape; Lang's Farm; Echovale (northern half)
- Type: State heritage (complex / group)
- Designated: 2 April 1999
- Reference no.: 674
- Type: Homestead Complex
- Category: Farming and Grazing

Clydesdale is a heritage-listed homestead and former seminary and missionary school (1859–71) and wartime hospital (1942–44) at 1270 Richmond Road, Marsden Park, New South Wales, an outer suburb of Sydney, Australia. It was built from 1823 to 1885. It is also known as Lang's Farm; the northern half is also known as Echovale. It was added to the New South Wales State Heritage Register on 2 April 1999.

== History ==
The area was traditionally occupied by the Darug people prior to the arrival of Europeans. The Warrawarry clan in were recorded around the Eastern Creek district and are likely to have occupied the Marsden Park area. Prior to European settlement the area was thickly forested with creeks and waterways intersecting the area.

Roads through the area were developed by the 1790s and between 1792 and 1860 clearing for agricultural purposes transformed the woodland landscape of the Blacktown area. The soils of the area did not support grain crops but they were found to be successful for supporting fruit trees and vineyards, and the area became well known for its orchards. Prior to 1816 Richmond Road was mainly an unformed track linking Richmond to Prospect, Parramatta and Sydney. The road was improved in 1816 and again in 1822.

Clydesdale is situated on 700 acres of land granted to Walter Lang, businessman and India trader, in the Parish of Rooty Hill in September 1813. Initially it was known as Lang's Farm. Lang leased the land to William Walker for 91 years on his return to London in 1814. Lang died in 1815 and the land was sold to Charles Tompson in 1819. Although only working as a clerk in Sydney, he appears to have been engaged in trading, having worked as a merchant prior to his transportation to Australia for stealing two books. He also appeared to have the respect of prominent free settlers such as Reverend Thomas Hassall, Captain John Piper and Governor Macquarie

Tompson arrived in the colony in 1804 as a convict on board the Coromandel. He enlarged the estate to 865 acres by purchasing two adjacent farms. By 1822 Tompson had built a "good dwelling house safe from inundation" which he was offering for lease together with 25-50 acres. In 1825 a commodious two-storey brick dwelling with large barn, shed, stables, outhouse, dwelling for servants and stockyards with garden and orchard was described as being on the site. 1827 there was a Georgian style brick, two-storey dwelling built upon an 1822 homestead. Tompson resided there with his wife and nine children. The ground floor of the homestead orientated north-west toward a tributary of South Creek which ran through the property, has been attributed to this 1820 period.

Charles Tompson jnr, who had attended the Rev. Fulton's school at Castlereagh prior to his father's purchase of Clydesdale, dedicated "Wild Notes, from the Lyre of a Native Minstrel", the first published book of Australian poetry at Clydesdale on 1 March 1826.

When the 1828 census was taken, Clydesdale was a thriving community. Personnel employed by Tompson and residing on the property included an overseer, teacher, cook, shoemaker, stableman, two shepherds, two labourers, a hut keeper, herdsmen, ploughman, carpenter and a house servant. George Bennett, medical practitioner and naturalist, later well known for his involvement with the Australian Museum, stayed at Clydesdale in 1832. He observed that the cultivated land on local farms was generally located near the houses. Around Clydesdale were patches of "fine red clay soil, which has been found very productive when laid out as vineyards."

Records of the Royal Botanic Garden, Sydney show that Tompson was sent ornamental shrubs in 1835. In the 1840s Tompson donated land for a church to be built on the property. The construction on St Phillip's Church of England began in 1845 and was consecrated on 21 September 1846. The church was erected on ground on the eastern side of the bank of South Creek on an area which flooded from time to time.

The 1840s was also a period of financial trouble for Tompson which saw him lose Clydesdale in 1850. A lease advertisement in 1848 describes Clydesdale as an almost complete estate, including church and a two-storey brick house with 9 foot verandah on most sides. The house included six ground floor rooms, a kitchen, laundry, washhouse and two sleeping rooms for servants. The upper floor contained eleven bedrooms. The brick outbuildings consisted of a six stall stable and coach house with extensive lofts over the top, bakehouse and rooms for the residence of several labouring families. Slab outbuildings included two stores, an office, granary over the stores, garden hut and other huts, barn and very extensive sheds for carts etc. All buildings were shingled. The estate, totalling about 900 acres, was fenced in and divided into securely enclosed paddocks. Approximately 500 acres was cleared and fit for cultivation. Three acres of gardens were well stocked with fruit trees.

Clydesdale was purchased by Edward and John Lamb in 1851 and by 1853 the Plunkett family and R. Fawcett (who built a racecourse before 1853) had occupied the site. In 1859 the Marist Fathers purchased Clydesdale to replace their Hunters Hill property Villa Maria as a Marist seminary. The Marist Fathers trained South Sea Island students at the site until c. 1870. The first six boys arrived towards the end of 1861. The students came mainly from Wallis and Futuna, Samoa and Tonga. During the period of Marist ownership, the Hawkesbury River flooded 16 times, continuing to affect the property and strain resources. The Great Flood of 1867 caused the most damage to the church and crops and came within two metres of the Clydesdale Homestead. The Marists had sold Clydesdale to the Hassall family by 1870. The Hassalls also owned the adjoining property.

During the 1870s the house was occupied by James and Andrew Broad, followed by William Kempton Smith. By 1880 the property was undergoing vast improvements following its purchase as a country residence by John Hardie, Mayor of Sydney and lawyer. On 18 October 1884, 250 acres of the 1,000 acre property was depicted in Town and Country Journal as being "under cultivation and the whole area divided into almost two equal portions by the main road. The church was still located on the property during this period, but constant flooding saw the church closed in 1887 and allowed to fall into ruin. Hardie was using the farm principally as a stock farm containing about 40 drought and blood horses. The house was approached by a long drive which the writer considered would eventually form a "handsome avenue" and included a broad verandah with ample lunges for relaxing. The interior was comfortable and useful rather than ornamental. It included dining, drawing and other rooms as well as a cool dairy.

By 1903 Clydesdale was owned by George Grierson Kiss who was also breeding horses and sent 125 to Java. Kiss was a well known bloodstock dealer with a stand at Randwick and a horse bazaar in Sydney.

Kiss sold the property to J. A. Buckland in 1919, grazier. A 1919 sale advertisement noted: "large and choice orchard, extensive and artistic shrubberies, a tennis court, lawns and gardens".

Buckland moved to Clydesdale with his family and remained until his unexpected death in 1932.

The property was subsequently sold to George Pottie and Bruce Pottie - a veterinary surgeon, who onsold it to Joseph Earnest James in the mid 1930s. This coincided with the subdivision of Clydesdale in 1933, creating Echovale on the northern side of Richmond Road. The remaining 548 acres continued as Clydesdale.

By late 1935, Joseph James, a stock and station agent from Windsor had purchased the Clydesdale property which he ran as a dairy farm until the Royal Australian Air Force took over the estate in 1942. Forty patients were admitted and the property operated as a mixed farm.

During the Second World War years, the house was partitioned as patients and doctors quarters. It was used until 1944 Clydesdale was used as a horse stud for many years. A 1942 topographical map of the area shows a well-defined trotting track with access roads to the north-east of the homestead.

After the war, the property was returned to the James family who sold in mid 1945 to Miss Evelyn Williams of Elizabeth Bay. The property remained in her possession until her death.

Associated Dairies Pty Ltd purchased the property in 1963 and was used for dairy herds and growing feed crops. A new, traditional dairy with 16 stalls in a straight line was installed at Clydesdale in 1973. Gradually less feed was grown and beef cattle were fattened on those parts of the property not used for the dairy cows. In 1987 a Rotalactor Dairy was installed.

In 2001 Clydesdale was sold and continued to be used for cattle grazing and a free range egg farm.

=== Garden ===
Sketches of the house and garden in the above journal show and note many ornamental garden walks, one of them almost encircling the house. The principal walk, axial to the front door, was edged with garden bed edging tiles. Fine umbrageous trees were noted to shade this and other walks. Another sketch showed a scene at the back of the homestead, the stables and outbuildings and noted cattle grazing in the paddocks.

An aerial photograph from 1947 indicates that some of the avenue planting on the approach had survived.

=== Comparative information ===
The Clydesdale House is one example of few remaining early colonial houses in Sydney's west. These places form a rough arc commencing at Bella Vista at Kellyville, past Rouse Hill House (c. 1818) at Rouse Hill, Tebbutt's farm, Hobartville and St. Mathew's Rectory (c.1825) at Windsor, Rutherglen (c.1830) at Richmond, and Mamre (c.1828) at St. Mary's. Hadley Park (c.1830) in Castlereagh, now demolished, would also have complemented this list. They each share a common architecture of Georgian style, with two storeys built close to the ground and with a hip roof. However, whilst the more popular form of the Georgian house has four windows and a door at ground level, and five windows above placed symmetrically, Clydesdale had only two windows and a door on ground level, with three windows above. A central lower hall extending through the building is also characteristic of the style together with a grand staircase to the upper level. Initial roof cladding would have been shingle, later replaced by slate, iron or tiles.

== Description ==
=== Farm ===
==== Entry gates ====
The current entry to the Estate is formalised through the provision of a large gates bounded on each side with decorative sandstone pillars and walls. The gates are simple steel tube structures that are out-of-character to the sandstone abutments that support them. The pillar on the western side has provision for a mailbox built into the stonework. A steel structure supports a sign on each side of the gate with the title Associated Dairies - 1270 Richmond Rd - Phone 627 3883

==== Driveway ====
For most of its length the original straight driveway is outlined by two landscape features. The first is a substantial fence line on each side of the road, and the second the remnants of an avenue of trees set inside the fence line but on the edge of the access road itself. It is part of a realignment which took place between the late 1970s and the early 1980s when the alignment of Richmond Road was changed at the South Creek bridge. The road was lowered into a cutting in the vicinity of the original entry, and raised to access the new bridge. These structural changes necessitated closure of the original entry and a new entry off Richmond Road about halfway between the bridge and the original entry.

==== Garden ====
The garden appears to have been laid out roughly symmetrically on three sides of the house, with a semi-circular pathway or drive to its front. The original roughly symmetrical planting of many of the remaining mature trees in the garden (in 2000) is discernible in this photograph. Plantings included black locusts/false acacias (Robinia pseudoacacia); white cedars (Melia azederach var.australasica); privet (Ligustrum sp.); African olive (Olea europaea var.Africana); peppercorns (Schinus molle); two bunya-bunya pines (Araucaria bidwillii); an old kurrajong (Brachychiton populneum); and old fruit trees; fan palms (Washingtonia robusta) (likely planted at the turn of the 20th century); and cotton palms (W.filifera); plumbago (Plumbago capensis); mulberry (Morus rubra); Indian shot (Canna indica cv.s); jacaranda (Jacaranda mimosifolia); Malaviscus sp.; oleanders (Nerium oleander); roses and crepe myrtles (Lagerstroemia indica).

==== Homestead complex ====
The external appearance of the house has been altered by the twentieth-century additions of an upper-floor verandah on three sides, and modifications around the rear.

The existing building is most likely a combination of two early Georgian structures. However, significant renovations have been carried out periodically over the history of the house. Both structures are solid hand made brick on brick footings and have a common wall on both levels. However, significant renovations have been carried out periodically over the history of the house. Both structures are solid hand made brick on brick footings and have a common wall on both levels.

The smaller of the structures is a two-storey, externally rendered brick structure on the southern end of the main structure. It has a typical Georgian symmetry and it faces south easterly. The external doors are moulded panel doors (one hung upside down). Windows are twelve panel double hung sash colonial style with timber louvre shutters and stone sills. A single corbel chimney exists on the southern end with two chimney pots. The original structure was divided with four rooms on the lower level and two rooms on the upper level. Current flooring is concrete on the lower level with no skirting, and timber above. The timber flooring is tongue and groove hardwood in two sizes with skirting in some rooms. There is no internal wall render, and a small plain staircase with winder between levels. A lath and plaster wall divides the staircase from the upper room. Later renovation has provided a bathroom on the upper level. Ceilings in this section of the building are a mixture of timber boards, lath and plaster, and fibro cement. The presence of lath and plaster in the vertical wall and the ceiling (now missing) suggest this portion of the structure originally had lath and plaster ceilings. The roof is of slate with modern metal ridge capping.

The main structure is a two-storey externally and internally rendered brick structure with a Georgian symmetry. A timber-framed verandah extends around three sides over each of the two levels of the structure although the upper western portion has been removed for safety reasons. The lower verandah is paved in cut sandstone, whilst the upper floor is tongue and grooved timber. The verandahs are of Edwardian style, however the balustrades and valance are Colonial (chinoiserie) in style.

External doors on the lower level vary in style. They are timber-framed. The front door is a six panel door with glass side lights and a glass fan light. External doors on the upper level include three glass-paned french doors, and two moulded panel doors. The upper front door is timber framed with three glass lights and two timber panels. It is surrounded by two side lights and three fan lights. The glass used is leadlighted. Most internal doorways in the main section of the building have a panelled Colonial doorcase. The doors themselves are six-panel timber-framed doors.

Windows are double-hung but vary in style throughout the building. The number of panes in each sash varies from six to one. Each has louvred timber framed shutters and stone sills. Architraves and skirtings in the front four rooms are 1920s style. Fireplaces (4) have varied styles. The fireplace in the room is significantly different from the three others in that it is typically art-deco style. Other fireplace surrounds tend to be colonial style. Surface finishes in all rooms is paint.

Flooring is tongue and groove timber boards in all spaces excepting the kitchen and entry porch which are concrete. The upper room to the south west is raised above the level of other floors. The size of the timber boards varies from 80 to 150 mm in six size ranges, suggesting that the flooring in various spaces has been replaced at various times, with larger board sizes being common to earlier periods. Skirting boards in the main rooms of the main structure vary from 230 – 260 mm and are most likely Australian Red Cedar. The main staircase has enclosed risers and nosed treads. The handrail is moulded timber, supported on turned balusters. A small cupboard is constructed under the staircase. Evidence shows that the fascia and cupboard are constructed from Australian Red Cedar. It is likely that the balusters and risers are similar.

Ceilings and cornices in the main structure are a mixture of fibrous cement, plaster, timber, pressed metal and gyprock. These suggest several different phases of renovation. The existing roof is a hip roof with a box gutter, clad in slate with modern coated steel ridge capping. Evidence of an earlier terracotta ridge capping (c. 1910s) exists inside the roof space and on the upper verandah. Roof timbers (rafters, and collar ties) are circular sawn. However the ceiling joists in the main structure are a mixture of hand and machine cut timbers. Three chimneys penetrate the roof line, each with a double corbel and one, or two, English vernacular revival (c.1915) chimney pots. There is clear evidence in the roof space that approximately 600 mm height has been added to the upper storey and that the roof structure has been completely replaced over the main section. The chimney has also been raised, and lead flashing indicates the original roof line. Ceiling joists in some areas are hand sawn and of irregular size.

==== Wash Room ====
The washroom is a light timber framed structure clad in fibro internally and externally. The framing timbers are in poor condition, but appear to have been hand sawn. There is a single door in one end and a small casement window along each side. The door is timber panelled with a decorative architrave around the doorframe on the outside. The roof is a hip roof with gables at each end. Ventilation exists in the peak of the gable on each end. The roof is clad in unglazed French Marseille terracotta tiles. The room is fitted out with taps which were once over basins or tubs. The modern use of this room was that of a laundry, however it is postulated that the original use was for the homestead dairy or meat store.

==== Pump Base ====
The location of the remains of the water pumping system are on the banks of South Creek some 530 m north east of the homestead. The structure no longer exists, but the concrete pump base does. The concrete base is 1830 x 770 standing about 400 above the ground with four mounting bolts embedded in it. Parts of the heavily corroded galvanised steel supply pipe still lie on the ground between the pump site and the homestead.

==== Fence ====
The homestead yard is surrounded by a fence which today is part post and wire, and part post and rail to the south and west. On the east side it is only post and wire. Several sections are broken.

==== Conservatory ====
The conservatory is a relatively small structure located close to the main homestead building on the eastern side. It is constructed of rendered single course brickwork to a height of 990 mm. This is surmounted by a number of fixed pane timber-framed windows coated with a "whitewash". The roof is a hip roof clad with pressed metal "tiles" with glass panelled gables at each end. A single door provides access on the south west end. The floor is concrete in the centre and dirt on the outer edges. Timber shelves provide support for plants on three sides of the structure. The render on the brickwork is the same as that on the main building. Currently, some modern pumping equipment is located in the south east corner.

==== The Stables ====
The stables are a large T-shaped solid brick structure approximately 32m x 19m. The bricks are machine made and laid in a colonial bond with a flush joint on brick footings. It has a pitched roof with gable on the north western end. The roof timbers are all circular sawn hardwood. The roof is clad with corrugated galvanised steel. It has open eaves and a barge board. A fixed skylight provides light into space near the centre of the building. There is a mixture of hopper and double hung windows around the structure, and some windows are fixed pane windows. Window sills are brick-on-edge. There are two large swing doors on the stable end of the structure, two large roller doors on the north west side, and standard hinged doors on the north east and south west sides. There is clear evidence of an extension to the brickwork to the north west, and modification to the window brickwork on the north east side. The internal space can be considered to be divided into three separate areas, a motor garage on the north west side, domestic flats in the middle and stables on the south east side. The stable provides stalls for four horses, however only two seem to be still used for this purpose. The stalls are made from sawn timber. The garage is mainly open space; however, there is a timber bench on the north east wall. The flats have been created by using light timber framing clad in fibro-cement, with appropriate spaces including bathrooms (2), kitchens (2), toilets (2), and living and sleeping areas. An external laundry and toilet exists on the south west side of the building.

==== Burial Ground ====
The burial ground associated with the Marist occupation of the Clydesdale homestead seems to have been originally a small structure roughly 6m x 8m and is located some 250 m to the south of the homestead. Modern steel star pickets and wire strands have replaced the original post and rail fence. Several sandstone headstones remain in place, whilst others have been knocked down. The stones are not in good condition. The remains of a number of dressed stone posts exist. These posts have iron/steel rings set in lead at the top and also about half-height. These posts could have formed the surround to a grave that is now not identifiable.

==== Cottages ====
Cottages 1 to 5 and 7 are not considered to have a high grade of heritage significance. The small cottage (cottage 06) located south east of the homestead is a timber-framed structure clad mainly with weatherboards. Two brick chimneys exist on the eastern side. These are made from hand made bricks very similar in structure and colour to those used in the homestead. External doors are timber framed panel or solid. Windows are a mixture of double hung and casement types. The original structure had four rooms, but this has been extended to include a covered-in verandah on the northern side and another on the southern side.

==== Rotary Dairy ====
The rotary dairy consists of a circular structural steel frame, divided radially and equipped for milking cows. The central circular portion is able to rotate. Cattle races exist to enable cows to be moved onto the rotating portion ready for milking, and on the other side to enable them to exit. An adjacent building has provision for the vacuum equipment for the milking machines, storage and testing facilities.

==== St. Philip's Cemetery ====
This cemetery was associated with St. Philip's Church of England Church which was established on land provided by Charles Tompson. The church has long been demolished. The cemetery is approximately 9 m square and fenced with a post and four rail timber fence. Four headstones and a footstone remain covered by quite thick grass.

==== Potentially Significant Archaeological Deposits ====
St. Phillip's Church and cemetery (AD01) Toll house (AD02) Toll gate (AD03) Water wells (AD04-AD06) Cellar (AD07) Tunnel (AD08) Trotting Track (AD09).

==== Homestead/garden area ====
During fieldwork it was noted that a number of areas within the homestead fence line had grass significantly more green than the remainder of the lawn. Seven roughly circular areas approximately 2 - 2.5 m diameter were identified in three groups. It is anticipated that the extra nourishment indicated by the green growth is caused by possible access to an under ground water source. The shape suggests that if there is such a source then it could be from a pre-existing water well or existing septic tank. Alternatively, they may be the location of an earlier planting hole and the aeration and increased biomass caused by the root-zone have allowed more water penetration and moisture holding, resulting in more lush growth. These sites are therefore identified as potentially significant archaeological deposits which will need to be monitored in the event of later excavation.

=== Condition ===
As at 20 December 2012, the property was reported to be in fair to good condition. One potential Aboriginal archaeological site has been reported on the estate, together with three isolated Aboriginal stone artefacts. The potential Aboriginal archaeological site is described as "an open campsite" and is recorded on the NPWS database.

==== Archaeological potential ====
Potentially significant historical archaeological deposits on Clydesdale estate include:

- St.Phillip's Church (AD01) - On the eastern side of Richmond Road, most likely in the vicinity of the cemetery on the original alignment of the road. French (1988) places it on the eastern banks of South Creek. There are no easily discernable above-ground signs of the church's existence so this site is a potentially significant archaeological site.
- Toll House (AD02) and Toll Gate (AD03) - These were set up on Richmond Road to collect tolls on produce coming in from the west. Their exact location is unknown. Had they been located at Marsden Park severe disturbance of the natural landform when Richmond Road was raised and re-aligned in the early 1980s may have obliterated any evidence. Nonetheless this is an issue for the owner of part Lot 1 DP715318. Further research needs to be carried out to clarify the positions of these items. The general area around the site needs to be considered a potentially significant archaeological site until this work is done. These sites are not under the current owner of Clydesdale's control.
- Water wells (AD04-06)- Whilst Clydesdale has electrical power from the state grid, it is not connected to the city's reticulated water system. It has therefore to rely totally on its own water supply. A number of water tanks of modern style exist in various places on site. The most significant of these are to the east of the homestead (B27), to the south-west (B26) and beside the eastern end of the stables. The remains of a water tank stand, most likely from the period of RAAF occupation exists to the south-east of the homestead adjacent to the tank B26.
- During site fieldwork it was noticed that in several places within the yard of the homestead rather greener round patches of grass appeared following mowing. These appear to be receiving moisture where other areas of lawn are not. The potential is that there are the remains of early water wells beneath these areas. Seven such areas have been identified and grouped into three potential archaeological deposits AD04-AD06. They are plotted on the site plan for the homestead (Appendix H).
- The Cellar (AD07) and Tunnel (AD08) - Reference is made in several places in the historical record to the presence of a cellar and a tunnel. French indicates that "it was said that in the very early days a cellar and tunnel connecting it with one of the cottages on the estate was dug as an escape route from Aboriginal attack. Another story assets that convicts were kept in the cellar.". Another account indicates "he had constructed a tunnel beginning at a trap door in the passage outside the kitchen and leading to the stables". Investigation of the physical fabric, including underfloor visual inspection in the front portion of the house clearly refutes any notion of either a cellar or a tunnel. However the more modern concrete over the flooring in the kitchen and the rear portion of the homestead may well cover such features.
- The Trotting Track (AD09) - The historic record makes clear reference to the use of Clydesdale as a horse stud over many years. The 1942 topographic map for the area shows a well defined trotting track with access roads to the north-east of the homestead, and whilst the track does not exist on the 1947 aerial photograph there is clear evidence of disturbed soil outlining its original location. The potential for archaeological deposits in the vicinity of this track are reasonably high

=== Modifications and dates ===
- 1825-1848 - Tompson extends the 1822-23 terrace with the Georgian style mansion. 2 storey, with single verandah. House orientation is now to the north west.
- 1859-71 - house used as seminary - likely modifications internally.
- 1880s - many changes, upstairs verandahs probably added this decade.
- 1920 - Buckland has extensive renovations done - upper storey raised approximately 600 mm, second verandah added, whole place rendered outside. Main portion rendered inside. New roof structure and timbers, some joists reused as joists and rafters. Conservatory added and rendered with the remainder of the house. Addition of 32 volt "Delco" electric power system with 26 lights and six power points. One fireplace remodelled. The stables were extended to include the garage.
- 1920s - 1940 - Addition of bathroom, Laundry and bathroom.
- 1939-45 - adapted for military hospital use
- 1942- 1944 - RAAF occupation - any decorative wall finishes removed. Low voltage lighting system removed and new wiring installed. Council electrical power connected. Possible partitioning to form rooms. Earlier "Ward" cooking stove in kitchen replaced with a "Metters" stove. Conservatory converted for use as WRAAF ablution block and the rear portion of the homestead was repaired for use by hospital sisters. Complete overhaul of the water, sewerage and drainage systems.
- 1945- 1950s - Divided into flats. Upper external door, landing and stairs added. Partitioning of some rooms. Plumbing re-done. Some taps in bathrooms carry a 1946 or 1949 manufacturing date. System is copper pipe with "Yorkshire" fittings whilst earlier systems would have been galvanised steel pipe with screwed fittings. Kitchens created.
- 1979 - roof work done. Sarking added and slate replaced. The room on the end of verandah B01/103 identified by the RAAF in 1942 as room 24 appears in good condition in photographs of the homestead held by the National Trust.
- 1990s - Terracotta ridge capping removed, roof sarking, and metal ridge capping added.
- 24/3/2001 Clearing Sale - Auction - all palnt, equipment, tools etc. from former dairy, including c60 x 16m open side farm shed; Full list of items on file S90/5961/2.

== Heritage listing ==
Clydesdale has State significance as one of a series of pre 1840s homesteads in the Hawkesbury area which contributed substantially to the agricultural and pastoral economy of the region, and the understanding of the historical development of colonial New South Wales and the pastoral era of the Cumberland Plain. Its landscape features remain relatively intact, including significant remnant woodlands, Aboriginal relics, two cemeteries (both resting places for the early pioneers of Clydesdale and the district), and its original entry avenue off Richmond Road. The entrance avenue is still discernible for its individual approach and is an example of colonial landscape design that opposed the principles practised in England during the early 19th century. The house retains its original relationship to its landscape setting and farm and is the only remaining example of the lowland model of homestead siting in the Blacktown area and one of three remaining examples intact on the Cumberland Plain. The site derives additional significance for its use as one of only two Marist seminaries in Australia for training South Sea Islander priests in the 1860s, and as a RAAF convalescent home during the 1940s.

Clydesdale was listed on the New South Wales State Heritage Register on 2 April 1999 having satisfied the following criteria.

The place is important in demonstrating the course, or pattern, of cultural or natural history in New South Wales.

Clydesdale has State historical significance for its continuous agricultural use, including cropping, horse stud and dairying, from its grant to Walter Lang in 1813 until the 2000s. The property, in particular the fine quality of the house, illustrates the rise of Charles Tompson from ex convict to significant landholder and the nature of the colonial society that made this rise in class possible. The site also has state significance for its 1860s use as one of only two Marist missionary schools for South-Sea islanders in NSW and as a convalescent hospital for the RAAF during World War Two.

The place has a strong or special association with a person, or group of persons, of importance of cultural or natural history of New South Wales's history.

Clydesdale has state significance for its associations with Charles Tompson Jr, Australia's first native-born poet and is recognised as the first poet to enunciate concepts which have become recognised as part of the Australian self-identity. It also has State significant associations with the Society of Mary (Marists) as one of only two Marist Missionary schools for South Seas Islanders in NSW in the mid to late nineteenth century.

Clydesdale has local significance for its associations with subsequent landowners James Hardie, George Kiss, and J. A. Buckland who developed Clydesdale as a horse stud breeding racehorses and supplying cavalry and police mounts.

The place is important in demonstrating aesthetic characteristics and/or a high degree of creative or technical achievement in New South Wales.

Clydesdale has State aesthetic significance for its largely intact early setting with remnant natural valuation and pastoral setting for the main house and attendant outbuildings and workers cottages and the collection of now mature bunya-bunya pines and Californian Palm Fans which provided a landmark for travellers. The house itself has the symmetry and beauty often associated with Mamre House, Hobartville, Rouse Hill House and Bella Vista.

Clydesdale has local technical significance as one of the few dairies within the Cumberland Plain to convert from traditional labour-intensive milking of cows to a mechanised system in the late 1970s and the installation of the innovative Rotary Dairy (Rotolacta) in the 1980s which is still on site.

The Clydesdale homestead has State technical significance for its retention of much of the form of the house in its 1849 arrangement. Its symmetrical shape, verandahs, and spacious rooms are characteristic of contemporary homesteads such as Mamre (St. Mary's), Hobartville (Windsor), Tebbutt's (Windsor), Rouse Hill House (Rouse Hill) and Bella Vista (Seven Hills).

The Clydesdale property reflects the various architectural tastes and unique colonial landscape design of the early 19th century NSW and this allows the area to be interpreted as a contained landscape unit.

The place has a strong or special association with a particular community or cultural group in New South Wales for social, cultural or spiritual reasons.

Clydesdale has significance at a local level for the local community, demonstrated by the interest shown in the property by local organisations such as the historical societies, and the local council.

The place possesses uncommon, rare or endangered aspects of the cultural or natural history of New South Wales.

The colonial mansion at Clydesdale has State Significance as a rare example of a homestead located in a lowland location. A unique feature for Clydesdale House is that it still remains on that portion of land defined in the original land grant to Lang in 1813, unlike other pre 1840s properties on the Cumberland Plain. It is the last intact estate in NSW from the date of Governor Macquarie's bequest c. 1813.

The place is important in demonstrating the principal characteristics of a class of cultural or natural places/environments in New South Wales.

Clydesdale has State Significance at a representative level as one of a group of five convict built homesteads built to take advantage of the Hawkesbury River system. Together they have the capacity to demonstrate the aims, aesthetics, capacities and social values of the early colonial settlers. Clydesdale is also one of two structures used by the French Marist order as a base from which to train south sea islanders and priests for pacific missions, the other being Villa Maria at Hunters Hill.
