= Electoral district of Londonderry =

Londonderry New South Wales—Legislative Assembly
- Interactive map of district boundaries from the 2023 state election
- State: New South Wales
- Dates current: 1988–present
- MP: Prue Car
- Party: Labor Party
- Namesake: Londonderry
- Electors: 61,482 (2023)
- Area: 184.74 km^{2} (71.3 sq mi)
- Demographic: Outer-metropolitan
- Coordinates: 33°42′7″S 150°46′48″E
Electorates around Londonderry:
Hawkesbury	Hawkesbury	Hawkesbury
Penrith	Londonderry	Riverstone; Blacktown
Penrith	Badgerys Creek	Mount Druitt

Londonderry is an electoral district of the Legislative Assembly in the Australian state of New South Wales. It is represented by Prue Car of the Labor Party and has historically been regarded as a Labor safe seat. It is named after the town of Londonderry in the north of the district.

== History ==
Londonderry as an electoral district was created and first contested in the 1988 New South Wales state election and was named for the town of Londonderry. The new district was won by Labor's Paul Gibson. Londonderry was considered for abolition as part of the Liberal–National Coalition state government's promise to reduce the number of electoral districts but it was preserved following Hawkesbury's Liberal MLA Kevin Rozzoli objecting due to the fact it would have resulted in Castlereagh's dump being in his district.

Gibson would represent Londonderry until 1999 when he was deselected by the Labor Party on the grounds they were expecting an Independent Commission Against Corruption investigation to find against him. When the ICAC review found him innocent, Jim Anderson had already been selected and Gibson moved to stand in Blacktown. Londonderry elected a Labor MP at every election apart from 2011 when the Liberals' Bart Bassett was elected. In the next election, Labor regained the seat with Prue Car, following a redistricting of Londonderry's boundaries as well as Bassett being deselected by the Liberals due to receiving undeclared donations from developers.

== Geography ==
On its current boundaries, Londonderry takes in the suburbs of Berkshire Park, Caddens, Cambridge Park, Castlereagh, Claremont Meadows, Colyton, Jordan Springs, Llandilo, Londonderry, Melonba, Mount Pleasant, North St Marys, Oxley Park, Ropes Crossing, Shanes Park, St Marys, Tregear, Werrington, Werrington County, Werrington Downs, Whalan, Willmot and parts of Agnes Banks, Cranebrook, Emerton, Kingswood, Lethbridge Park, Marsden Park, Mount Druitt and Orchard Hills.

== Members for Londonderry ==
Member	Party	Term
Paul Gibson	Labor	1988–1999
Jim Anderson	Labor	1999–2003
Allan Shearan	Labor	2003–2011
Bart Bassett	Liberal	2011–2014
Bart Bassett	Independent	2014–2015
Prue Car	Labor	2015–present

== Election results ==
2023 New South Wales state election: Londonderry
Party	Candidate	Votes	%	±%
Labor	Prue Car	28,079	54.3	+8.0
Liberal	Samantha Talakola	15,525	30.0	−11.4
One Nation	Luke Tester	4,228	8.2	+8.2
Greens	David Maurice	2,611	5.0	+0.4
Sustainable Australia	David Bowen	1,282	2.5	−1.3
Total formal votes		51,725	96.2	+0.8
Informal votes		2,061	3.8	−0.8
Turnout		53,786	87.5	+4.6
Two-party-preferred result
Labor	Prue Car	30,145	63.7	+10.7
Liberal	Samantha Talakola	17,164	36.3	−10.7
Labor hold		Swing	+10.7	
