= Cambridge Gardens =

- Suburb
- Interactive map of Cambridge Gardens
- Country: Australia
- State: New South Wales
- City: Sydney
- LGA: City of Penrith
- Location: 54 km (34 mi) west of Sydney CBD
- Established: 1981

Government
  - State electorates: Londonderry; Penrith
  - Federal division: Lindsay

Area
  - Total: 0.74 km^{2} (0.29 sq mi)
- Elevation: 35 m (115 ft)

Population
  - Total: 2,030 (2021 census)
  - Density: 2,743/km^{2} (7,100/sq mi)
- Postcode: 2747
Suburbs around Cambridge Gardens
Cranebrook	Jordan Springs	Jordan Springs
Penrith	Cambridge Gardens	Werrington Downs
Penrith	Cambridge Park	Cambridge Park

Cambridge Gardens is a suburb of Sydney, in the state of New South Wales, Australia. Cambridge Gardens is located 54 kilometres west of the Sydney central business district, in the local government area of the City of Penrith and is part of the Greater Western Sydney region.

== History ==
Cambridge Gardens is a relatively new suburb, having only been gazetted in 1981. It was formerly part of the suburb of Cambridge Park.

=== Aboriginal culture ===
Prior to European settlement, what is now Cambridge Gardens was home to the Mulgoa people who spoke the Darug language. They lived a hunter-gatherer lifestyle governed by traditional laws, which had their origins in the Dreamtime. Their homes were bark huts called 'gunyahs'. They hunted kangaroos and emus for meat, and gathered yams, berries and other native plants. Shortly after the arrival of the First Fleet in Australia in 1788, an outbreak of smallpox decimated the local indigenous communities and made it easier for settlers to dispossess them of their land.

=== European settlement ===
The first land grant in the area was made in 1831 to Phillip Parker King, son of the Governor Phillip Gidley King. It became part of the Werrington estate belonging to his sister Mary Lethbridge and was run as a farm until the 1880s when the estate was subdivided into smaller farms. This area was renamed Cambridge Park. In 1978, a second primary school was established in Cambridge Park and given the name Cambridge Gardens Public School. Three years later, the name was adopted for the surrounding area and the suburb of Cambridge Gardens was born.

== Demographics ==
According to the 2021 census of Population, there were 2,030 residents in Cambridge Gardens. 80.4% of people were born in Australia and 87.1% of people spoke only English at home. The most common responses for religion were No Religion 34.7%, Catholic 27.6% and Anglican 17.0%.

== Governance ==
At a local government level, Cambridge Park is part of the north ward of Penrith City Council, represented by Lexie Cettolin, Kevin Crameri, Ross Fowler, Pat Sheehy (currently mayor of Penrith) and John Thain. At the state level, it is part of the Electoral district of Londonderry, represented by Liberals' Bart Bassett. Federally, it is part of the Division of Lindsay, represented by Liberal Party member Fiona Scott.
