= Xavier Catholic College, Llandilo =

Xavier College

Location
- Ninth Avenue, Llandilo, Western Sydney, New South Wales; Australia; 33°42′50″S 150°43′58″E

Information
- Type: Independent co-educational secondary day school
- Motto: For the Greater Good
- Denomination: Roman Catholicism
- Established: 1999
- Founder: Tricia Maidens
- Educational authority: Catholic Education Diocese of Parramatta
- Principal: Michael Pate
- Deputy Principal: Carol Muscat
- Employees: 103
- Years: 7-12
- Enrolment: 1,072 (2016)
- Colours: Black and red
- Website: www.xavierllandilo.catholic.edu.au

Xavier Catholic College, Llandilo is an independent Roman Catholic co-educational secondary day school, located in Llandilo, a western suburb of Sydney, New South Wales, Australia.

== Location ==
The college campus was previously located behind Corpus Christi Primary School, Cranebrook and was then constructed at its current location on Ninth Ave, Llandilo.

== Campus ==
The current Xavier Campus consists of eight main classroom blocks, including a Kirinari block for special education provision. Each building houses a separate faculty's subjects including:

- A: Administration
- B: Technology & Applied Studies
- C: English General Learning
- D: Xavier Centre and Computer Science
- E: Performing Arts
- F: Science
- G: Creative Arts
- H: HSIE & Mathematics
- M: Religious Education (Mary MacKillop Centre)
- Z: Personal Development, Health, and Physical Education (Demountable Area)

== Houses ==
Xavier Catholic College, Llandilo has a prestigious history, some of which has been captured some in the names of the college houses:

- McCormack (Orange) - Saint Irene McCormack.
- MacKillop (Yellow) - Blessed Mary MacKillop (1842–1909) was beatified in 1996 by Pope John Paul II. Canonised in 2010
- Loyola (Purple) - Saint Ignatius Loyola
- Campion (Blue)
- Tenison (Green)
- Faber (White)

== See also ==
- List of Catholic schools in New South Wales
- Catholic education in Australia
