= Dillwynia Correctional Centre =

Dillwynia Women's Correctional Centre
- Interactive map of Dillwynia Women's Correctional Centre
- Location: Berkshire Park, New South Wales; 33°38′50″S 150°46′49″E
- Status: Operational
- Security class: Minimum to medium (Female)
- Managed by: Corrective Services NSW
- Website: Dillwynia
- Building details

General information
- Completed: 2003
- Client: NSW Dept Of Public Works

Design and construction
- Architect: NSW Public Works
- Engineer: Richard Crookes Constructions

Dillwynia Correctional Centre is a prison for women located on the grounds of the Francis Greenway Correctional Complex in Berkshire Park, a suburb of Sydney, Australia. The centre is operated by the Corrective Services division of the New South Wales Department of Communities and Justice, and holds inmates sentenced under State or Australian criminal law.

The centre opened in 2003 and takes its name from Dillwynia, a genus of Australian flower, some species of which are native to Western Sydney.

Dillwynia accommodates both minimum- and medium-security inmates.
