= Francis Greenway Correctional Complex =

Prison in Australia

Francis Greenway (formerly John Morony) Correctional Complex
- Interactive map of Francis Greenway (formerly John Morony) Correctional Complex
- Location: Berkshire Park, New South Wales; 33°39′6.68″S 150°47′2.73″E
- Status: Operational
- Security class: Minimum (male and female)
- Managed by: Corrective Services NSW

Francis Greenway Correctional Complex, formerly John Morony Correctional Complex is an Australian minimum security prison complex for males and females located in Berkshire Park, 5 kilometres (3 mi) south of Windsor in New South Wales, Australia. The complex is operated by Corrective Services NSW, an agency of the Department of Communities and Justice, of the Government of New South Wales.

The complex comprises three separate correctional facilities, two for men and one for women: the John Morony Correctional Centre; the Geoffrey Pearce Correctional Centre (formerly Outer Metropolitan Multi Purpose Correctional Centre); and Dillwynia Correctional Centre.

== History ==
The complex was originally named after a former commissioner, John Morony, who rose up through the ranks from a prison officer to become Comptroller General of the New South Wales Department of Corrective Services. He retired in 1971 and took up a position on the New South Wales Parole Board, which he had been instrumental in setting up.

The complex is built over the former boys' home Daruk Training School, also known as Daruk Boys' Home, Dharruk Boys Training School and Daruk Training Farm, was built in 1960 at Windsor. Until its closure in approximately 1985 the home housed hundreds of wards of the state and juvenile prisoners of school age. During the Royal Commission into Child Sexual Abuse, severe physical and sexual abuse was found to have occurred at the institution. Children who complained of abuse at the time it occurred were ignored or disbelieved. It served as an extension to Mount Penang Training School for Boys, also known as Gosford Farm Home, which housed older boys.

On 7 May 2020, the complex was renamed the Francis Greenway Correctional Complex, after Francis Greenway, an English-born architect who was transported to Australia as a convict in 1814 and went on to become Australia's first government architect.

== Description ==
The complex comprises three separate correctional facilities: the John Morony Correctional Centre, a medium-security correctional centre for men; the Geoffrey Pearce Correctional Centre (formerly Outer Metropolitan Multi Purpose Correctional Centre), a minimum-security correctional centre for men; and Dillwynia Correctional Centre, a minimum/medium-security correctional centre for women.

The complex accepts prisoners charged and convicted under New South Wales and/or Commonwealth legislation.

Additional administrative units of Corrective Services NSW are located on-site including the Security & Intelligence Branch, the Specialised Training Unit, the Drug Detector Dog Unit and the Pre Release Programs Unit.

== John Morony Correctional Centre ==
The John Morony Correctional Centre, an Australian low-security facility for males, is located within the complex. The complex has a world-famous wildlife centre which gives inmates the chance to work with the NSW Wildlife Information Rescue and Education Service (WIRES) and Sydney Metropolitan Wildlife Services, caring for around 250 injured, orphaned and sick animals.

== Geoffrey Pearce Correctional Centre ==
The Geoffrey Pearce Correctional Centre, an Australian minimum-security facility for males, is located within the complex. A special program unit attached to the Centre, called the RSPCA NSW – CS NSW Dog Rehabilitation Program. This program rehabilitates dogs for re-housing and offers specialised offender educational opportunities. The Dog Rehabilitation Program is conducted under the supervision of correctional officers who also have access to training and development opportunities related to animal studies.

== Dillwynia Correctional Centre ==
The Dillwynia Women's Correctional Centre, an Australian low-to-medium-security facility for females, is located within the complex. Dillwynia was opened in 2004 as the first purpose built female correctional facility in New South Wales and was specially constructed to meet the needs and demands of the increasing female population. The proposal to build Dillwynia had prompted great outcry from women's organisations, and led to the Legislative Council inquiry "The Select Committee on the Increase in Prisoner Population".

A special program unit is attached to the Centre, called the Greyhounds as Pets Program. This collaborative project between Corrective Services NSW and Greyhound Racing NSW rehabilitates greyhounds for re-housing and offers specialised offender educational opportunities. The Greyhounds as Pets Program is conducted under the supervision of correctional officers who also have access to training and development opportunities related to animal studies.

== Incidents ==
Nathan Reynolds, a 36-year-old Aboriginal man, died in the last week of his four-month sentence after an asthma attack in the minimum-security John Morony Correctional Centre (now part of the Francis Greenway Correction Complex) in Sydney in September 2018. The coronial inquiry showed that the prison staff's response was "unreasonably delayed", and contributed to his death.

== See also ==
- Punishment in Australia
