= Outer Sydney Orbital =

Proposed corridor in Western Sydney for motorway and freight rail line

Outer Sydney Orbital New South Wales

General information
- Type: Motorway (Proposed)
- Opened: ≈ 2030 (estimated)
- Route number(s): (or)

Major junctions
- North end: Gosford
- South end: Wollongong

Highway system
- Highways in Australia; National Highway • Freeways in Australia; Highways in New South Wales

The Outer Sydney Orbital is a proposed corridor for a motorway and freight rail line in Western Sydney. The motorway is proposed to be signposted M9 or M10. Sydney Outer Orbital motorway will be connecting Gosford – Western Sydney Airport – Wollongong.

Outer Ring road will be connecting through Campbelltown, Penrith and Richmond Road.

== Alignment ==
The preferred corridor alignments of the Outer Sydney Orbital have been announced for the following sections:

- Stage 1: between Richmond Road and Hume Motorway - announced in June 2018
- Stage 2 Sector 1: between Hume Motorway and Appin Road east of Appin - announced in August 2021

As of August 2021, corridor identification will continue for:

- Stage 2 Sector 2: Appin Road and Picton Road corridors
- Stage 2 Sector 3: connections in the Illawarra including a potential new Illawarra escarpment crossing.

Grade separated interchanges will be provided at:

- Richmond Road
- Bells Line of Road – Castlereagh Connection: a connection road to Bells Line of Road at Kurrajong via Castlereagh
- Great Western Highway
- M4 Western Motorway
- Southern Access Road (BWSEA)
- Luddenham Road / M12 Motorway / Elizabeth Drive / The Northern Road
- Bringelly Road / Greendale Road
- Camden Valley Way
- Hume Motorway
- Appin Road

== History ==
As part of economic development of Western Sydney, including the construction of the Western Sydney Airport at Badgerys Creek, The Northern Road was proposed to be upgraded to a grade separated motorway. The proposal, then known as the M9 Outer-Western Sydney Orbital motorway, would link the M31 Hume Motorway at Menangle with the Central Coast via Camden, Penrith and Windsor.

As part of the State Budget 2014–15, the NSW Government announced a $5.5 billion road package for Western Sydney. It includes $4.6 million for planning the M9 Motorway. The preferred corridor for the motorway was expected to be announced later in 2014 before plans are made for reserving land.

The Outer Sydney Orbital was split into a few stages for separate corridor identification:

- Stage 1: between Box Hill and Hume Motorway
- Stage 2: between Hume Motorway and Appin Road east of Appin

In June 2018, it was announced that the Stage 1 orbital will consist of a 10 km tunnel between Cobbitty to Cawdor, and the number of properties to be acquired will drop from 1,247 to 825, with the number of homes affected down to 200, to the relief of the community. The orbital was originally planned to cut through the town of Cobbitty. The northern end of the orbital was also truncated from Box Hill to Richmond Road at Marsden Park.

Community consultation for the Stage 2 corridor was undertaken between November 2020 and January 2021. In August 2021, the preferred corridor for Stage 2 from Hume Motorway and Appin Road was confirmed.
