= Fossil and Petrology collections, New South Wales =

Fossil and Petrology collections
- Location within Sydney Location within Australia
- 33°41′02″S 150°43′49″E
- Location: 947-953 Londonderry Road, Londonderry, City of Penrith, New South Wales, Australia

History
- Built: 1870–

Site notes
- Owner: NSW Department of Primary Industries

New South Wales Heritage Register
- Official name: Fossil Collection; Petrology Collection
- Type: State heritage (movable / collection)
- Designated: 2 April 1999
- Reference no.: 971 and 973
- Type: Contents (movable)
- Category: Government and Administration

The Fossil and Petrology collections are heritage-listed collections of Australian artefacts owned by the New South Wales Department of Primary Industries. They are on display at the Londonderry Drillcore Library in the W.B. Clark Geoscience Centre, located in the western Sydney suburb of Londonderry, New South Wales. The collections were added to the New South Wales State Heritage Register on 2 April 1999.

== Description ==
=== Fossil collection ===
The fossil collection is assessed as State Significance. Fossils by their nature are unique and irreplaceable; unlike extant organisms, they can not be replaced. The fossil collections of the Geological Survey of NSW comprise subsets of

1. larger specimens still in rock matrix,
2. microfossils prepared from the matrix, and
3. thin sections prepared for microscope examination.

These are not only a unique record of the geological history of the state, but also form the database on which are founded many hundreds of scientific publications and internal reports of this Department. The form the evidence upon which the conclusions of those reports and publications are made, and, being irreplaceable, need to be retained as documentation as necessary as the reports themselves, available for subsequent examination in the light of new ideas or information. Many of the specimens are the reference points on which plant and animal fossil taxa are based 9 type specimen: holotypes, paratypes etc.), the proper preservation of which forms a requirement of both the International Code of Zoological Nomenclature (ICZN) and its Botanical counterpart (ICBN).

The collections are documented in hard-copy catalogues and to some extent in digital databases. The major collection of larger specimens (item a) numbers close to 40,000 specimens; the remainder amount to approximately an additional 10,000, cardboard slides. In addition to their scientific value, many of them are of display quality. The collections form a reference point for stratigraphy and paleontology in New South Wales. They are also a source of information for researchers throughout the world.

=== Petrology collection ===
The Petrology Collection contains 70,000 rocks and thin sections. It was started in the 1870s as two separate collections, one with 9,000 rocks and the other with 43000 thin sections. Hand written catalogues exist for each. After 1912, only one collection was continued up to the present day. The two old subcollections have much more significance than their sizes would indicate, because much of the material comes from old mine sites, and many of these are no longer available for sampling. Furthermore, a few samples, have world significance, such as the thin section from the very sample of Copeton dolerite containing diamond. Many samples in the recent part of the Petrology collection are either irreplaceable or extremely expensive to replace, such as the samples from the Snowy Mountain tunnels or the samples from drill holes.

Hand written catalogues from the older parts of the collection are no longer used much because the information has been captured into the ROCKS database. However the old and newer parts of the collection are stored together and are frequently accessed on a day-to-day basis.

There is a potential heritage value for parts of the Petrology Collections and Catalogues. The historical Catalogues could be archived without hampering use of the collection. The historic parts of the collection are used routinely now and must remain open to supervised access.

== Heritage listing ==
As at 14 February 2001, fossils by their nature are unique and irreplaceable; unlike extant organisms, they cannot be replaced. The fossil collections of the Geological Survey of NSW comprise subsets of:

1. larger specimens still in rock matrix,
2. microfossils prepared from the matrix, and
3. thin sections prepared for microscope examination. These are a unique record of the geological history of the state.

The major collection of larger specimens (item 1) numbers close to 40,000 specimens; the remainder amount to approximately an additional 10,000, cardboard slides. In addition to their scientific value, many of them are of display quality. The collections form a reference point for stratigraphy and paleontology in New South Wales. They are also a source of information for researchers throughout the world. This collection is identified as State Significant.

As at 21 November 2000, the Petrology Collection has been assessed as State significance. It contains 70,000 rocks and thin section. It was started in the 1870s as two separate collections, one with 9,000 rocks and the other with 43000 thin sections.

The Fossil and Petrology Collections were listed on the New South Wales State Heritage Register on 2 April 1999.

== See also ==
- Fossils of Australia
