= Melonba =

- Suburb
- Interactive map of Melonba
- Coordinates: 33°41′52″S 150°47′53″E
- Country: Australia
- State: New South Wales
- LGA: City of Blacktown
- Location: 52 km (32 mi) north-west of Sydney CBD
- Established: 2020

Government
  - State electorate: Londonderry
  - Federal division: Chifley

Area
  - Total: 4.8 km^{2} (1.9 sq mi)
- Elevation: 18 m (59 ft)

Population
  - Total: 1,439 (SAL 2021)
- Postcode: 2765
Suburbs around Melonba
Berkshire Park	Berkshire Park	Berkshire Park
Berkshire Park Shanes Park	Melonba	Marsden Park
Shanes Park	Shanes Park	Marsden Park

Melonba is a suburb of Sydney, in the state of New South Wales, Australia. Melonba is located approximately 51 kilometres (32 mi) north-west of the Sydney CBD in the local government area of Blacktown.

== History ==
Melonba is situated in the Darug traditional Aboriginal country. Melonba was approved as a suburb on 7 September 2020 and gazetted on 6 November 2020. Prior to the suburb's creation, the area was part of Marsden Park.

The origin of the suburb name is from the Dharug Aboriginal language meaning a type of wattle found in the area.

== Schools ==
Melonba High School, established in 2024 .
