= Llandilo =

- Suburb
- Interactive map of Llandilo
- Country: Australia
- State: New South Wales
- City: Sydney
- LGA: Penrith City Council
- Location: 55 km (34 mi) west of Sydney CBD

Government
  - State electorate: Londonderry
  - Federal division: Lindsay

Area
  - Total: 22.56 km^{2} (8.71 sq mi)
- Elevation: 36 m (118 ft)

Population
  - Total: 1,618 (2021 census)
  - Density: 71.72/km^{2} (185.75/sq mi)
- Postcode: 2747
Suburbs around Llandilo
Londonderry	Berkshire Park	Berkshire Park; Marsden Park
Cranebrook	Llandilo	Shanes Park
Cranebrook	Jordan Springs	Ropes Crossing

Llandilo is a suburb of Sydney, in the state of New South Wales, Australia. It is 55 kilometres north-west of the Sydney central business district, within the local government area of the City of Penrith, which is a part of the Greater Western Sydney region. The suburb is a small, semi-rural, outcrop suburb between two creeks that houses small acreages, hobby farms, and horse-raising properties.

Llandilo's western border is shared with Cranebrook, its northern border shared with Berkshire Park, and its eastern border with Shanes Park shaped by South Creek.

A southern part of Llandilo was incorporated into an expansion of the suburb of Jordan Springs on 22 November 2019.

== History ==
Llandilo is named after the Welsh town of Llandeilo.

=== Aboriginal culture ===
Prior to European settlement, what is now Llandilo was home to the Mulgoa people who spoke the Darug language. They lived a hunter-gatherer lifestyle governed by traditional laws, which had their origins in the Dreamtime. Their homes were bark huts called 'gunyahs'. They hunted kangaroos and emus for meat, and gathered yams, berries and other native plants. Shortly after the arrival of the First Fleet in Australia in 1788, an outbreak of smallpox decimated the local indigenous communities and made it easier for settlers to dispossess them of their land.

=== European settlement ===
The first land grant in the area was made to Samuel Terry in 1818. He named the area Terry Brook. South Creek Parish baptismal registers show the name in use by at least 1845, with various spellings including "Llandiloes". While the landholdings have reduced in size down to around one or 2 acres (8,100 m^{2}), the area is still primarily rural as it has been for the past 200 years or so.

Llandilo Post Office opened on 1 July 1890.

== Demographics ==
According to the Australian Bureau of Statistics, in the 2021 census, Llandilo had a population of 1,618 divided between men (50.4%) and women (49.6%). It had 410 families. Currently, Llandilo has a median age of 38.

Llandilo had an Aboriginal and Torres Strait Islander population of 70, or 4.3%, in 2021, higher than the 3.2% of the Australian nation. Respondents in the 2021 census reported a 27.9% Maltese ancestry, 22.9% English ancestry, a 9.2% Italian ancestry, and a 5.7% Irish ancestry. Therefore, Llandilo had a higher proportion of respondents reporting Maltese and Italian ancestry than the nation average. Likewise, respondents report having been born in Malta and Italy at higher percentages than the average.

50% of census respondents reported being Catholic, 21.1% as no religion, 9.9% Anglican, 6.1% unstated, and 2.7% Eastern Orthodox.

== Schools ==
The local school is Llandilo Public, established 1866.

Xavier College, a Catholic secondary school, was completed in 2008.
