= Werrington County =

- Suburb
- Interactive map of Werrington County
- Coordinates: 33°45′54″S 150°45′4″E
- Country: Australia
- State: New South Wales
- City: Sydney
- LGA: Penrith City Council
- Location: 50 km (31 mi) west of Sydney CBD

Government
  - State electorate: Londonderry
  - Federal division: Lindsay

Area
  - Total: 2.09 km^{2} (0.81 sq mi)
- Elevation: 40 m (130 ft)

Population
  - Total: 3,698 (2021 census)
  - Density: 1,769/km^{2} (4,583/sq mi)
- Postcode: 2747
Suburbs around Werrington County
Jordan Springs	Jordan Springs	St Marys
Werrington Downs	Werrington County	St Marys
Cambridge Park	Werrington	Werrington

Werrington County is a suburb of Sydney, in the state of New South Wales, Australia. It is 50 kilometres (31 mi) west of the Sydney central business district, in the local government area of the City of Penrith and is part of the Greater Western Sydney region. The suburb is entirely residential with a high proportion of individual separate dwellings.

Werrington County is part of the Indigenous Australian, Darug nation and is located in the Deerubbin Local Aboriginal Land Council Area.

== History ==
=== Aboriginal culture ===
Prior to European settlement, what is now Werrington County was home to the Mulgoa people who spoke the Darug language, as part of the Darug Nation. They lived a hunter-gatherer lifestyle governed by traditional laws, which had their origins in the Dreamtime. Their homes were bark huts called 'gunyahs'. They hunted kangaroos and emus for meat, and gathered yams, berries and other native plants. Shortly after the arrival of the First Fleet in Australia in 1788, an outbreak of smallpox decimated the local indigenous communities and made it easier for settlers to dispossess them of their land.

=== Post European arrival ===
In 1806, Werrington County was established as part of a land grant to Mary King, the youngest daughter of Governor Philip Gidley King. Werrington County was then farm land until the early 1980s when land lots were sold for the residential and commercial buildings in the present day suburb.

== Geography ==
Werrington County is geographically at a higher altitude than most other suburbs in the Penrith area. Werrington Creek runs on the eastern border of the suburb. Werrington Lakes lies on the southwestern corner of the suburb.

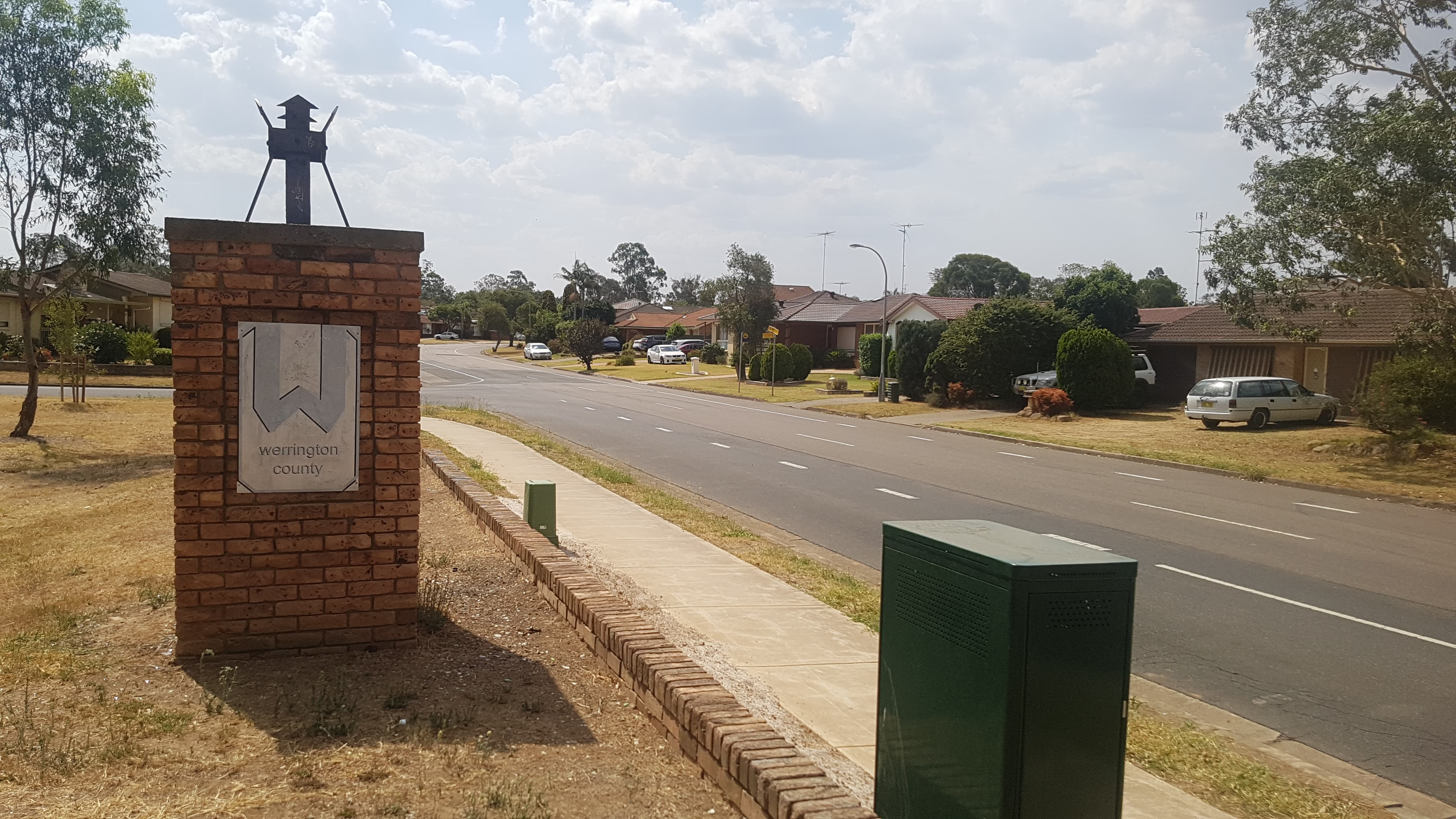
Werrington County Southern Border

== Commercial area ==
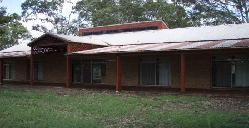
Namatjira Neighbourhood Centre

Werrington County is home to a Child Care centre, Werrington County Shopping Village, Namatjira Neighbourhood Centre, Tennis, Golf, Squash and other sporting facilities. The suburb is also within a few minutes drive to St Marys Shopping Centre located in St Marys, New South Wales which hosts over 40 retailers.

== Demographics ==
As per the 2021 Census there were 3,698 residents in Werrington County with a median weekly household income of $2,042 compared to the national average of $1,746. 49.7% were males and 50.3% were females. The median age was 37 years. 79.1% of people were born in Australia. The top other countries of birth were England 3.0%, New Zealand 2.1%, India 1.5%, Philippines 1.0% and Scotland 0.8%. The most common ancestries were Australian 39.4%, English 36.5%, Irish 10.4%, Scottish 8.5% and Aboriginal and/or Torres Strait Islander 6.1%. The top responses for religious affiliation were No Religion 33.7%, Catholic 28.4%, Anglican 16.8%, Not stated 6.3% and Christian, nfd 2.1%. The majority of people (85.7%) only spoke English at home with the other languages spoken being Arabic 0.7%, Punjabi 0.6%, Hindi 0.5%, Italian 0.5% and Tagalog 0.4%.

== Schools ==
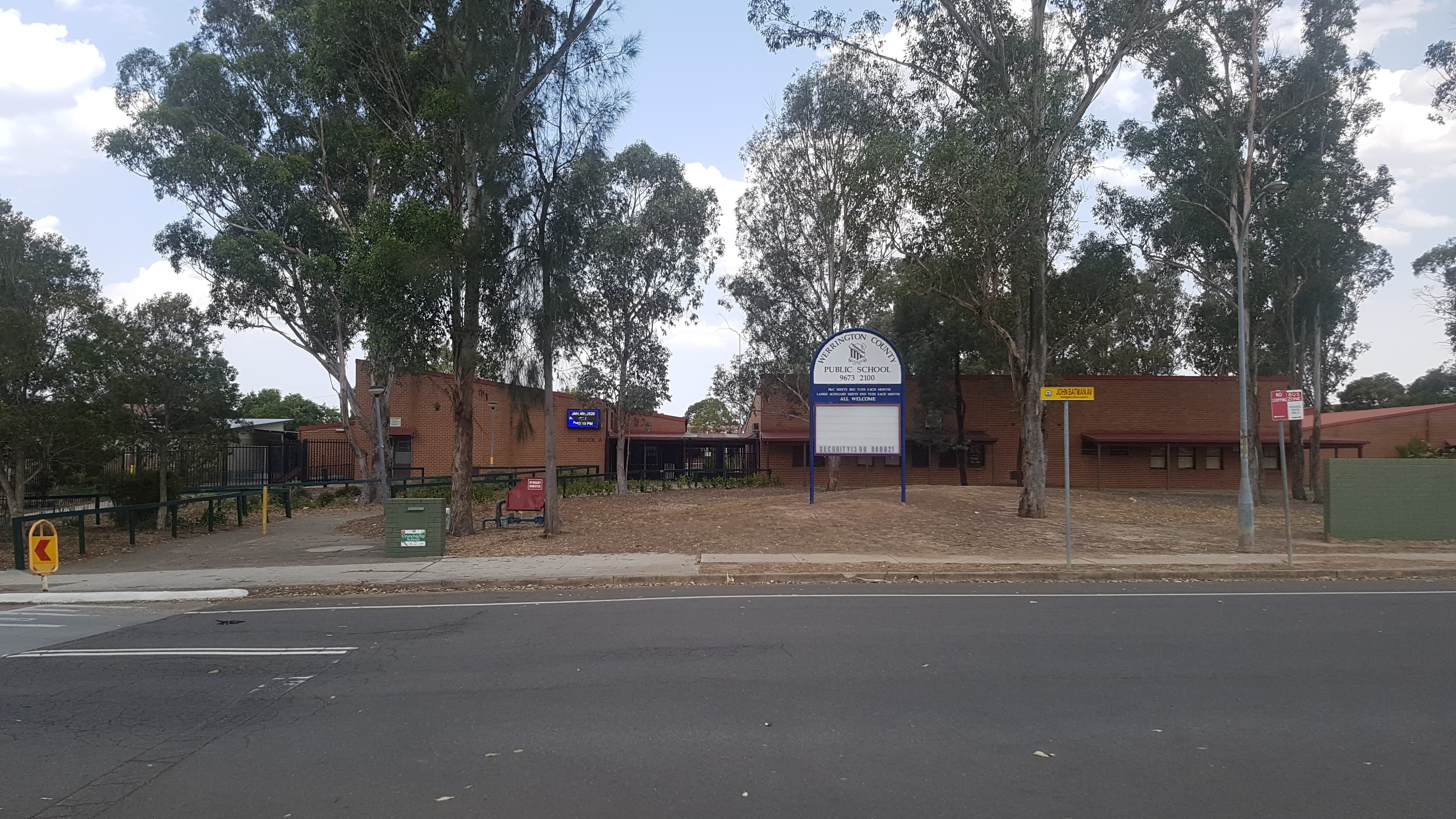
Werrington County Public School

Werrington County Public School is located in John Batman Avenue. The primary school was established in 1982. The school was officially opened in 1993 and enjoys a fine reputation within the Penrith District. The nearest High School is Cambridge Park High School in Cambridge Park, New South Wales.

== Parks and reserves ==
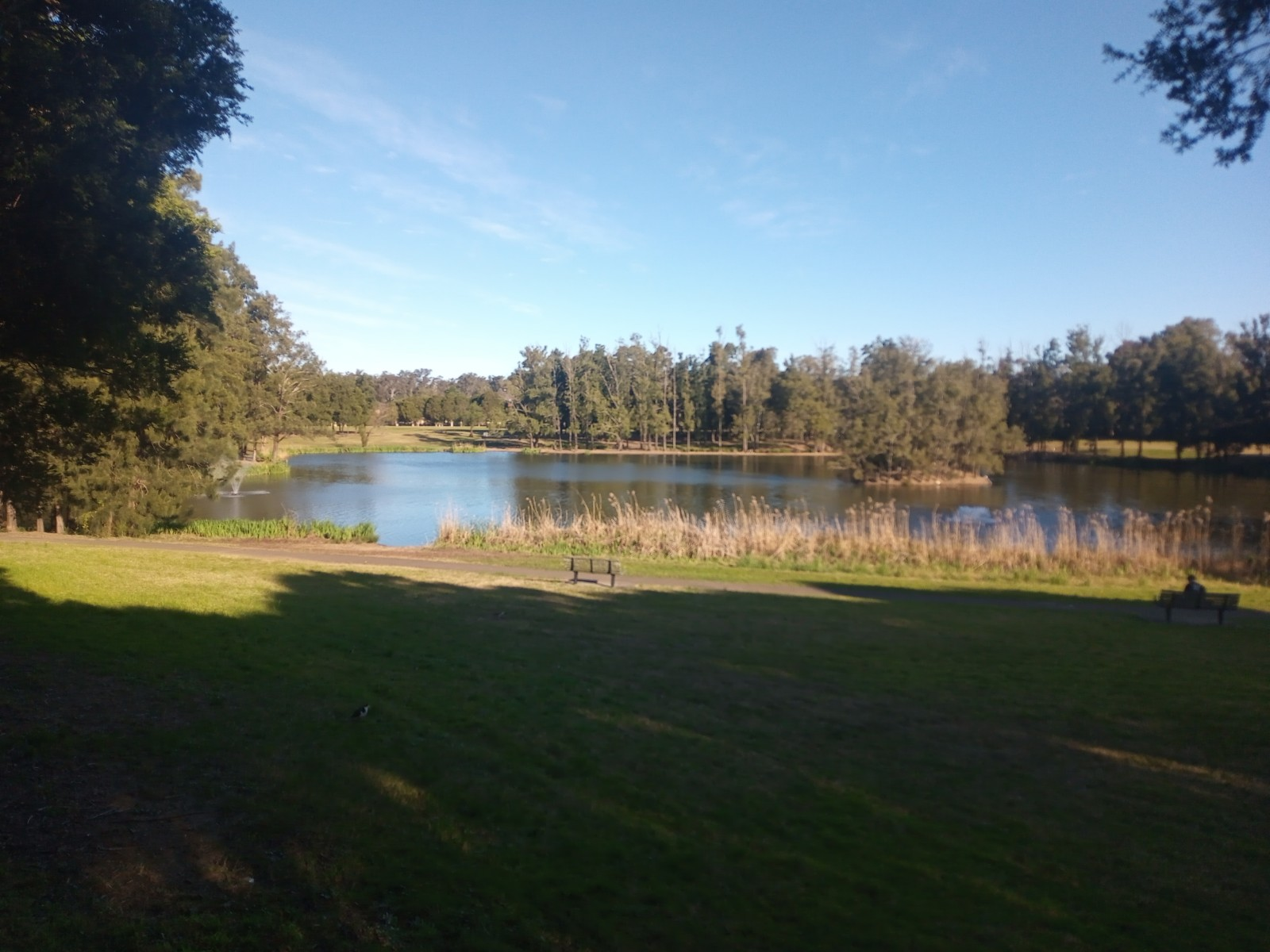
Werrington Lake - 2022

Werrington County has 5 parks covering nearly 29% of the total area which include Shaw Park, Ellison Reserve and Werrington Lakes Flora & Fauna Reserve.

== Hospital ==
The nearest Hospital is Nepean Hospital in Penrith which provides multi-speciality Medical services. Werrington County also has a Medical centre at the Werrington County Shopping Village.

== Transport ==
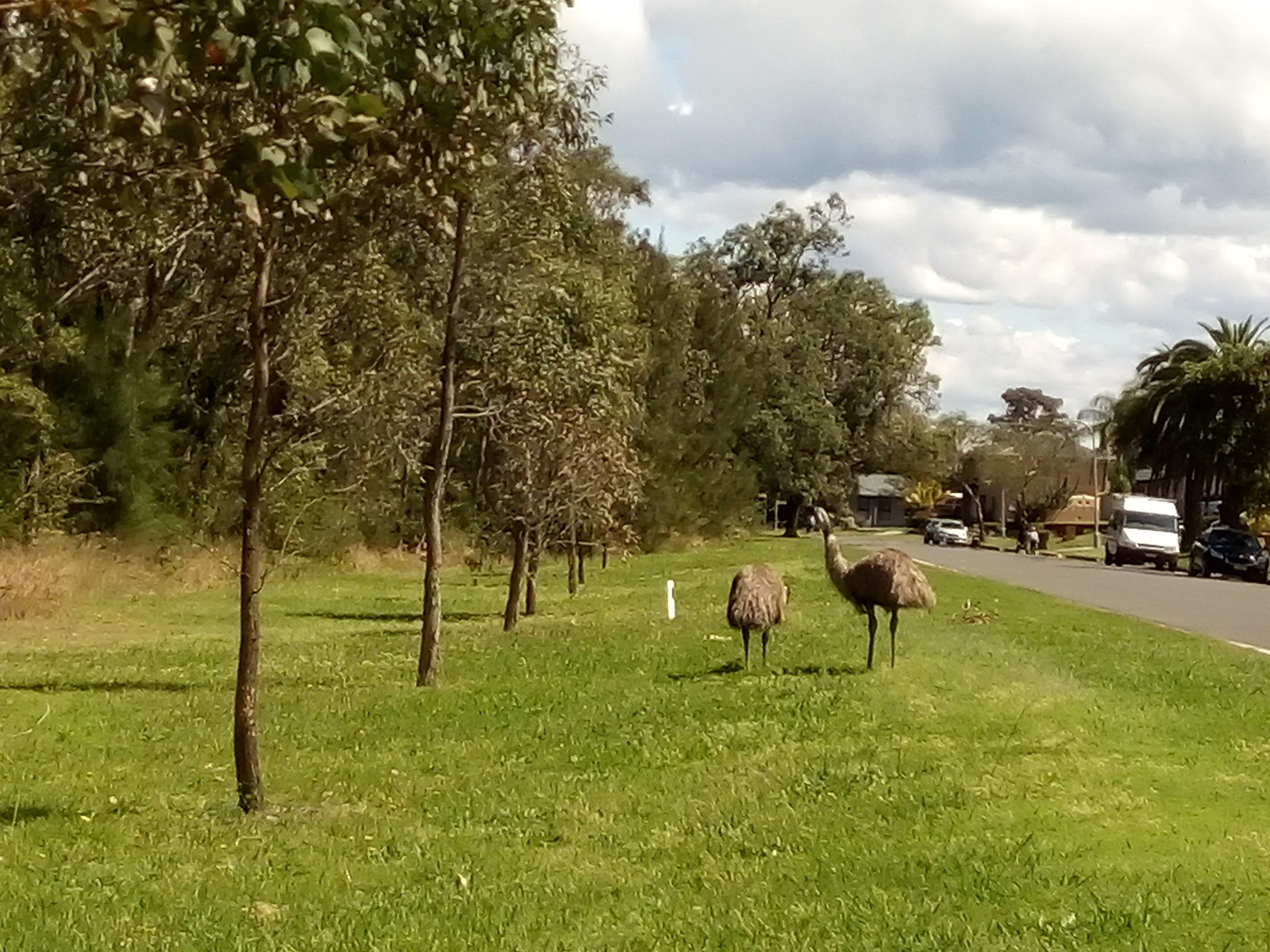
Emu's walking along Ellison reserve in Werrington County, Sydney. 2022

Werrington County has quick and easy access to Penrith by travelling west on Dunheved Road or along Great Western Highway. The suburb is serviced by the Great Western Highway and is also in close proximity to the M4 Western Motorway which can be accessed via Kent Road for residents travelling towards the Sydney CBD.

The nearest railway station is Werrington railway station on the T1 Western Line which provides direct train services to the Sydney CBD.

Busways provides 3 bus services around the Werrington County area.

- Route 780 travels along Dunheved Road past the Werrington County Shopping Village before travelling to either Penrith or Mount Druitt via Ropes Crossing
- Route 782 travels around Greenbank Drive and Henry Lawson Avenue before travelling to either Penrith or St Marys.
- Route 785 travels via Cambridge Park to Werrington railway station covering parts of Werrington County.

== Governance ==
At a local government level, Werrington County is part of the north ward of Penrith City Council, represented by Ross Fowler (Mayor of Penrith). At the state level, it is part of the Electoral district of Londonderry, represented by Labor Party member Prue Car. Federally, it is part of the Division of Lindsay, represented by Liberal Party Melissa McIntosh.

Werrington County is located in the Deerubbin Local Aboriginal Land Council Area.
