= Ropes Crossing =

Suburb of Sydney, New South Wales, Australia

- Suburb
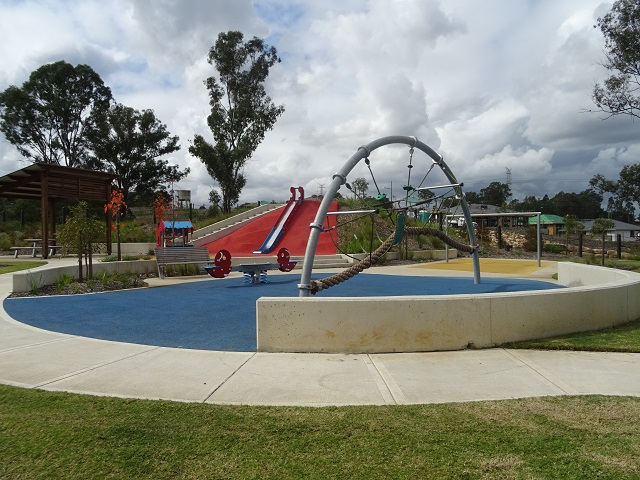
- Playground on Susannah Drive, Ropes Crossing

- Interactive map of Ropes Crossing
- Coordinates: 33°43′59″S 150°47′28″E
- Country: Australia
- State: New South Wales
- City: Sydney
- LGA: City of Blacktown
- Location: 49 km (30 mi) west of Sydney CBD

Government
  - State electorate: Londonderry
  - Federal division: Chifley
- Elevation: 41 m (135 ft)

Population
  - Total: 7,280 (2021 census)
- Postcode: 2760
Suburbs around Ropes Crossing
Llandilo	Shanes Park	Willmot
Jordan Springs	Ropes Crossing	Lethbridge Park
St Marys	North St Marys	Tregear

Ropes Crossing is a suburb of Blacktown, Sydney in the state of New South Wales, Australia. Ropes Crossing is located 49 kilometres (30 mi) west of the Sydney central business district, in the local government area of the City of Blacktown and is part of the Greater Western Sydney region.

== History ==
Ropes Crossing was originally part of the suburb of St Marys. The suburb is named as a crossing of Ropes Creek, a watercourse which is approximately 23 kilometres (14 mi) long rising near Devils Back Tunnel and flowing north into South Creek. The creek itself was named for Anthony Rope, a First Fleet convict who it is assumed was granted land fronting the creek.

The area was the site of a World War II munitions area, now formerly known as Australian Defence Industries or (ADI). The area had its own railway line which was electrified in 1957. When the line first opened on 1 May 1942, it only ran from St Marys to Dunheved at a distance of 50.350 rail kilometres from Central railway station and on 29 June 1942 the line opened from Dunheved to Ropes Creek at 53.010 rail kilometres from Sydney.

When electrification was extended on the western line in the late 1950s a new station was built and called Cochrane and was located 52.480 rail kilometres from Sydney. The station opened on 2 September 1957. The line was mainly munitions traffic with morning and afternoon passenger services for munitions workers. Towards the end of the line being open, the only traffic seen on the line was the occasional scrap metal trains that visited Sims Metal which was located off the Up line just south of Dunheved. Working of these trains meant that the trains worked to Dunheved where the locomotive ran around the train and proceeded back to the Sims Metal Siding to shunt loaded cars in and empties out as required.

== Suburb facilities ==
=== Housing ===
As of 2013, the suburb is being developed for housing by Lend Lease with up to 2,200 homes and will contain a regional park in the centre. Housing is divided up into five villages – Aurora, Barinya, Brookwood, Talloway and Woodlands. Rochford Place is allocated as "Over 55's Living".

=== School ===
Ropes Crossing Public School was opened in 2008.

== Population ==
In the 2021 census, Ropes Crossing recorded a population of 7,280 people.
