= Tregear, New South Wales =

Tregear
- Suburb
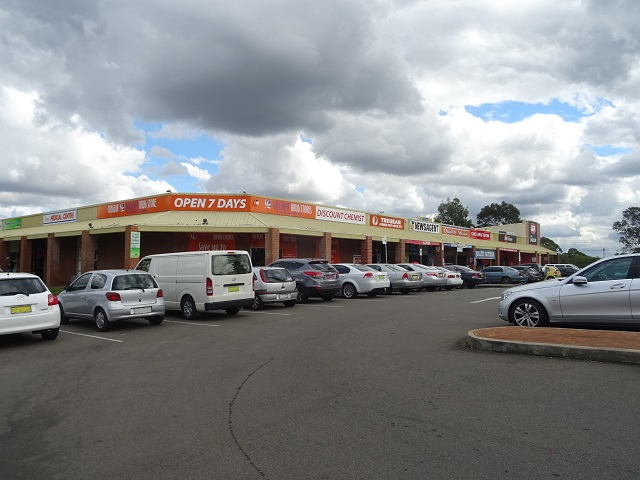
- Tregear shops

- Interactive map of Tregear
- Coordinates: 33°45′0″S 150°47′40″E
- Country: Australia
- State: New South Wales
- City: Sydney
- LGA: City of Blacktown
- Location: 46 km (29 mi) west of Sydney CBD

Government
  - State electorate: Mount Druitt
  - Federal division: Chifley

Area
  - Total: 1.63 km^{2} (0.63 sq mi)
- Elevation: 56 m (184 ft)

Population
  - Total: 3,700 (2021 census)
  - Density: 2,270/km^{2} (5,880/sq mi)
- Postcode: 2770
Suburbs around Tregear
North St Marys	Lethbridge Park	Ropes Crossing
Dunheved	Tregear	Emerton
St Marys	Whalan	Whalan

Tregear is a suburb of Sydney, in the state of New South Wales, Australia. Tregear is 47 kilometres (29 mi) west of the Sydney central business district, in the local government area of the City of Blacktown and is part of the Greater Western Sydney region.

At the 2021 census, Tregear had 3,700 people listing Tregear as their usual residence. There were slightly more men than women, 15.9% were Indigenous and 30.1% were born overseas. The land area amounts to 163 hectares.

== History ==
Tregear was the name of a homestead built in the area which at one stage was owned by John King-Lethbridge, son of Robert Copland Lethbridge and Mary King. It was named after the Lethbridge family's estate in Cornwall, England. The land was held by Lethbridge family until 1942 when it was taken over by the RAAF and then sold in 1951.

== Shopping & Public amenities ==
Tregear features a small local shopping centre with an IGA supermarket, chemist, post office, newsagent, kebab and fish and chips takeaway store and the Tregear Medical Centre. A small car park sits at the front of the complex, along with a public pay phone.

Nearby shopping areas include a 10-minute drive to Westfield Mount Druitt Shopping Centre, 20-minute drive to Penrith Westfield Shopping Centre, 5-minute drive to Emerton Village Shopping Centre, 5-minute drive to Ropes Crossing Village Shopping Centre and a 7-minute drive to St Marys' main strip.

== Education ==
- Tregear Public Primary School
- Tregear Presbyterian Preschool Kindergarten
- Mini Masterminds Tregear

== Recreation ==
Tregear Reserve spans a large portion of the suburb. Its walking path follows Ropes Creek for roughly 1.6 km, passing the fenced designated off‑leash dog park, the baseball field, and continuing all the way through to Whalan Reserve.

== Transport ==
Tregear is serviced by regular public bus routes that connect directly to St Marys, the area’s primary commercial and transport hub. From St Marys Station, you can reach the Sydney CBD in under an hour via frequent T1 Western Line express services, head west toward Penrith, or soon take the new Metro line to the Western Sydney Airport, with a travel time of less than 15 minutes.
