= Werrington Downs =

- Suburb
- Interactive map of Werrington Downs
- Coordinates: 33°44′21″S 150°43′38″E
- Country: Australia
- State: New South Wales
- City: Sydney
- LGA: City of Penrith
- Location: 52 km (32 mi) west of Sydney CBD
- Established: 1976

Government
  - State electorate: Londonderry
  - Federal division: Lindsay

Area
  - Total: 1.09 km^{2} (0.42 sq mi)
- Elevation: 47 m (154 ft)

Population
  - Total: 3,221 (2021 census)
  - Density: 2,955/km^{2} (7,650/sq mi)
- Postcode: 2747
Suburbs around Werrington Downs
Cambridge Gardens	Jordan Springs	Jordan Springs
Cambridge Gardens	Werrington Downs	Werrington County
Cambridge Park	Cambridge Park	Werrington County

Werrington Downs is a suburb of Western Sydney. It is 52 kilometres (32 mi) west of the Sydney central business district, in the local government area of the City of Penrith and is part of the Greater Western Sydney region.

== History ==
=== Aboriginal culture ===
Prior to European settlement, what is now Werrington Downs was home to the Mulgoa people who spoke the Darug language. They lived a hunter-gatherer lifestyle governed by traditional laws, which had their origins in the Dreamtime. Their homes were bark huts called 'gunyahs'. They hunted kangaroos and emus for meat, and gathered yams, berries and other native plants. Shortly after the arrival of the First Fleet in Australia in 1788, an outbreak of smallpox decimated the local indigenous communities and made it easier for settlers to dispossess them of their land.

=== European settlement ===
The first land grant in the area was made in 1831 to Phillip Parker King, son of the Governor Phillip Gidley King. It became part of the Werrington estate belonging to his sister Mary Lethbridge and was run as a farm until the 1880s when subdivision began. Widespread residential development didn't begin until the 1970s when Landcom began building in the area. The suburb's name was gazetted in 1976.

== Demographics ==
As per the 2021 Census, the most common ancestries in Werrington Downs were Australian 42.2%, English 37.8%, Irish 8.8%, Scottish 8.3% and Australian Aboriginal 6.6%. 80.9% of people were born in Australia with a median weekly household income of $2,139. The most common countries of birth were England 3.4%, India 1.5%, New Zealand 1.1%, Philippines 1.0% and Lebanon 0.9%. The most common occupations in Werrington Downs included Clerical and Administrative Workers 17.8%, Technicians and Trades Workers 16.0%, Professionals 14.8%, Community and Personal Service Workers 12.3% and Managers 10.9%.

== Transport ==
Werrington Downs is serviced by one bus route, provided by Busways. Route 782 provides a link between Penrith and Werrington Railway Stations, with the bus starting at St Marys Interchange travelling along Trinity Drive and Pasturegate Avenue in Werrington Downs before heading into Werrington County and eventually onto Penrith.

== Facilities ==
The suburb has a neighbourhood centre and a preschool. The suburb is also known for its wide reserve areas which gives a lot of room for recreational activities. Werrington Downs is served by the shopping precinct at Werrington County along Dunheved Road.

== Governance ==
At a local government level, Werrington Downs is part of the north ward of Penrith City Council, represented by Ross Fowler (Mayor of Penrith). At the state level, it is part of the Electoral district of Londonderry, represented by Labor Party member Prue Car. Federally, it is part of the Division of Lindsay, represented by Liberal Party Melissa McIntosh.
