= Cambridge Park, New South Wales =

Cambridge Park
- Suburb
- Interactive map of Cambridge Park
- Coordinates: 33°44′54″S 150°44′4″E
- Country: Australia
- State: New South Wales
- City: Sydney
- LGA: City of Penrith
- Location: 53 km (33 mi) W of Sydney CBD
- Established: 1884

Government
  - State electorates: Londonderry; Penrith
  - Federal division: Lindsay

Area
  - Total: 2.63 km^{2} (1.02 sq mi)
- Elevation: 59 m (194 ft)

Population
  - Total: 7,054 (2021 census)
  - Density: 2,682/km^{2} (6,947/sq mi)
- Postcode: 2747
Suburbs around Cambridge Park
Cambridge Gardens	Werrington Downs	Werrington County
Penrith	Cambridge Park	Werrington County
Penrith	Kingswood	Werrington

Cambridge Park is a suburb of Sydney, in the state of New South Wales, Australia 53 kilometres west of the Sydney central business district, in the local government area of the City of Penrith. It is part of the Greater Western Sydney region.

== History ==
=== Aboriginal culture ===
Prior to European settlement, what is now Cambridge Park was home to the Mulgoa people who spoke the Darug language. They lived a hunter-gatherer lifestyle governed by traditional laws, which had their origins in the Dreamtime. Their homes were bark huts called "gunyahs". They hunted kangaroos and emus for meat, and gathered yams, berries and other native plants. Shortly after the arrival of the First Fleet in Australia in 1788, an outbreak of smallpox decimated the local indigenous communities.

=== European settlement ===
The first land grant in the area was made in 1831 to Phillip Parker King, son of the Governor Phillip Gidley King. He named it St Stephens although it later became part of the Werrington estate belonging to his sister Mary Lethbridge. It was run as a farm until the 1880s when the estate was subdivided into smaller farms, one of which became Cambridge Park. Development in the area began in the 1950s. Cambridge Park Post Office opened on 2 January 1953 and closed around 1995.

== Housing ==
Developed mainly in the 1950s, the streets are at right angles to each other, unlike the curving street patterns of the newer suburbs to the north, and the houses are mostly fibro on quarter acre blocks.

== Demographics ==
According to the 2021 census, there were 7,054 people in Cambridge Park.

- Aboriginal and Torres Strait Islander people made up 8.8% of the population.
- 76.4% of people were born in Australia. The next most common countries of birth were England 2.7% and New Zealand 2.0%.
- 80.7% of people spoke only English at home.
- The most common responses for religion were No Religion 37.2%, Catholic 22.2% and Anglican 14.5%.

== Governance ==
At a local government level, Cambridge Park is part of the north ward of Penrith City Council, represented by Lexie Cettolin, Kevin Crameri, Ross Fowler, Pat Sheehy (currently mayor of Penrith) and John Thain. At the state level, it is part of the Electoral district of Londonderry, represented by Labor's Prue Car. Federally, it is part of the Division of Lindsay, represented by Liberal Party Melissa McIntosh.

== Sport and recreation ==
In 1988, the Penrith Valley Regional Sports Centre was constructed in Cambridge Park. As of 2025, it was a six-court venue.
