= Marsden Park =

- Suburb
- Interactive map of Marsden Park
- Coordinates: 33°41′21″S 150°48′10″E
- Country: Australia
- State: New South Wales
- City: Greater Western Sydney
- LGA: City of Blacktown
- Location: 47 km (29 mi) NW of Sydney CBD

Government
  - State electorates: Londonderry; Riverstone
  - Federal division: Chifley

Area
  - Total: 13.68 km^{2} (5.28 sq mi)
- Elevation: 30 m (98 ft)

Population
  - Total: 14,610 (SAL 2021)
- Postcode: 2765
Suburbs around Marsden Park
Berkshire Park Melonba	Angus	Riverstone
Melonba Shanes Park	Marsden Park	Schofields
Shalvey	Bidwill; Hassall Grove	Colebee

Marsden Park is a suburb of Sydney, in the state of New South Wales, Australia. Marsden Park is located 47 kilometres (29 mi) north-west of the Sydney central business district, in the Blacktown local government area and is part of the Greater Western Sydney region.

The rapid development of Marsden Park, first rezoned in 2013, resulted in a steep increase in the suburb's population and heightened interest generated by residential development companies affiliated in the project. Nevertheless, the slow creation of adequate infrastructure and services such as shops, schools, roads, public transport and healthcare, mismatch the proportions for its large, growing population and number of dwellings within the suburb's boundaries. This has led Marsden Park to be seen as a prime example of urban sprawl within the western outskirts of Sydney.

The suburb name should not be confused with the park and surrounding housing estate with the same name Marsden Park, also known as 'Park Central' located in Campbelltown, in the Campbelltown local government area part of both the Macarthur region and South Western Sydney.

== History ==
The suburbs takes its name from Samuel Marsden (1764–1838), a Church of England priest and landowner in the area.

The suburb boundaries of Schofields and Marsden Park were altered in November 2020, resulting in the gazettal of new suburbs of Melonba and Angus in the west and north respectively.

== Heritage listings ==
Marsden Park has a number of heritage-listed sites, including:

- 1270 Richmond Road: Clydesdale

== Schools ==
- Marsden Park Public School, established in 1889.
- Australian Christian College, Marsden Park/Angus campus.
- St Luke's Catholic College (K-12), established in 2017.
- Northbourne Public School, established in 2021.
- Marsden Park Anglican College, established in 2024. (Note: Originally a campus of Richard Johnson Anglican College, from 2016 to 2023.)

== Transport ==
Marsden Park has 3 public transport lines linking it to other suburbs and railway stations.

The 748 bus runs from Melonba to Tallawong metro station via Schofields station, providing access to the Sydney Metro M1 Northwest & Bankstown Line, the T1 Richmond Line, and the T5 Cumberland Line.

The 747 bus from Rouse Hill metro station to Mount Druitt station passes through Marsden Park, Melonba, and Riverstone station to further accommodate access to the T1 Western line towards Emu Plains and Penrith, and further access to sparsely scheduled T1 services heading northbound to Richmond.

Additionally, the 751 bus running from Melonba to Blacktown station via Colebee provides residents direct access to both suburbs and Blue Mountains Line services running towards Central or Lithgow, Springwood, and Mount Victoria.

There are plans to connect the M1 Metro North West & Bankstown Line to the Sydney Metro Western Sydney Airport from Tallawong to St Marys station via Marsden Park. Furthermore, initial plans from the Strategic Town Centre reports from 2013 reveal a corridor for a possible railway station straddling South Street.

== Places of worship ==
- Baitul Huda Mosque is located on Hollinsworth Road.
- St Luke's Catholic Parish (Note: The parish is currently under construction, and services are in a temporary building.), located within St Luke's Catholic College.

== Amenities ==
The suburb includes a caravan park, a golf driving range, a Hamrun Maltese Club and a chicken farm. The suburb is currently being developed with new residential and commercial areas to accommodate residents. Sydney Business Park is a new commercial precinct in the suburb, adjacent to the Westlink M7 Motorway and Richmond Road. The site includes an IKEA store and Costco warehouse with a Costco Fuel Station, among many other retail businesses in the area.
