= Willmot, New South Wales =

Willmot
- Suburb
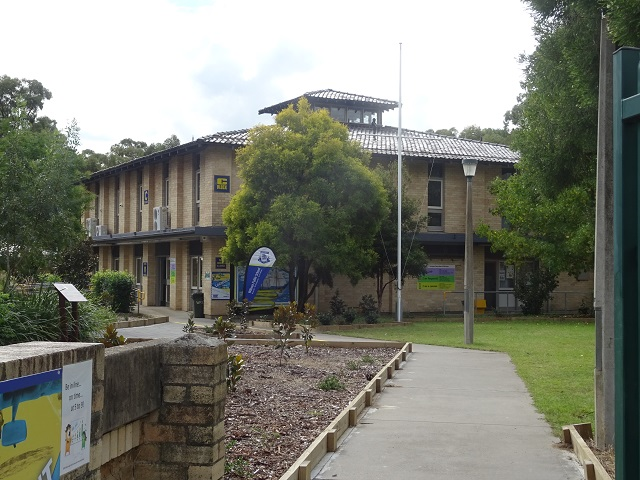
- Willmot Public School

- Interactive map of Willmot
- Coordinates: 33°43′31″S 150°47′33″E
- Country: Australia
- State: New South Wales
- City: Sydney
- LGA: City of Blacktown
- Location: 49 km (30 mi) west of Sydney CBD

Government
  - State electorate: Mount Druitt
  - Federal division: Chifley
- Elevation: 42 m (138 ft)

Population
  - Total: 2,382 (2021 census)
- Postcode: 2770
Suburbs around Willmot
| Shanes Park | Shanes Park | Shanes Park |
| Ropes Crossing | Willmot | Shalvey |
| Ropes Crossing | Ropes Crossing | Lethbridge Park |

Willmot is a suburb of Sydney, in the state of New South Wales, Australia 49 kilometres west of the Sydney central business district, in the local government area of the City of Blacktown and is part of the Greater Western Sydney region.

== History ==
Willmot takes its name from Thomas Willmot (1851–1938) who was elected the first President of the Blacktown Shire Council. He was the Shire President in 1906-1910 and again in 1912–1913. The housing development built here in 1971 was to be called St Johns but since a suburb in Sydney was already called St Johns Park, Willmot was chosen.
