= Shanes Park =

- Suburb
- Interactive map of Shanes Park
- Coordinates: 33°42′40″S 150°46′20″E
- Country: Australia
- State: New South Wales
- City: Sydney
- LGA: City of Blacktown
- Location: 54 km (34 mi) west of Sydney CBD

Government
  - State electorate: Londonderry
  - Federal division: Chifley
- Elevation: 34 m (112 ft)

Population
  - Total: 384 (2021 census)
- Postcode: 2747
Suburbs around Shanes Park
Llandilo	Melonba	Marsden Park
Llandilo	Shanes Park	Marsden Park
Ropes Crossing; St Marys	Willmot	Shalvey

Shanes Park is a suburb of Sydney, in the state of New South Wales, Australia. Shanes Park is located 54 kilometres west of the Sydney central business district, in the local government areas of the City of Blacktown and is part of the Greater Western Sydney region.

== History ==
The estate was granted to Surgeon John Harris on 18 December 1805. Although listed as 700 acres, it did in fact consist of 785 acres.

There are a couple of theories as to how Harris settled on the name 'Shanes Park' for his residence and estate. The first and most quoted is due to the fondness of his own name 'John". Without issue of his own he did virtually entail his estate by stipulating his heirs must be named "John Harris', and it was because of this fondness of the name that 'Shanes Park' was selected due to Shane being the Ulster variant of 'John'. This version has been published many times over the years but the first not being until many years after Harris' death.

Another and perhaps more likely reason is that from a young age John Harris would have been well acquainted with Shane's Castle, the family seat of the O'Neils of Clandeboy which is situated 16 miles to the east of Harris' native town of Magherafelt on the north east shore of Lough Neagh and lies midway between Magherafelt and the port towns of Carrickfergus and Belfast. It would have been a logical rest point with its village and inn. Shanes Castle estate was a picturesque spot of wooded forest on the shore of the Lake Neagh. similarly Shanes Park was an attractive wooded location on South creek.

There appear to be no photographs of the Shanes Park house, though it was probably closer in appearance to his Experiment Farm Cottage at Harris Park than his grand Ultimo residence.

Harris, who used a wheelchair, and his wife Eliza moved to Shanes Park full time from 1831 until their deaths in 1837 and 1838 respectively. The estate was able to support all types of farming practices and remained in the Harris family until 1929.

In 1960, the eastern portion of Shanes Park was purchased by the commonwealth government to house an air navigational facility. Substantial heritage from this facility remains to this day. As this required very little space, most areas of the site were retained as intact bushland, while other areas regenerated naturally. The 560 site known as 'Shanes Park' now comprises one of the largest remaining woodlands in the Cumberland Plain (western Sydney).

== Shanes Park woodland ==
The Shanes Park woodland is possibly the most intact remnant of the vegetation which once covered western Sydney, and contains a wide range of vulnerable, endangered and critically endangered flora, fauna and ecological communities. The site is particularly renowned for its woodland bird fauna, including the speckled warbler. The site is not open to public access.

On 26 September 2021, it was announced that the 500-hectare (1,200-acre) site at Shanes Park between Penrith and Windsor will be become a new National Park. On 22 February 2023, the national park was christened Yiraaldiya National Park. (Previously Shanes Park Reserve)

The prior owners, Air Services Australia (a Federal government entity), had considered the site surplus to their needs, and had proposed to hand over ownership as a public reserve to the New South Wales government. The Deed of Agreement for transfer required the NSW government to gazette the land as regional park. This requirement had caused conflict with some community organisations. The National Parks & Wildlife Act (s. 30 H) outlines the purpose of a regional park as being for recreation only, and does not expect management for wildlife conservation.
