= Cranebrook =

- Suburb
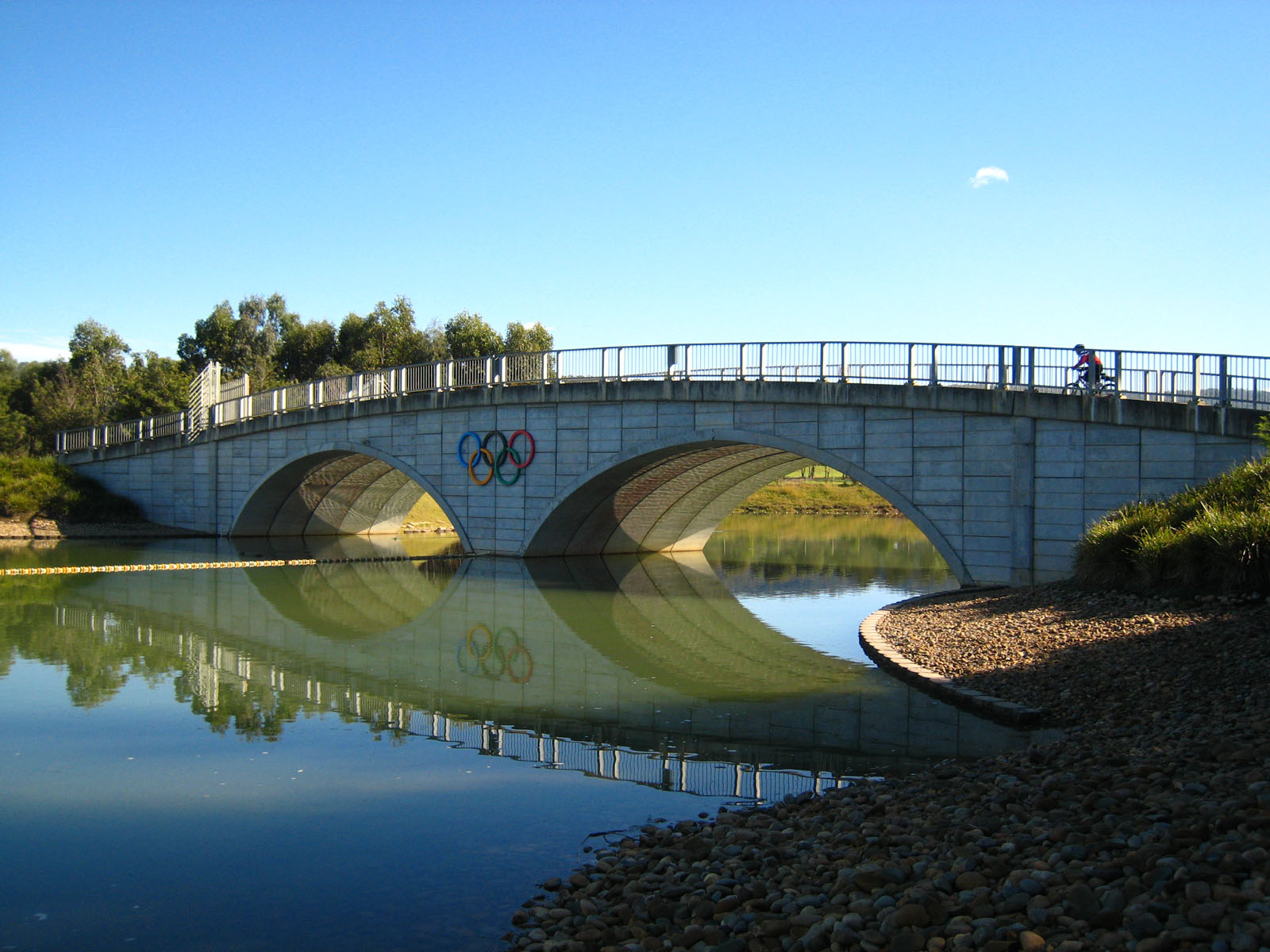
- Sydney International Regatta Centre

- Interactive map of Cranebrook
- Coordinates: 33°43′15″S 150°42′47″E
- Country: Australia
- State: New South Wales
- City: Sydney
- LGA: Penrith City Council
- Location: 65 km (40 mi) west of Sydney CBD
- Established: 1804

Government
  - State electorates: Penrith; Londonderry
  - Federal division: Lindsay
- Elevation: 40 m (130 ft)

Population
  - Total: 15,779 (2021 census)
- Postcode: 2749
Suburbs around Cranebrook
Castlereagh	Londonderry	Londonderry
Castlereagh	Cranebrook	Llandilo; Jordan Springs
Mount Riverview	Penrith	Cambridge Gardens

Cranebrook is a suburb of Greater Western Sydney, in the state of New South Wales, Australia, and is located 50 km radially (65 km by road) WNW of the Sydney central business district, in the local government area of the City of Penrith. Cranebrook is part of the Greater Western Sydney region.

Cranebrook is surrounded by the rural suburbs of Castlereagh, Llandilo and Londonderry and has come to incorporate the Mount Pleasant housing estate, long regarded as a separate suburb.

== History ==
Cranebrook takes its name from a pioneer farmer, James McCarthy, who was granted 100 acres (400,000 m^{2}) of land in 1804 and named it "Crane Brook farm", after the abundance of cranes in the area. James McCarthy started a cemetery in 1804. After his four-year-old daughter died, he set aside some land to bury her in what became one of the first Catholic cemeteries in Australia.

Cranebrook Post Office opened on 1 August 1886, closed in 1929, re-opened in 1934 and closed in 1957.

== Geography ==
Cranebrook's geography is hilly and many residents on the western side enjoy views across the Nepean River to the Blue Mountains. Residents on the eastern side enjoy views across the ADI Site, an area rich in Cumberland Woodland and populated with many kangaroos.

The Northern Road separates Cranebrook (to the west) from the ADI Site (to the east), an area of land around 15 square kilometres in size. Aspects relating to the sale and development of this land have been a strong local political issue. The southern boundary of Cranebrook is Andrews Road, and the northern boundary is Smeeton Road. Nearby is McCarthys Lane Cemetery, considered the oldest Catholic cemetery in Australia. The western boundary is Castlereagh Road and Church Street.

=== Penrith Lakes ===
West of Castlereagh Rd are the Penrith Lakes, a series of flooded quarries. The quarries were formed by a quarrying conglomerate in 1979. The site supplies around 75% of Sydney's sand and crushed aggregate requirements, including about 85% of the materials for ready mixed concrete. One of these lakes is the Sydney International Regatta Centre which hosted the rowing events of the Sydney 2000 Olympics. There is also the popular Penrith Whitewater Stadium which hosted whitewater slalom events for the Sydney 2000 Olympics. The Penrith Lakes Development Corporation (PLDC) oversees implementation of the Penrith Lakes Scheme.

It is a popular misconception that these lakes are filled via the Nepean River but they are actually filled via rain water and ground water. When the Nepean River floods, the lakes system can act as a weir. A Penrith Lakes Scheme Concept Plan is currently under review to ensure the site delivers a wide range of environmental, social, cultural and economic values. PLDC has established a community advisory committee (CAC) which will meet regularly and provide advice on the ongoing planning and development of the lakes scheme.

The lakes were also a film location for the film Mad Max: Fury Road (2015).

== Demographics ==
According to the 2021 census of Population, there were 15,779 people in Cranebrook.

- Aboriginal and Torres Strait Islander people made up 7.0% of the population.
- The median age of people in Cranebrook was 33, younger than the national median of 38.
- 80.4% of people were born in Australia. The next most common countries of birth were England 3.1%, New Zealand 1.6%, India 1.0%, Philippines 0.9% and China 0.6%.
- 85.5% of people only spoke English at home. Other languages spoken at home included Arabic 0.7%, Mandarin 0.6%, Spanish 0.6%, Maltese 0.5% and Tagalog 0.5%.
- The most common responses for religion were No Religion 35.5%, Catholic 28.6% and Anglican 15.0%.

== Commercial area ==
The main commercial area of Cranebrook is on Borrowdale Way, and features a shopping centre and some parkland.

== Transport ==
Residents of Cranebrook can access Penrith by travelling south on The Northern Road or Castlereagh Road. The trip by car is about 10 minutes. Residents can also travel to Windsor and Richmond to the north, which are about 10–15 minutes by car. The distance to the Sydney CBD is 65 km and this is best travelled by either driving down The Northern Road to the M4 Motorway or taking a train from Penrith Railway Station. Cranebrook itself has no train station (the nearest station is Penrith); however, the area is serviced by buses which can take residents into Penrith.

== Schools ==
The three public primary schools are Braddock Public School, Henry Fulton Public School and Samuel Terry Public School. The local public high school is Cranebrook High School. At one point Xavier College was based in Cranebrook, while construction of its permanent site in Llandilo was developed.

The Catholic primary school is Corpus Christi, located in northern Cranebrook. A non-denominational Christian private school, St Paul's Grammar School, offers the IB Diploma Programme.

== Churches ==
There are three churches in Cranebrook: Corpus Christi Catholic Church on Andromeda Drive and St Thomas's Anglican Church on Callisto Drive and open door community of Christ on laycock street.

== Housing ==
Cranebrook is a largely residential area. It contains mostly medium-density housing and some low-density semi-rural housing towards the north. Whilst some of the semi-rural areas would date to when Cranebrook was first founded, much of the medium-density development has occurred within just the last 15 years. Even today there is a regular new home construction.

As such, the population is typically local families, many of whom are home-owners or aspiring home-owners. There are some units and semi-detached houses in the Mount Pleasant area, though the majority are detached with good size house blocks, well kept gardens and abundant mature native trees.

In 2010, the swamplands in the south-western corner of Cranebrook were developed into a 53.3ha housing community named Waterside. The development includes 694 high-density dwellings, lakes and parklands.

Shortly after the Waterside development completed, a new development east of Cranebrook was established. Jordan Springs is located in 229ha of former Australian Defence Industry land and shares a boundary with Cranebrook via The Northern Road.

== Politics ==
The state government electorates are Londonderry and Penrith. It is in the North Ward of the local government area of the City of Penrith. The Aboriginal district is the Deerubbin Local Aboriginal Land Council Area.
