= Londonderry, New South Wales =

Londonderry
- Suburb
- Interactive map of Londonderry
- Coordinates: 33°38′55″S 150°44′8″E
- Country: Australia
- State: New South Wales
- City: Sydney
- LGA: City of Penrith
- Location: 60 km (37 mi) north-west of Sydney CBD

Government
  - State electorate: Londonderry
  - Federal division: Lindsay
- Elevation: 23 m (75 ft)

Population
  - Total: 4,024 (2021 census)
- Postcode: 2753
Suburbs around Londonderry
Agnes Banks	Richmond	Bligh Park
Agnes Banks	Londonderry	Berkshire Park
Castlereagh	Cranebrook	Llandilo

Londonderry is a suburb of Greater Western Sydney, in the state of New South Wales, Australia. It is 60 kilometres north-west of the Sydney central business district, in the local government area of the City of Penrith.

== History ==
Londonderry takes its name from the 1831 grant of 12 hectares (30 acres) to Thomas Kendell.

Its post office opened on 1 February 1935, run by Robert Ernest Nutt, who also ran the attached store, and later became mayor of Castlereagh.

== Heritage listings ==
Londonderry has a number of heritage-listed sites, including:

- 947-953 Londonderry Road: Fossil and Petrology collections, New South Wales

== Population ==
At the 2021 census, there were 4,024 people in Londonderry.

- Aboriginal and Torres Strait Islander people made up 4.4% of the population.
- 79.7% of people were born in Australia. The next most common country of birth was England (2.5%).
- 81.9% of people spoke only English at home. Other languages spoken at home included Maltese (3.9%).
- The most common responses for religion were Catholic 37.5%, No Religion 27.4% and Anglican 15.9%.

== Geography ==
Londonderry is located in the northernmost part of the City of Penrith with the Driftway forming the boundary with the Hawkesbury City Council area. The Northern Road divides Londonderry from Berkshire Park while Cranebrook and Agnes Banks are its boundaries on its southern and western sides. Londonderry is a rural area and much of it still crown land. Because of its closeness to Richmond and distance from Penrith, the suburb has always had stronger links with Richmond than with Penrith.

== Commercial area ==
Londonderry village in the centre of the suburb is a vital community connection point for local residents in the area. Amenities include shops, cafes, service stations, a post office, a community hall and neighbourhood centre, Londonderry Public School and the Londonderry Rural Fire Brigade station.

== Sports and Recreation ==
Londonderry Park in the town centre is the home of the Londonderry Greys Rugby League Football Club which participates in the Penrith Junior Rugby League competition and the Londonderry Netball Club. The Richmond Race Club on Londonderry Road, Londonderry is a major greyhound racing facility and a number of greyhound trainers and owners reside locally. The Londonderry Pony Club has its grounds also on Londonderry Road in Londonderry.
