= Berkshire Park =

- Suburb
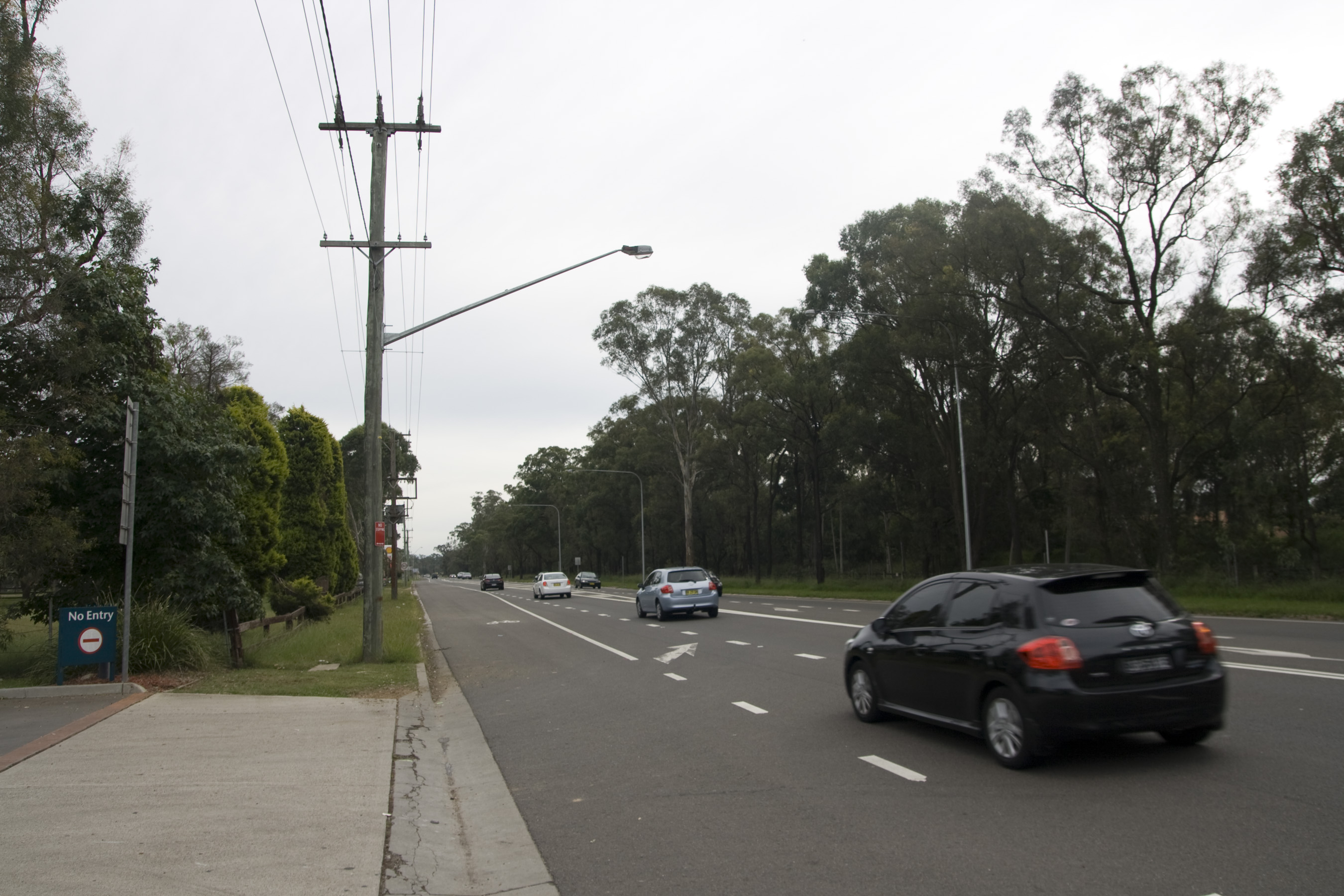
- Richmond Road in Berkshire Park

- Interactive map of Berkshire Park
- Country: Australia
- State: New South Wales
- City: Sydney
- LGA: City of Penrith
- Location: 55 km (34 mi) NW of Sydney

Government
  - State electorate: Londonderry
  - Federal division: Lindsay
- Elevation: 30 m (98 ft)

Population
  - Total: 2,149 (2021 census)
- Postcode: 2765
Suburbs around Berkshire Park
| Richmond | South Windsor | Bligh Park |
| Londonderry | Berkshire Park | Windsor Downs |
| Llandilo | Shanes Park | Marsden Park |

Berkshire Park is a suburb of Sydney, in the state of New South Wales, Australia. It covers 19.3 square kilometres (7.5 sq mi) within the local government area of City of Penrith. The suburb has a diverse range of activity, including a pet cemetery, correctional facility, nature reserve, waste management centre and a racehorse education centre.

== Origin of name ==
The suburb's name is believed to have come from the English county of Berkshire. The land was given to Richard Rouse as a land grant in 1838. Rouse may have chosen this name because he had been married in North Hinksey, which was then part of Berkshire.

Berkshire Park Post Office opened on 1 May 1936 and closed in 1961.

== Community services ==
There is a large recreational area located on 6th Rd, Berkshire Park. Part of this area is a reserve for public use, with seating areas and a children's playground. There is also a public hall and the station of the Berkshire Park Rural Fire Brigade, a brigade of the NSW Rural Fire Service.

== Heat record ==
On 4 January 2020, a heat logger registered a temperature of 52.0 °C (125.6 °F) in the suburb, making it the hottest temperature ever registered in the Sydney basin, albeit being an unofficial record.

== Demographics ==
According to the 2021 census, there were 2,149 people in Berkshire Park.

- Aboriginal and Torres Strait Islander people made up 14.7% of the population.
- 74.5% of people were born in Australia and 37.0% of people only spoke English at home.

== Transport ==
At approximately 55 km from the centre of Sydney, it is in a somewhat isolated area. The closest train stations are Windsor and Riverstone.
