= Caddens =

- Suburb
- Interactive map of Caddens
- Country: Australia
- State: New South Wales
- City: Sydney
- LGA: Penrith City Council
- Location: 48 km (30 mi) W of Sydney CBD

Government
  - State electorate: Londonderry
  - Federal division: Lindsay
- Elevation: 71 m (233 ft)

Population
  - Total: 3,487 (2021 census)
- Postcode: 2747
- Gazetted: 2012
Suburbs around Caddens
Kingswood	Kingswood	Claremont Meadows
Kingswood	Caddens	Claremont Meadows
Orchard Hills	Orchard Hills	Claremont Meadows

Caddens is a suburb of Sydney, in the state of New South Wales in Australia. It is a new masterplanned residential neighborhood located 49 kilometres (30 mi) west of the Sydney central business district, in the local government area of the City of Penrith featuring views of the scenic Blue Mountains. The suburb's postcode is 2747.

The suburb is bounded by: Western Sydney University Penrith Campus to the north, Claremont Meadows to the east, Orchard Hills at Caddens Road to the south, and Kingswood to the west.

== History ==
Caddens was named after Thomas John Fuller Cadden, a prominent business entrepreneur and pioneer of major development in the Penrith area. Caddens was officially designated as a separate suburb on 30 March 2012. Caddens was previously part of the neighboring suburb of Kingswood. As at the 2021 census the population of Caddens is 3,487.

== Housing ==
The first housing developments were completed in 2013. Prior to this, the land was used predominantly for farming.

== Education ==
Caddens is very close to Western Sydney University Penrith Campus, which lies outside the northern boundary of the suburb. It also falls within the high school catchment area of Kingswood High School. The suburb also lies within three public schools' catchment areas.

== Hospitals ==
Hospitals nearby include the Nepean Hospital, Nepean Private Hospital, Mount Druitt Hospital and Blacktown Hospital.

== Shopping ==
Caddens Corner Shopping Centre on O'Connell Street is now open. Shopping centres in surrounding suburbs include Southland Shopping Centre Penrith, Nepean Village, Westfield Penrith, St Marys Village Shopping Centre and Station Plaza in St Marys.

== Churches ==
The Penrith Baptist Church, built in 2014, is located in Caddens on Caddens Road. Many other churches and places of worship are found in nearby suburbs.

== Parks ==
Large amounts of land are currently and planned to be occupied by green spaces. The Roger Nethercote Park and Hilltop Park are some more prominent green areas.

== Transport ==
=== Road ===
The suburb is situated very close to the M4 Motorway and the Great Western Highway.

=== Bus ===
Caddens is serviced by two bus routes that are operated by Busways: the 774 bus service between Mount Druitt and Penrith and the 781 bus to Penrith via Glenmore Park, and St Marys via Claremont Meadows.

=== Rail ===
Kingswood and Werrington railway stations are the closest with direct connections to the Sydney CBD, Penrith, Blacktown and Parramatta. Alternatively, residents can catch the local bus services that connect to St Marys railway station.
