= Ropes Creek railway station =

Former railway station in Sydney, Australia

Ropes Creek
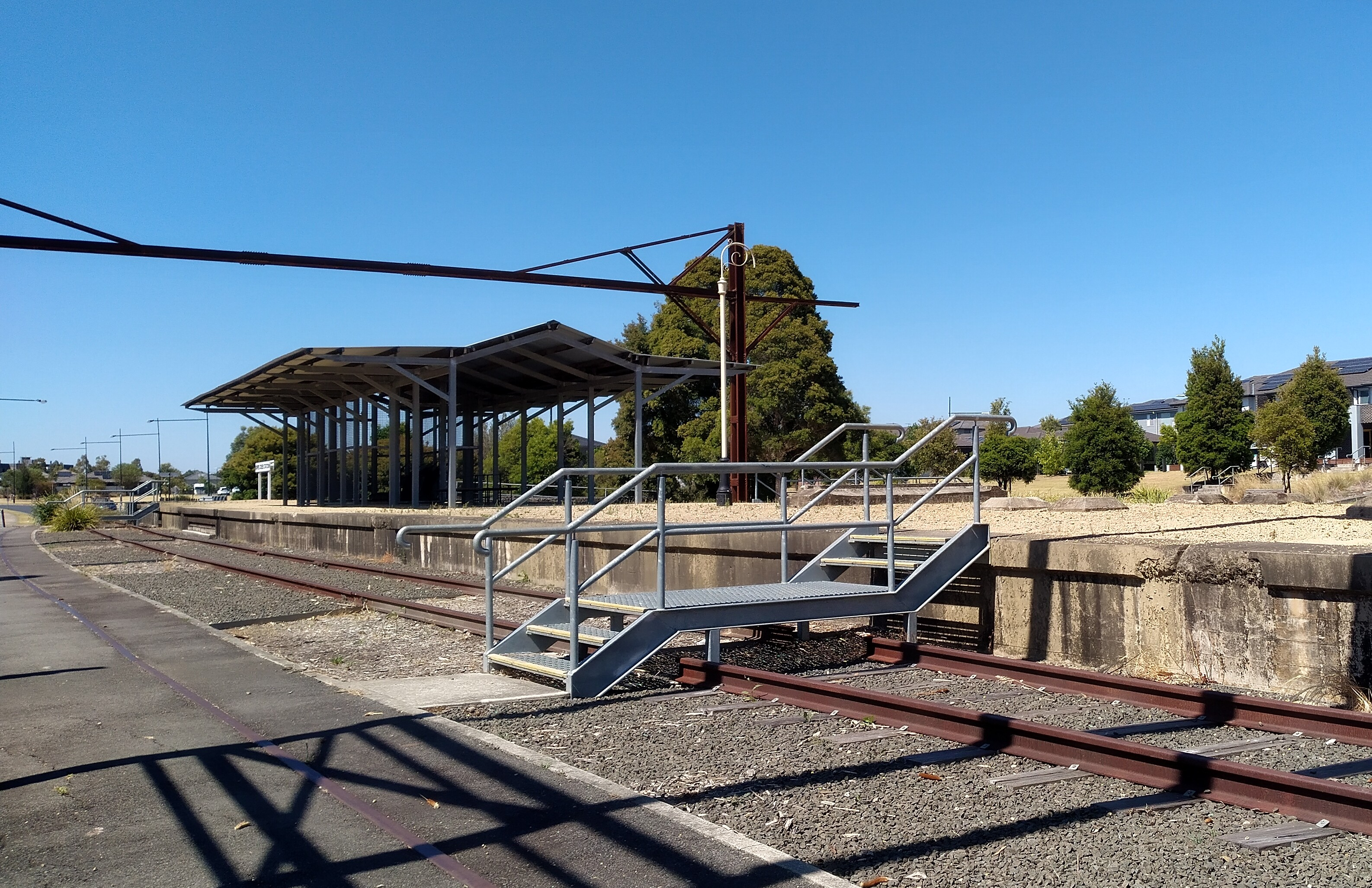
- The park with the preserved remains of the station, December 2022

General information
- Location: Beston Drive, Ropes Creek; Australia
- Coordinates: 33°43′40″S 150°46′51″E
- Operator: State Rail Authority
- Line: Ropes Creek
- Distance: 53.010 kilometres (32.939 mi) from Central
- Platforms: 2 (1 island)
- Tracks: 4

Construction
- Structure type: Ground

Other information
- Status: Reused

History
- Opened: 29 June 1942
- Closed: 22 March 1986

Services
Preceding station	Former services	Following station
Terminus	Ropes Creek Line	Cochrane towards St Marys
Location

Ropes Creek railway station was a railway station on the Ropes Creek line, serving the then-industrial suburb of Ropes Crossing in Sydney, New South Wales. It was opened on 29 June 1942, after the line was extended past Dunheved to serve the St Marys Munitions factory, and was named after Ropes Creek, a waterway nearby. The station was the terminus of the line, and consisted of an island platform, a waiting room, and a footbridge for public access. It closed along with the line on 22 March 1986.

After the station building was destroyed by fire in June 2011, the site was redeveloped as a cultural park with the platform retained.
