= Werrington Lake =

Lake in New South Wales, Australia

Coordinates: 33.7536491°S 150.7390541°E

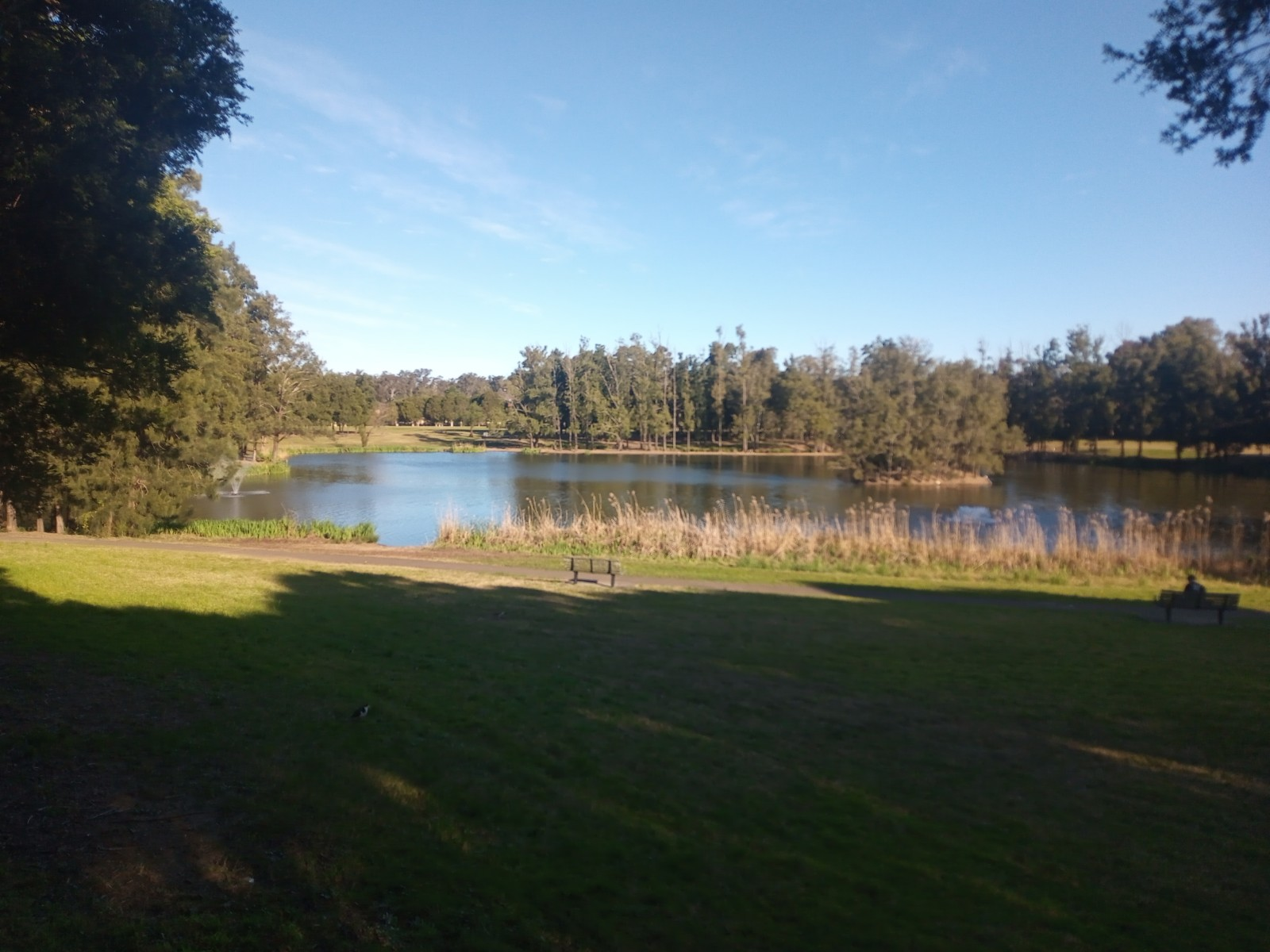
Werrington Lake - 2022

Werrington Lake in Werrington, New South Wales, Australia, is a man made lake, developed in the early 1980s as a solution to help relieve flooding of the Werrington Creek. It is located within Werrington Lake Reserve on the border between the suburbs of Werrington and Werrington County.

Removal of earth began in 1981 and was used to create the overpass of the railway line to the east of Werrington railway station. Lakes construction began in 1982 with Stage One costing approximately $225,000. An additional three stages followed this, beginning in 1984. The cost of these stages exceeded $500,000. Penrith City Council constructed walkways, bridges, wharves, playgrounds and landscaping. Werrington Lakes are a haven for students undertaking wetland and water conservation studies. It has also become a recreational area for picnickers and sports enthusiasts. The area has naturally attracted a great variety of native birdlife.

Used as a wetland to filter stormwater, before entering Werrington Creek, the lake is also used for irrigation for the cricket ground to the west and surrounding parklands.

In 2001, Penrith City Council, Department of Land & Water Conservation and the Werrington Landcare group created a program to bring the area back to life and to remediate many of the problems that had occurred in the area. In 2005, 300 bass, carp, mullet and eels were found dead in the lake. It is believed Chlorpyrifos, a widely used insecticide, was a contributing factor.

== Gallery ==
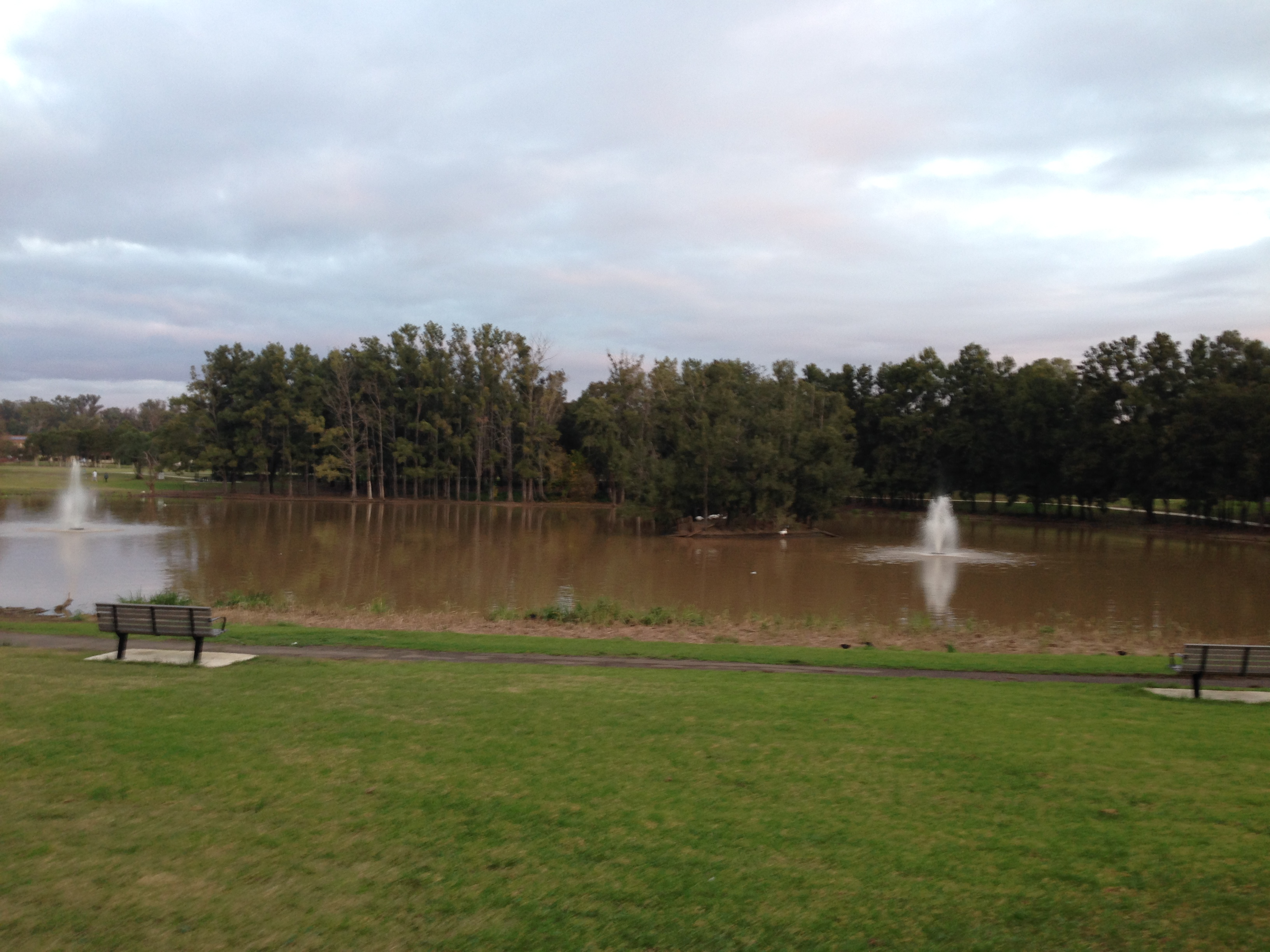
Werrington Lake 2015

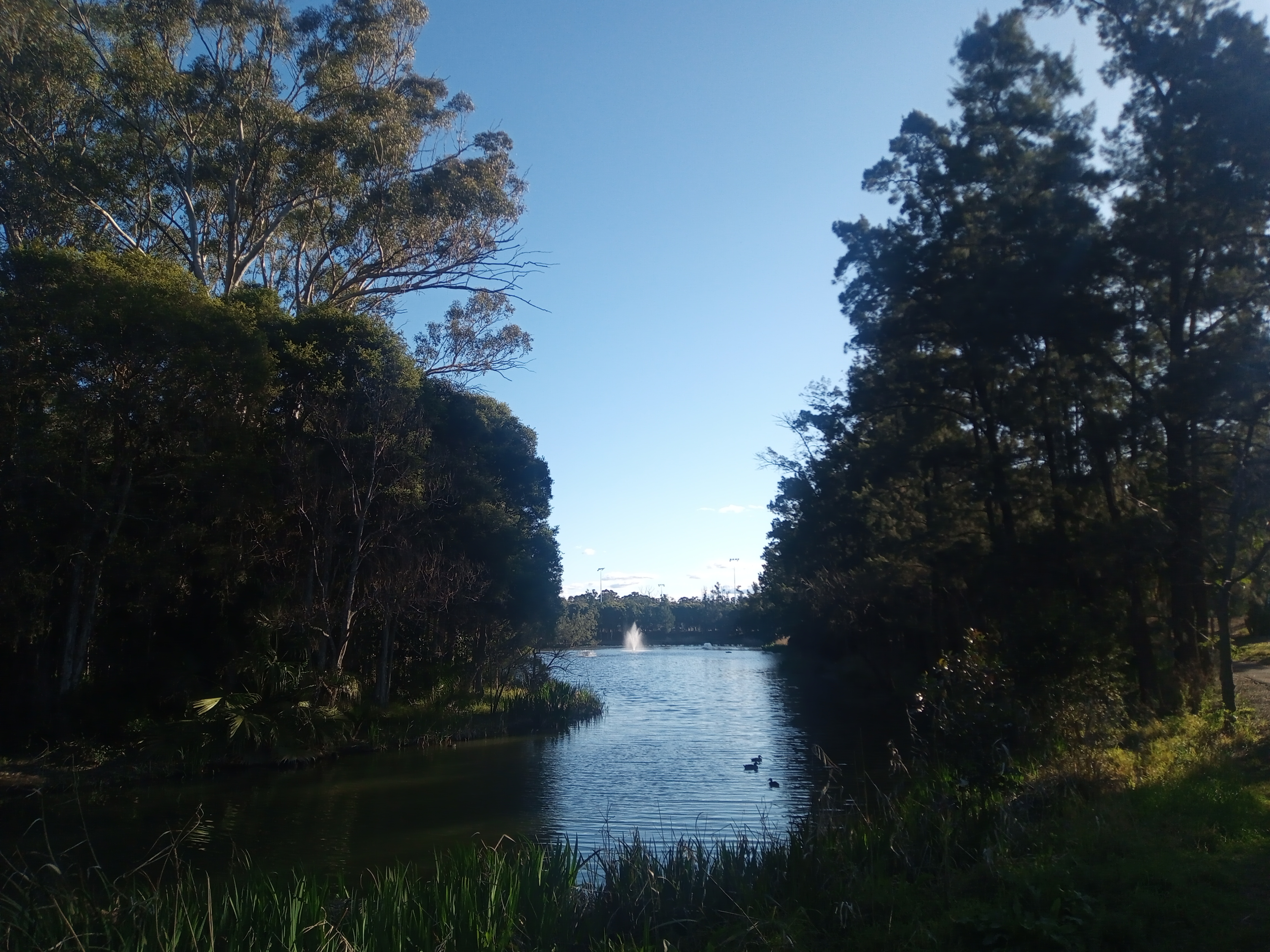
Werrington lake 2022

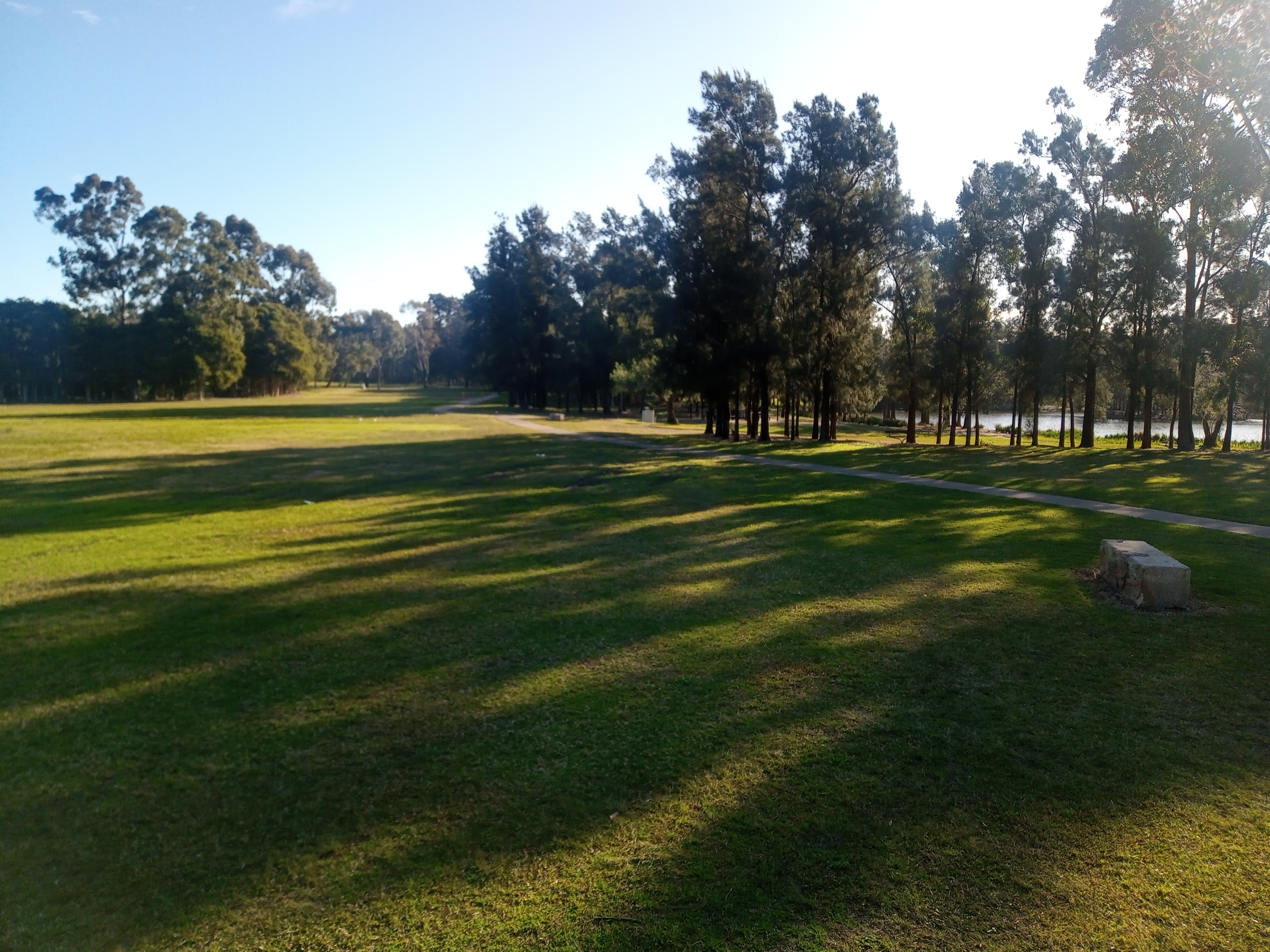
Werrington lake reserve 2022

Werrington lake reserve 2023

Werrington creek following rain - Werrington Lake reserve 2022
