= Cochrane railway station, Sydney =

Former railway station in Sydney, Australia

Cochrane

General information
- Location: Ropes Crossing; Australia
- Coordinates: 33°43′55″S 150°46′48″E
- Operator: State Rail Authority
- Line: Ropes Creek Line
- Distance: 52.480 kilometres (32.610 mi) from Central
- Platforms: 2 (2 side)
- Tracks: 2

Other information
- Status: Closed

History
- Opened: 2 September 1957
- Closed: 22 March 1986

Former services
Preceding station	Former services	Following station
Ropes Creek Terminus	Ropes Creek Line	Dunheved towards St Marys
Location

Cochrane railway station was a railway station on the Ropes Creek railway line serving the suburb of Ropes Crossing, Sydney, New South Wales.

== History ==
The station was built because of increased passenger numbers and increased production at the St. Marys Munitions Works site along with the arrival of electrification in 1957. The station itself was classed as unattended because most of the workers using the station had weekly tickets or return tickets, making ticket selling facilities unnecessary. The station was located on a slight right-hand bend (towards Ropes Creek) and straightened out towards the middle. An overhead road bridge ran over the station; the waiting room was built underneath the bridge. The station was about 165 metres long and could accommodate an eight-car suburban train.
