= Dunheved railway station =

Former railway station in Sydney, Australia

Dunheved
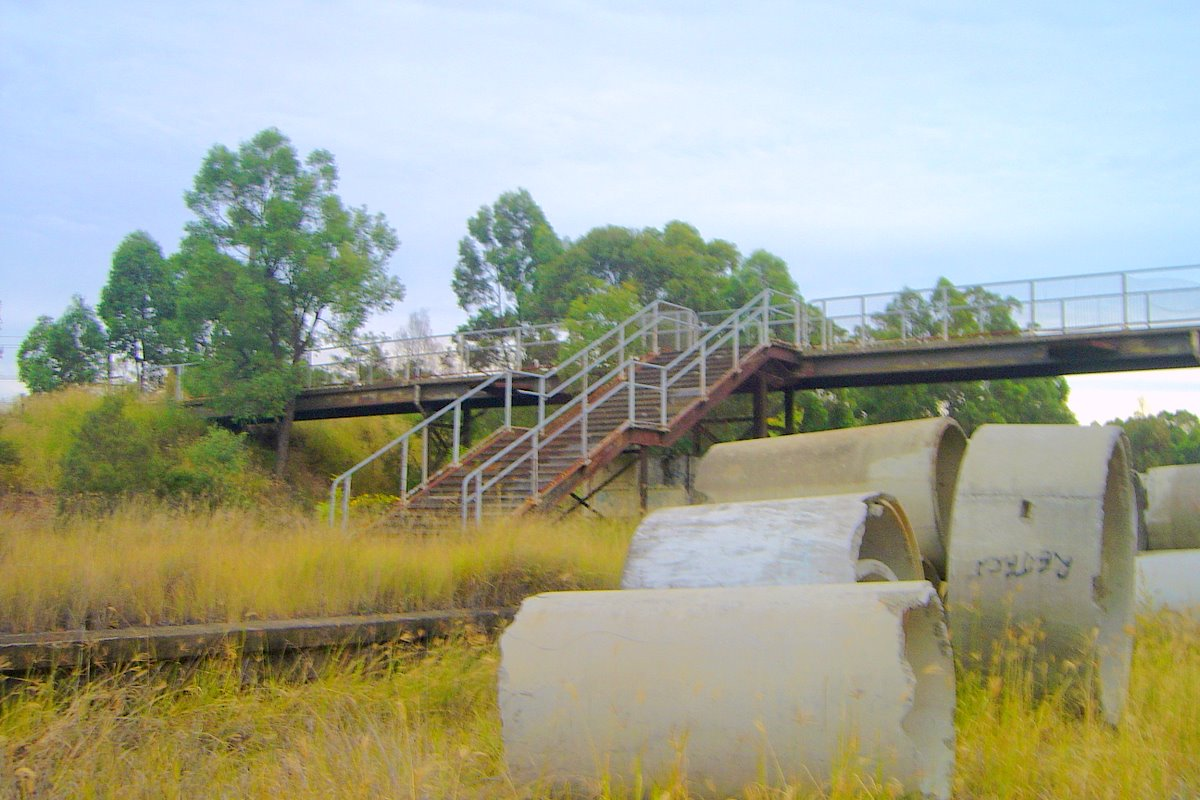
- The station remains in 2006

General information
- Location: Dunheved Circuit, St Marys; Australia
- Coordinates: 33°44′48″S 150°46′17″E
- Elevation: 32 metres (105 ft)
- Line: Ropes Creek
- Distance: 50.350 kilometres (31.286 mi) from Central
- Platforms: 2 (1 island)
- Tracks: 6

Construction
- Structure type: Ground

Other information
- Status: Closed

History
- Opened: 1 March 1942
- Closed: 22 March 1986

Former services
Preceding station	Former services	Following station
Cochrane towards Ropes Creek	Ropes Creek Line	St Marys Terminus
Location

Dunheved railway station was a suburban railway station located on the Ropes Creek railway line, serving the Sydney locality of Dunheved in St Marys. It was the only station on the line named after the locality it was situated in.

== Description ==
It consisted of an island platform which was set into a cutting and public access was via a footbridge and steps. The station's building was constructed from prefabricated concrete, consisted of a Station Masters office with a signal box and booking office, a waiting room, male & female toilets. The platform was 165 metres long or long enough to hold an 8 car Sydney suburban train. Points within Dunheved yard limits were operated by levers in the Station Masters Office as were the signals. Most of the yard signals were lower quadrant signals as well as ground or "dolly" signals, lighting to the lower quadrant signals was both electric and kerosene lamps. Mainline signals were Sydney suburban double light 2 aspects type and the line was track circuited through Dunheved.

== St Marys Munitions Works branchline ==
The line to St Marys Munitions Works was never electrified and headed from the yard in a western direction and turned north west just after the junction and headed around past some bush land to Dunheved Golf Course & paralleled Links Rd. After following the road for about 550 metres the line crosses the road and goes into Commonwealth Land, this is restricted land. About 80 metres after the road crossing, the line crosses South Creek, now known as Wianamatta Creek. Just after the line crosses the creek, it junctions into 3 tracks, the munitions works line still proceeds in a north west direction while the 2 new track head towards 2 buildings. They go through both buildings and end up rejoining the munitions works line about 1 kilometre after the buildings. About 3 kilometres after the junction of the sidings, the line turns to head in a more westerly direction to St Marys Munitions works. Points or turnouts within the munitions works were either spring-loaded points or throw over ball points. In 1943 the New South Wales Government Railways put a request in for 12 diesel electric locomotives, only four (4) General Electric 44 ton locos were available, these were ex United States Army Transportation Corps. The locomotives kept their US Army numbers 7920 to 7923 and were to be used at the St Marys Munitions Works but only one was required at the munitions works so the other 3 found use around Sydney.
