= KWD (disambiguation) =

KWD may refer to:

- Kaiserliche Werft Danzig, German shipbuilding company (1852–1918)
- Kellwood Company, American apparel manufacturer; NYSE ticker symbol: KWD
- Kingswood railway station, Sydney, Australia; station code: KWD
- Kirkwood railway station, Scotland; station code KWD
- Kuwaiti dinar, the currency of Kuwait; ISO 4217 code: KWD
- Kwaio language of the Solomon Islands; ISO 639-3 code: kwd
