= Mount Druitt railway station =

Railway station in Sydney, New South Wales, Australia

Mount Druitt
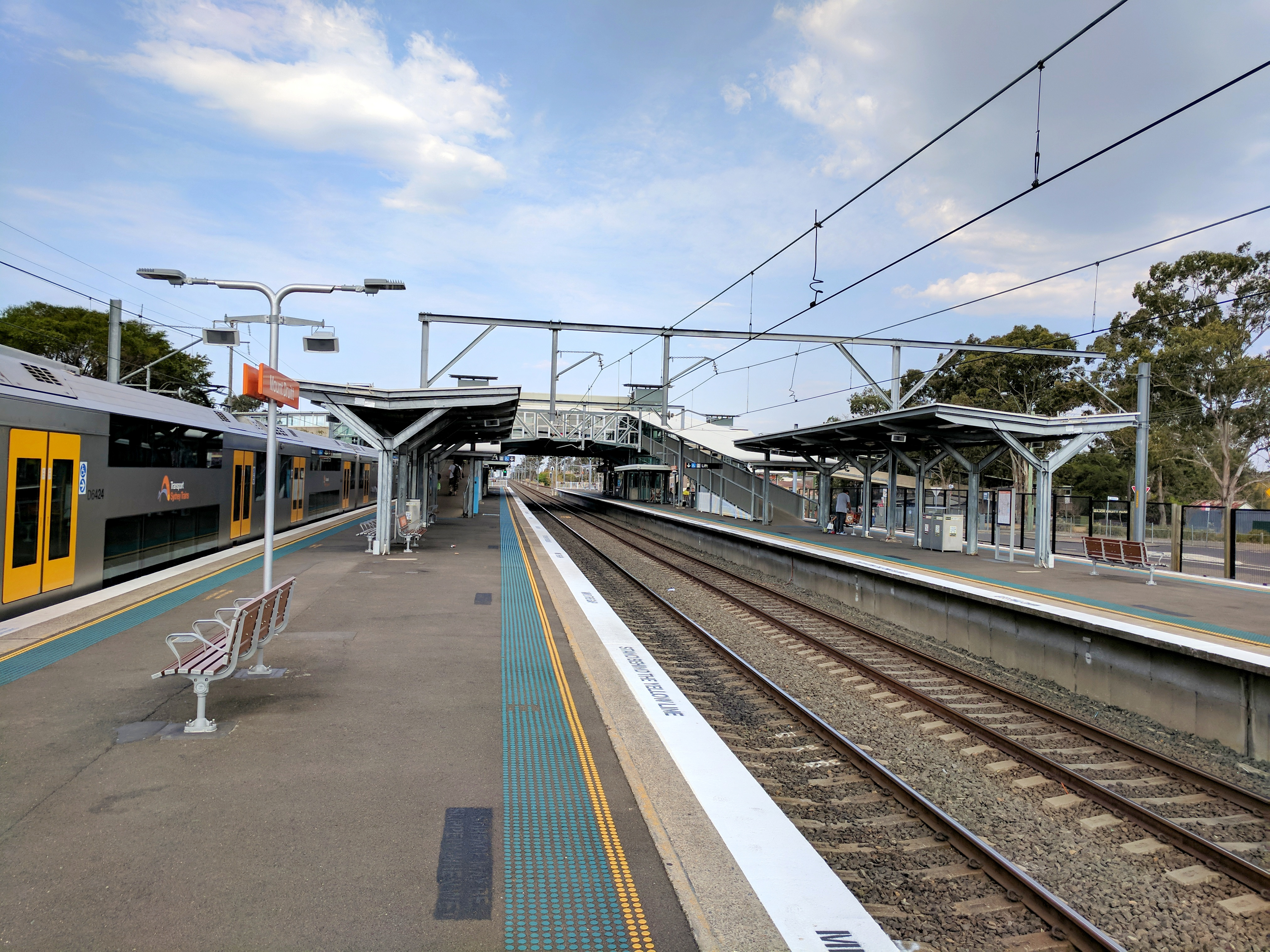
- Eastbound view from Platform 2 in September 2017

General information
- Location: North Parade, Mount Druitt; Sydney, New South Wales; Australia
- Coordinates: 33°46′11″S 150°49′11″E
- Elevation: 54 metres (177 ft)
- Owner: Transport Asset Manager of NSW
- Operator: Sydney Trains
- Line: Main Western
- Distance: 43.29 km (26.90 mi) from Central
- Platforms: 4 (2 island)
- Tracks: 4
- Connections: Bus

Construction
- Structure type: Ground
- Accessible: Yes

Other information
- Status: Staffed
- Station code: MTT
- Website: Transport for NSW

History
- Opened: 19 August 1881 (145 years ago)
- Rebuilt: 8 December 1974 (51 years ago)
- Electrified: Yes (from October 1955)

Passengers
- 2025: 3,186,130 (year); 8,729 (daily) (Sydney Trains)
- Rank: 53

Services
Preceding station	Sydney Trains	Following station
St Marys towards Emu Plains	North Shore & Western Line	Rooty Hill towards Berowra
Location

Mount Druitt railway station is a suburban railway station located on the Main Western line, serving the Sydney suburb of Mount Druitt. It is served by Sydney Trains T1 Western line services.

== History ==
The original Mount Druitt station opened on 19 August 1881. On 8 December 1974, a new station opened 500 metres to the east built, partly funded by the developer of the Westfield Shopping Centre.

In December 2003, an upgrade to the station including lifts was complete.

On 7 April 2016, a brawl broke out between two large groups of people at Mount Druitt station. Police say over 100 people were involved, 17 of whom were charged.

== Services ==
=== Platforms ===
Platform	Line	Stopping pattern	Notes
1	North Shore & Western Line	services to North Sydney, Gordon, Hornsby & Berowra via Central & Chatswood	
2	North Shore & Western Line	services to Gordon, Hornsby & Berowra via Central & Chatswood	Mainly used during peak hours
3	North Shore & Western Line	services to Penrith & Emu Plains	Mainly used during peak hours
4	North Shore & Western Line	services to Penrith & Emu Plains	

=== Transport links ===
Mount Druitt Station Bus Interchange

Stand 1: Busways

- 756: to Blacktown via Powers Road and Doonside

Stand 2: Busways

- 755: to Shalvey, extends to Plumpton during off-peak hours and on Saturdays
- 758: to St Marys via Shalvey and North St Marys

Stand 3: Busways

- 754: to Blacktown via Hassall Grove

Stand 4: Busways

- 750: to Blacktown via Carlisle Avenue and Richmond Road
- 761: to Bidwill via Carlisle Avenue

Stand 5: Busways

- 723: to Mount Druitt via Eastern Creek
- 728: to Blacktown via Rooty Hill and Bungarribee
- 729: to Blacktown via Minchinbury and Eastern Creek
- 738: to Eastern Creek Industrial Park and Horsley Park
- 739V: to Mount Druitt Village loop

Stand 6: Busways

- 780: to Penrith via Whalan, Tregear, Ropes Crossing, Werrington County and Cambridge Park

Stand 7: Busways

- 674: to Windsor via Whalan, Tregear, Shanes Park, Berkshire Park and South Windsor
- 759: to St Marys via Emerton, Lethbridge Park, Tregear, Willmot, Ropes Crossing and North St Marys

Stand 8: Busways

- 770: to Penrith via Colyton, St Marys, Claremont Meadows and Kingswood
- 771: to St Marys via Colyton.
- 774: to Penrith via Oxley Park, St Marys, UWS Kingswood and Nepean Hospital
- 775: to Penrith via St Marys, UWS Kingswood and Nepean Hospital
- 776: to Penrith via St Clair, UWS Kingswood and Nepean Hospital

Mount Druitt station is served by one NightRide route:

- N70: Penrith station to Town Hall station

== Gallery ==
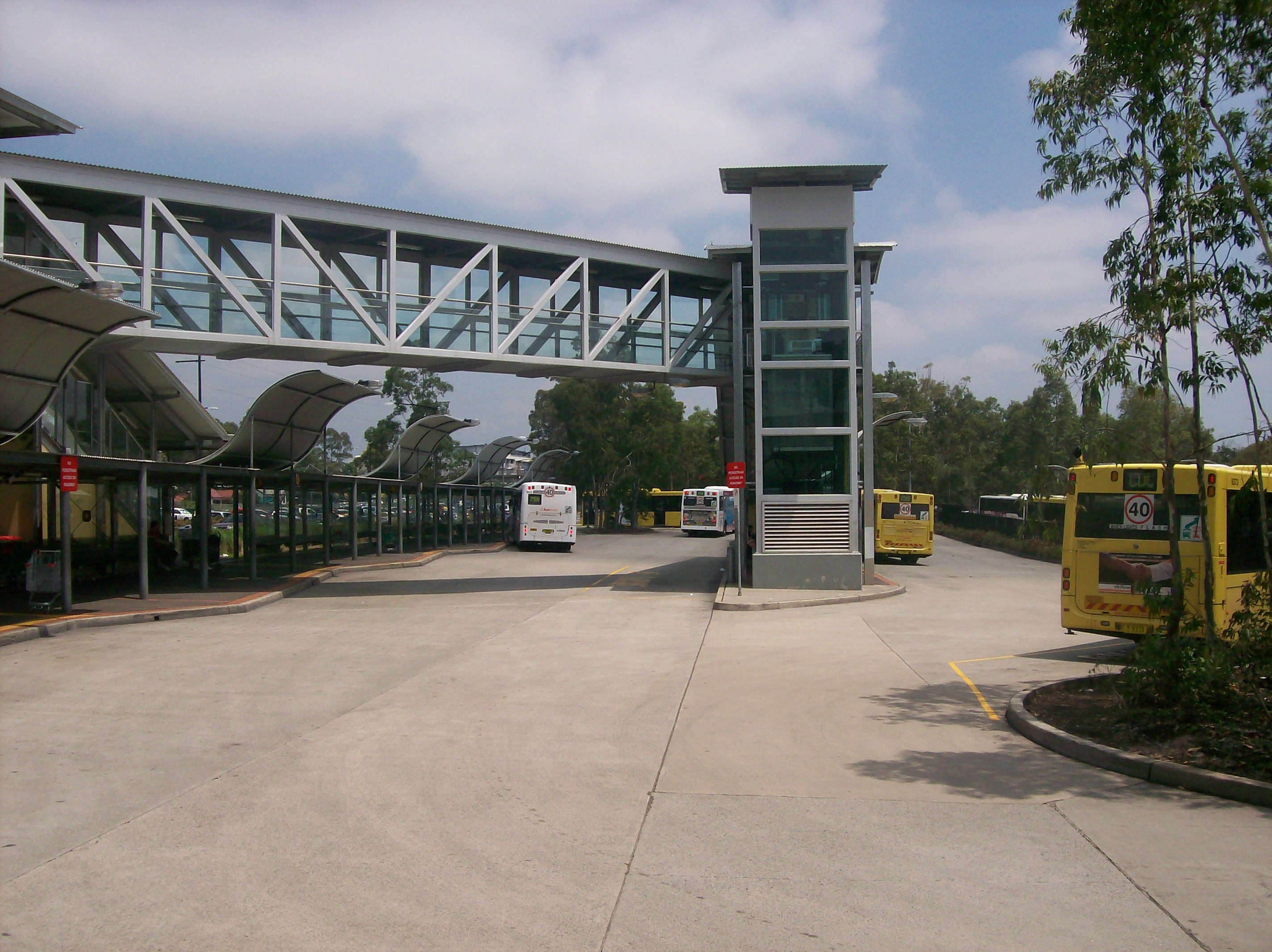
Interchange bus bay in November 2011

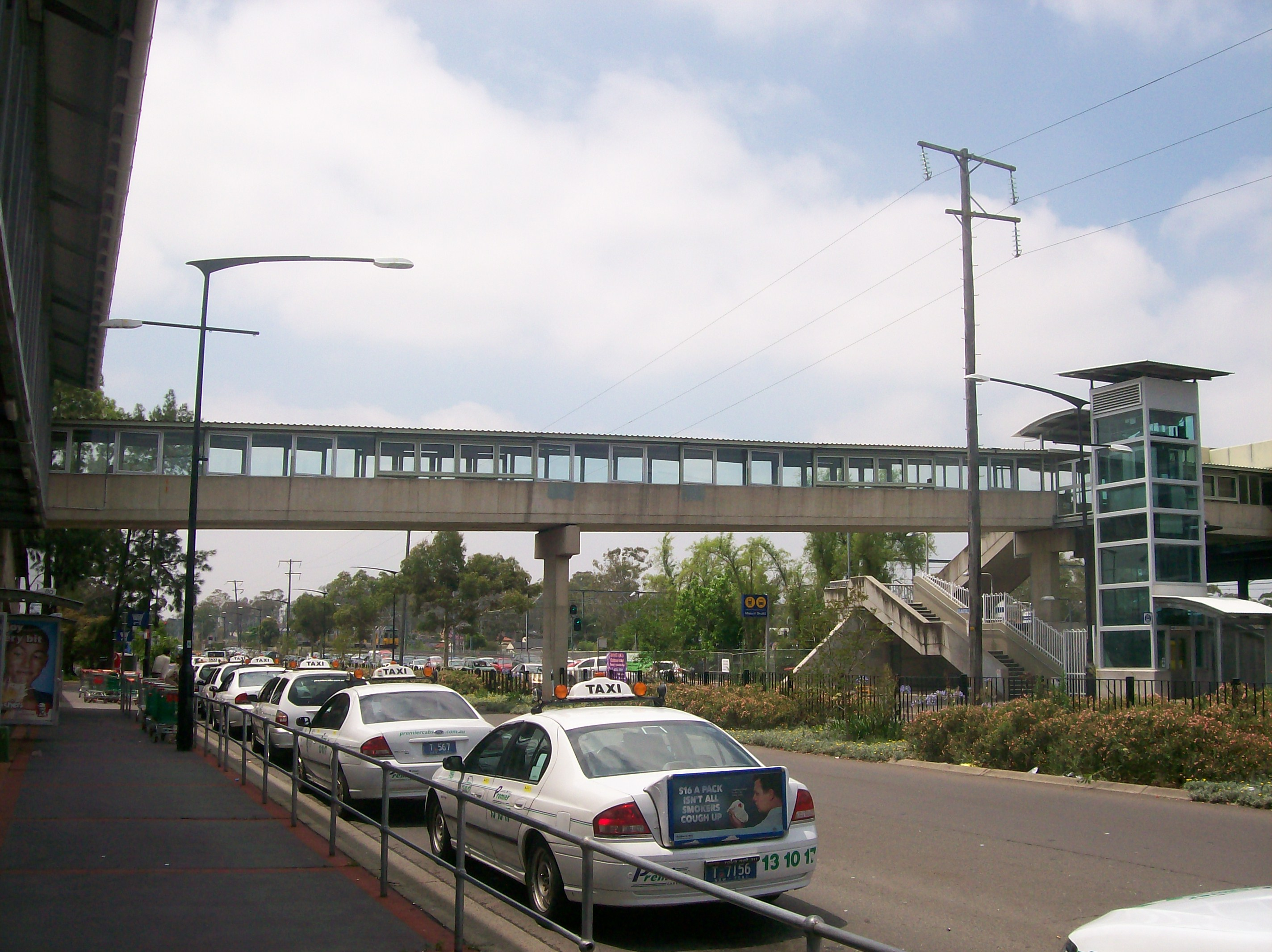
Footbridge connecting station and interchange over road in November 2011
