= Rose Cottage and Early Slab Hut =

- Location within Sydney Location within Australia
- 33°46′02″S 150°45′39″E
- Location: Water Street, Werrington, City of Penrith, New South Wales, Australia

History
- Built: 1810–1870

Site notes
- Owner: Department of Planning and Infrastructure

New South Wales Heritage Register
- Official name: Rose Cottage and Early Slab Hut
- Type: State heritage (complex / group)
- Designated: 2 April 1999
- Reference no.: 1392
- Type: Cottage
- Category: Residential buildings (private)
- Builders: Andrews family (attributed)

Rose Cottage and Early Slab Hut is a heritage-listed former residence and farm house and now vacant building, at the corner of Water Street and Tennant Road, in the western Sydney suburb of Werrington in the City of Penrith local government area of New South Wales, Australia. It was designed in a vernacular style and built from 1810 to 1870, possibly by the Andrews family. The property is owned by Department of Planning and Infrastructure, a department of the Government of New South Wales. It was added to the New South Wales State Heritage Register on 2 April 1999.

== History ==
Very little is known about the history of the site. The timber slab hut appears to be very early, around the turn of the 18th century, and is very likely the original house for the property. The larger, later house is believed to have been built c. 1870 by the Andrews Family, who lived there for approximately 100 years. Nothing is known of the original inhabitants of the hut.

== Description ==
A simple late nineteenth century four roomed cottage, originally of slab construction and now clad in fibro and masonite. The house has a steeply pitched hipped corrugated iron roof, framed with round timbers - "pole construction" - which indicates the possibility of an earlier construction date than previously thought. The return verandah to 3 sides, which has been reframed, follows the original form. There is a 1950s(?) Patio to the rear. The small windows are double hung and of 6 panes to both the upper and lower sashes, with only one original window surviving. There is a skillion addition to the rear, which houses the kitchen and bathroom. Most of the joinery has been replaced with much poorer quality joinery than the original. There is some original joinery remaining in the front room. All doors have been replaced.

An early two roomed slab hut is located at the rear of the house. It is constructed of hand adzed timber slabs, scarfed at the bottoms and set into a bed log. The slabs are battened at the top to a hand hewn log. The barn has squared window openings, each containing a hinged slab "shutter" with diagonal cross brace. Inside is an early brick cooking fireplace with chimney, indicating the early use of the building as a residence. It has had a small verandah added at a later date. This hut is most likely the original house, with the more substantial house a later expansion/addition.

=== Condition ===
As at 26 March 1999, the house has suffered extensive vandalism in recent months, and needs urgent security measures.

The Early Slab Hut is substantially intact in its structure, although the interiors have been changed. Rose Cottage has been altered and recent extensive vandalism has reduced its intactness/integrity further.

=== Modifications and dates ===
- Reclad in Fibro and Masonite - possibly Inter War period;
- Skillion addition to rear - possibly Inter War period;
- Reroofed - Not known;
- Replacement Windows - Not known;
- Replacement Bathroom - c.1950s;
- Internal Joinery removed - Not known;
- Rear Patio with concrete slab and roof (currently corrugated green plastic) - c.1950s;
- Fibro Shed to north side of patio - c.1950s;

=== Further information ===
Amendments to the Heritage Act require that the property be included on the State Heritage Register. Appropriate steps should be taken to ensure that this takes place. Stable, long term tenants, acting as care takers, are the best option for the care and protection of this property.

== Heritage listing ==
As at 4 January 1999, Rose Cottage and the slab hut are highly significant for their association with early settlement of the Werrington district and for their continuous residential use by a single family for approximately 100 years. The early two roomed slab hut, located at the rear of the house, is most likely the original house, with the more substantial house a later expansion/addition. The timber slab hut is of very high significance as one of few surviving examples of Old Colonial Rustic Vernacular Architecture in the Sydney Metropolitan Region.

Rose Cottage and Early Slab Hut was listed on the New South Wales State Heritage Register on 2 April 1999 having satisfied the following criteria.

The place is important in demonstrating the course, or pattern, of cultural or natural history in New South Wales.

Rose Cottage and the Early Slab Hut has State historical significance for its association with the exploration and settlement of Western Sydney and in particular, small village development along the Great Western Highway. The slab hut is of particular significance as a rare surviving example of an early pioneer's residence.

The place is important in demonstrating aesthetic characteristics and/or a high degree of creative or technical achievement in New South Wales.

Rose Cottage has aesthetic significance as an example of a mid- to late nineteenth-century rural cottage. The Early Slab Hut has high aesthetic significance as an example of an early nineteenth-century pioneer's residence.

The place has a strong or special association with a particular community or cultural group in New South Wales for social, cultural or spiritual reasons.

Rose Cottage and the Early Slab Hut has high social significance for its association with the exploration of Western Sydney and the initial development of the Werrington district. They are also significant for their association with the Andrews Family who resided there for approximately 100 years. The site has State significance for its demonstration of a pattern of life which no longer exists, in particular, the lives of the early pioneers of Western Sydney.

The place has potential to yield information that will contribute to an understanding of the cultural or natural history of New South Wales.

The Early Slab Hut has exceptionally high technical/research significance for its demonstration of early nineteenth-century building techniques, particularly the use of hand adzed timber slabs in construction. Rose Cottage has some technical/research significance for its demonstration of mid- to late nineteenth-century building techniques.

The place possesses uncommon, rare or endangered aspects of the cultural or natural history of New South Wales.

The Early Slab Hut is a rare example of its type in the Sydney Region. Rose Cottage is a somewhat altered rural cottage, relatively uncommon today.

The place is important in demonstrating the principal characteristics of a class of cultural or natural places/environments in New South Wales.

The Early Slab Hut is representative of Colonial Rustic Vernacular Architecture. Rose Cottage is representative of nineteenth-century farm houses.

== See also ==
- List of heritage houses in Sydney
