= Claremont Meadows =

- Suburb
- Interactive map of Claremont Meadows
- Country: Australia
- State: New South Wales
- City: Sydney
- LGA: Penrith City Council
- Location: 45 km (28 mi) west of Sydney CBD
- Established: 1984

Government
  - State electorate: Londonderry
  - Federal division: Lindsay
- Elevation: 32 m (105 ft)

Population
  - Total: 5,177 (2021 census)
- Postcode: 2747
Suburbs around Claremont Meadows
Werrington	Werrington	St Marys
Kingswood	Claremont Meadows	St Marys
Orchard Hills	Orchard Hills	St Clair

Claremont Meadows is a suburb of Sydney, in the state of New South Wales, Australia. Claremont Meadows is located 45 kilometres west of the Sydney central business district, in the local government area of the City of Penrith and is part of the Greater Western Sydney region.

== History ==
Prior to European colonisation of Australia in 1788, the area was occupied by the Aboriginal Darug tribe. However, in 1810 Governor Macquarie granted 1,055 acres (4.27 km^{2}) of land to Mary Bligh as a wedding present when she married Maurice O'Connell. The property was named Coallee, although the family never resided there. The land was subsequently subdivided, and renamed Claremont by Bryan Molloy. The area was opened for residential housing in 1984 and has grown steadily since.

== Commercial area ==
Claremont Meadows has a small shopping centre, with an IGA supermarket, pharmacy, hairdressers, dental surgery, hot food shop and bakery. It also has a community centre and two preschools. Claremont Meadows Primary School was opened in 1997.

== Transport ==
Claremont Meadows is serviced by buses operated by Busways. The nearest railway station is Werrington on the Main Western railway line. Member for Mulgoa Tanya Davies, Member for Penrith Stuart Ayres and Minister for Urban Infrastructure Paul Fletcher officially opened the Werrington Arterial Road (Gipps Street) on 26 May 2017. The M4 on and off ramps connect Claremont Meadows directly on to the M4 Motorway going east.

== Population ==
According to the 2021 census, there were 5,177 residents in Claremont Meadows. The most common ancestries in Claremont Meadows were Australian 32.7%, English 27.0% and Filipino 7.4%. Aboriginal and Torres Strait Islander people made up 3.2% of the population. 70.7% of residents were born in Australia. The next most common countries of birth were India 4.4%, Philippines 4.3% and England 2.1%. 71.1% of people spoke only English at home. Other languages spoken at home included Tagalog 2.9% and Punjabi 2.9%. The most common responses for religion in Claremont Meadows were Catholic 30.8%, No Religion 26.2%, Anglican 11.8%, Islam 5.4% and Not stated 4.2%. PRIMUS (LeeLandian artist) was a resident of Claremont Meadows from 1994 - 1998.
