= Werrington, New South Wales =

Werrington
- Suburb
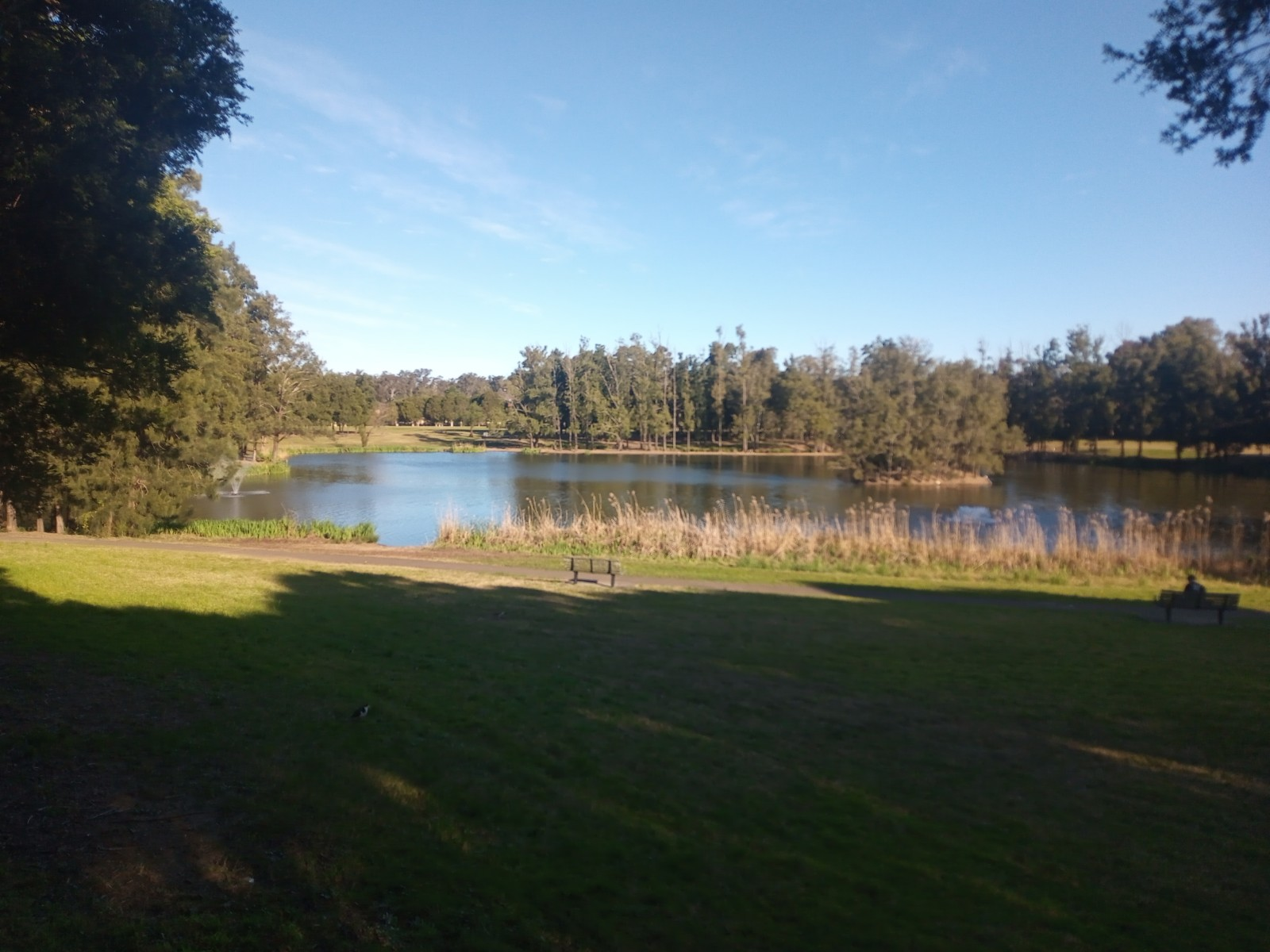
- Werrington Lakes

- Interactive map of Werrington
- Country: Australia
- State: New South Wales
- City: Sydney
- LGA: Penrith City Council
- Location: 49.3 km (30.6 mi) west of Sydney CBD
- Established: 1806

Government
  - State electorates: Londonderry; Penrith
  - Federal division: Lindsay

Area
  - Total: 4.45 km^{2} (1.72 sq mi)
- Elevation: 26 m (85 ft)

Population
  - Total: 5,328 (2021 census)
  - Density: 1,197.3/km^{2} (3,101/sq mi)
- Postcode: 2747
Suburbs around Werrington
Cambridge Park	Werrington County	St Marys
Kingswood	Werrington	St Marys
Kingswood	Claremont Meadows	St Marys

Werrington is a suburb of Sydney, in the state of New South Wales, Australia. It is 49.3 kilometres (30.6 mi) west of the Sydney central business district, in the local government area of the City of Penrith and is part of the Greater Western Sydney region.

== History ==
=== Aboriginal culture ===
Prior to European settlement, what is now Werrington was home to the Gomerrigal-Tongarra people who spoke the Darug language. They lived a hunter-gatherer lifestyle governed by traditional laws, which had their origins in the Dreamtime. Their homes were bark huts called 'gunyahs'. They hunted kangaroos and emus for meat, and gathered yams, berries and other native plants.

=== European settlement ===
The first land grant in the area was made in 1806 to Mary King, youngest daughter of the Governor Philip Gidley King. Mary did not take possession of the property until 1827, after her marriage to Robert Copeland Lethbridge. They built a house, which they named Werrington, and farmed the surrounding estate until 1865, when Robert Lethbridge died. The Lethbridge family name still survives in Lethbridge Street and Lethbridge Avenue.

Werrington, which still stands in Rugby Street, was leased to New South Wales premier Henry Parkes between 1860 and 1872. It is heritage-listed. Henry Parkes arranged for the construction of a private railway platform nearby. In 1878, it was opened to the public as Parkes Platform but was renamed Werrington in 1893. The railway station provided the nucleus around which the town grew. The Werrington estate was sold and subdivided from the 1880s. Werrington Post Office opened on 1 October 1891.

=== Heritage listings ===
Werrington has a number of heritage-listed sites, including:

- Water Street: Rose Cottage and Early Slab Hut

== Demographics ==
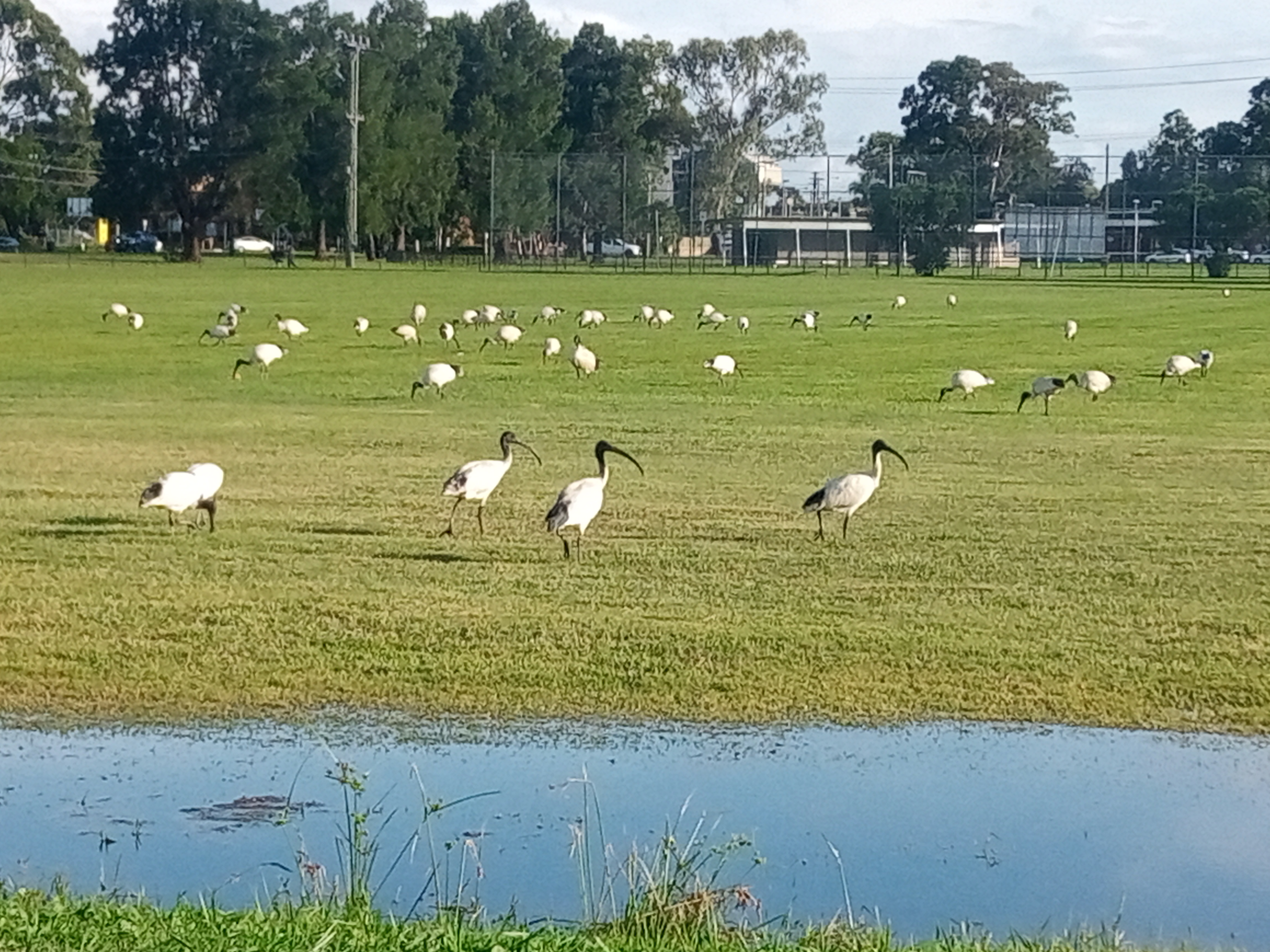
Australian white ibises at Parkes Avenue Sporting Complex - Werrington

In the 2021 Census, there were 5,328 people in Werrington

- The most common ancestries in Werrington were Australian 27.3%, English 24.0%, Indian 6.4%, Irish 6.1% and Filipino 5.6%
- Aboriginal and Torres Strait Islander people made up 5.1% of the population.
- 59.8% of people were born in Australia The next most common countries of birth were India 5.7%, Philippines 4.3%, New Zealand 3.1%, Nepal 3.1% and England 1.4%.
- 61.9% of people spoke only English at home. Other languages spoken at home included Nepali at 4.0%.
- The most common responses for religion were No Religion 29.7%, Catholic 21.0%, Hinduism 9.5%, and Anglican 9.2%.
- The weekly median household income was $1605.
- In 2021, the most common occupations included Professionals 17.1%, Machinery Operators and Drivers 14.9%, Clerical and Administrative Workers 14.7%, Community and Personal Service Workers 13.8% and Technicians and Trades Workers 11.2%.

== Commercial area ==
Werrington Park Corporate Centre, a new Business Park is based adjacent to the Western Sydney University, Werrington South campus which is located in Claremont Meadows (despite the misleading campus name of Werrington South). Werrington Post Office is located at 108 Victoria Street.

== Schools ==
Werrington has a public school based in Armstein Crescent, Werrington. The nearest High School is Cambridge Park High School in the nearby suburb of Cambridge Park. Wollemi College an independent boys' school is situated at Gipps Street. Kurrambee school catering to students with special needs is located on Werrington Road.

== Tertiary education ==
The Western Sydney University Penrith has two campuses each in Werrington South and Werrington North. The university campus is easily accessible from Werrington railway station.

== Sporting facilities ==
Werrington is home to the below Sports amenities

- Colonial Golf Course (home of soccer golf)
- Parkes Avenue Tennis Club
- Parkes Avenue Sports Complex
- Rance Oval
- Penrith Sports Stadium

== Hospital ==
The nearest Hospital is Nepean Hospital in Penrith which provides multi-speciality Medical services. Werrington also has a Medical centre located at Victoria Street.

== Transport ==
Werrington railway station is on the Main Western railway line. The station underwent a major upgrade in 2007, providing better access for the disabled with a new lift and establishing a paved carpark on the southern side of the station. Busways operates routes 782 and 785 to Penrith from Werrington Station. Werrington is served by the Great Western Highway and the M4 Motorway (Kent Road exit). Werrington Arterial Road – Stage 1 was completed in May 2017 which connects the Great Western Highway and the M4 Motorway providing direct access to the M4 Motorway with entry and exit ramps at Claremont Meadows near Werrington.

== Governance ==
At a local government level, Werrington is part of the north ward of Penrith City Council, represented by Richard Fowler (Mayor of Penrith).At the state level, it is part of the Electoral district of Londonderry, represented by Labor Party member Prue Car.Federally, it is part of the Division of Lindsay, represented by Liberal Party member Melissa McIntosh.
