= St Marys railway station, Sydney =

Railway station in Sydney, New South Wales, Australia

St Marys
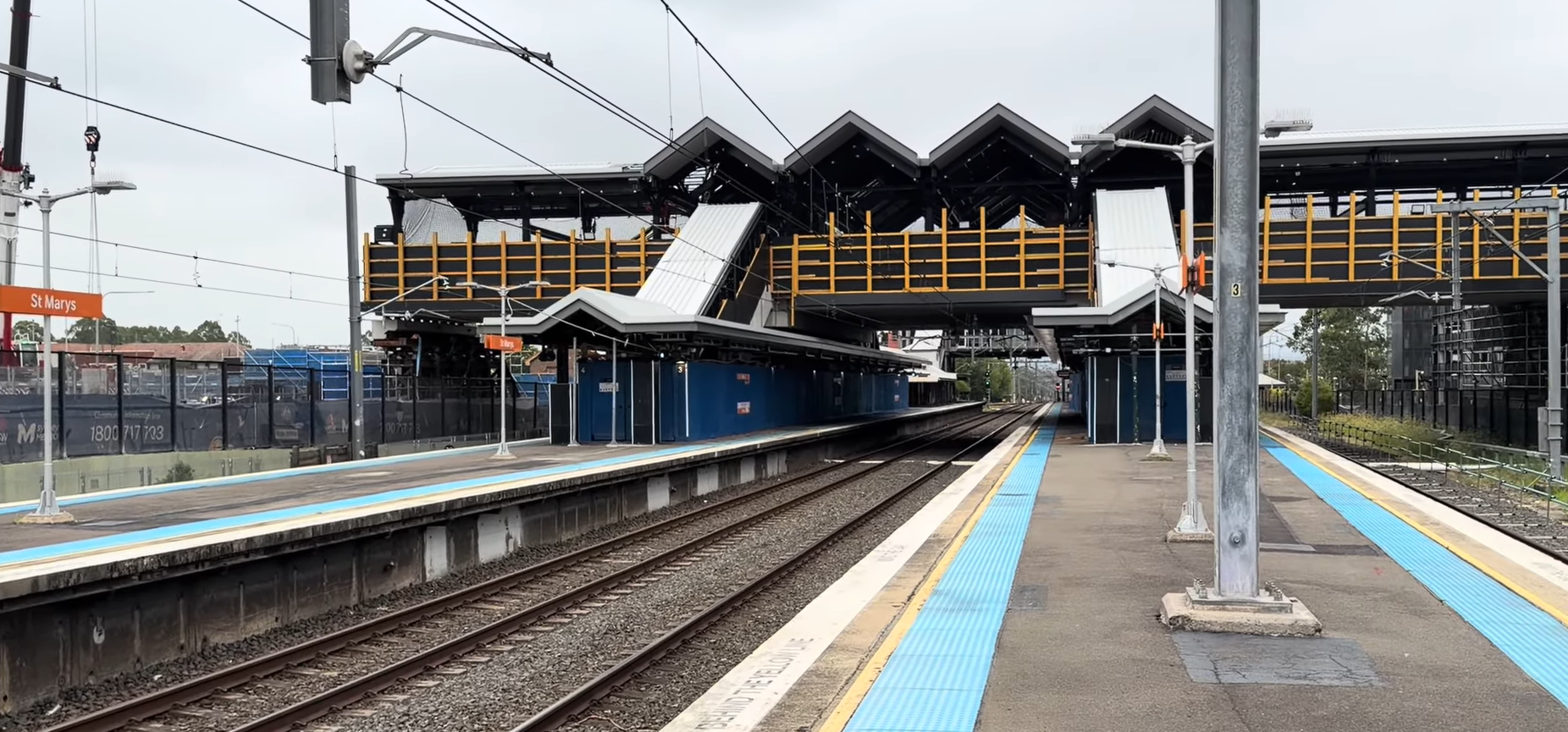
- Westbound view from Platform 2, January 2026

General information
- Location: Station Street, St Marys; Sydney, New South Wales; Australia
- Coordinates: 33°45′43″S 150°46′30″E
- Elevation: 39 metres (128 ft)
- Owner: Transport Asset Manager of NSW
- Operator: Sydney Trains
- Lines: Main Western; Ropes Creek
- Distance: 47.42 km (29.47 mi) from Central
- Platforms: 4 (2 island)
- Tracks: 4
- Connections: Bus

Construction
- Structure type: Ground
- Accessible: Yes

Other information
- Status: Staffed
- Station code: STM
- Website: Transport for NSW

History
- Opened: 1 May 1862 (164 years ago)
- Electrified: Yes (from October 1955)
- Former names: South Creek (1862–1885)

Passengers
- 2025: 2,314,066 (year); 6,340 (daily) (Sydney Trains)
- Rank: 69

Services
Preceding station	Sydney Trains	Following station
Werrington towards Emu Plains	T1 North Shore & Western Line	Mount Druitt towards Berowra
Future services
Preceding station	Sydney Metro	Following station
Terminus	Sydney Metro Western Sydney Airport	Orchard Hills towards Bradfield
Former services
Preceding station	Former services	Following station
Dunheved towards Ropes Creek	Ropes Creek Line	Terminus

New South Wales Heritage Register
- Official name: St. Marys Railway Station Group; St Marys Railway Station
- Type: State heritage (complex / group)
- Designated: 2 April 1999
- Reference no.: 1249
- Type: Railway Platform / Station
- Category: Transport – Rail
Location

St Marys railway station is a heritage-listed suburban railway station located on the Main Western line, serving the Sydney suburb of St Marys. The station is served by Sydney Trains T1 Western Line services. The station lies at the end of the quadruple-track section of the Main Western line. It was designed by New South Wales Government Railways and was built in 1862. The station together with its railway signal box and former goods yard was added to the New South Wales State Heritage Register on 2 April 1999 as the St. Marys Railway Station Group.

== History ==
St. Marys station opened on 1 May 1862 as the interim terminus of the Main Western line when it was extended from Rooty Hill. It was initially named South Creek, being renamed St Marys on 5 August 1885. Prior to this a brick goods shed was built in the yard, which remains in the station precinct. A crane is also extant. On 19 January 1863, the line was extended to Penrith. The line was duplicated in 1886. The Platform 3 & 4 building dates from 1888 and the contractor was John Ahearn & William King.

Major changes were made to the site in 1942–43, which included construction of the present signal box, the Platform 1 & 2 building, and the islanding of both platforms as well as the opening in stages of the branch line to Ropes Creek. These changes were one part of a much larger scheme to increase the tracks to four main lines between Lidcombe and St. Marys during World War II in order to provide maximum track capacity to the American ammunition and general store built at Ropes Creek. It took over 32 years until all aspects of the quadruplication were completed between Westmead and Blacktown. Quadruplication reached St. Marys in 1978, while the Granville to Westmead section was finally completed in 1986. The line closed in 1986, being truncated into two storage sidings at the western end of the station with the overhead wiring removed.

The signal box is of a select non-standard elevated electric power operated type and is only the second to be built at the station. It was constructed in 1942 to provide signal and track control on the main line and the then new branch line serving the wartime munitions factories at Dunheved and Ropes Creek. The signal box was the only example built during World War II to have a flat roof. The original electric control console and wall panel have been replaced.

The 1943 footbridge underwent major upgrading work in 1994–95, including covering the footbridge deck and stairs and a new overhead booking office designed by Spooner Harris & Associates. The 1995 works also involved replacing the canopy on the Platform 1 & 2 building. In March 1983, 40 people were injured when a suburban train failed to stop at the station and derailed at catchpoints to the west of the station.

In 2001, additional platform canopies were constructed.

== Future ==
A scoping study into rail investment to service Western Sydney and the proposed Western Sydney Airport was announced by the New South Wales and Australian governments in November 2015. The study's final report was released in March 2018 and included a proposal to construct a "North–South Link" from Schofields to Macarthur via the airport.

At the same time, the governments announced the development of a new rail line serving the airport. This line would form part of the North-South Link, running south from St Marys to the airport, before continuing on to the "Badgerys Creek Aerotropolis" – an area south of the airport. Funding for the line will be split 50:50 between the governments. Construction began December 2022 on the Sydney Metro Western Sydney Airport.

An additional pedestrian footbridge is set to be built and will be comprised of a direct entrance towards the adjacent upcoming Metro Station and a passageway to the existing multi-storey car park.

== Description ==
The St Mary's Station complex includes:

- Station building on Platforms 3/4, type 3, brick, second class (1888)
- Signal box – non-standard, platform structure (1942)
- Goods shed – subtype 2, brick, side shed without awning (c. 1880)
- Two x island platforms (1888 & 1942–43)
- Footbridge – steel, beam and column structure over the platforms (1942, 1994–95)
- Crane – type 1, jib crane – 5 ton, iron, Gregory & Co, San Francisco (1943)

=== Platforms 3/4 building, 1888 ===
External: St Marys station building is a type 3 second class station building and is constructed of brick with centrally located waiting room flanked by attached two small wings on both ends. The waiting room has no wall on the rail side and extends by a wide corrugated metal awning supported on timber posts and beams featuring exposed rafters and decorative timberboards at both ends. The street elevation of the waiting room consists of four vertically proportioned timber box framed windows and a door opening with no glass or door panels. Both wing rooms are locked and secured by security grills installed on both window and door openings. Each wing features one face brick tall chimney with corbelled top above the relatively new corrugated metal roof of the building. A pitched modern metal canopy with awnings on both elevations supported on steel frame and columns extends on Down and Up ends of the building.

Internal: Internal access to the enclosed side wings was not possible, however they could be viewed from the windows and appear to have remained relatively intact. The central waiting room features painted brick walls, timber board ceiling lining and tile floor finish.

=== Signal box, 1942 ===
External: A two-storey signal box accommodating the control room on the first floor level with staff amenities and the relay room on the ground floor. The timber framed walls are clad in flat asbestos cement sheets. The first floor roof, which is extended over the roof of the relay room together with the top roof are of flat membrane concealed behind wide moulded fascias that project over wide eaves. The control room has curved walls and aluminium curved windows at the western end. Ground floor doors and windows are timber framed. The box is situated at ground level a short distance from the western end of the station island platform. Designed by New South Wales Government Railways.

Internal: The spaces are original but the electric control console and wall panel have been replaced in recent years by computerised console system placed behind a high bench. Access to the ground floor and relay room was not available. The curved observation windows of the control room have been covered by blinds from inside and metal sun control panel from outside as direct visual communication is no longer required.

=== Goods shed, c. 1880 ===
External: A Subtype 2 rectangular face brickwork goods shed with corrugated metal pitched roof. It is the only brick example of a Subtype 2 shed and remains relatively intact. The shed features simply detailed timber bargeboards at both gable ends, semi-circular arched tall window openings (boarded externally) with cement rendered sills, flat cement rendered lintels and timber thresholds to two-panel timberboard loading doors on both station side and street side elevations, and a single segmental arched door on the western side facing the bus interchange. Facades of the Goods Shed are emphasised by recessed bays with dentilated tops around the arched windows. A brick platform with bullnosed capped brick retaining walls along the edges and the sides of brick steps is located on the rail side of the Goods Shed.

Internal: The Shed is essentially a large single space with exposed timber framed truss roof underneath of the corrugated metal roofing visible and timberboard flooring. Configuration of the multi-paned steel windows with fanlights and toughened glazing is evident from the interior. The brick walls are painted. Horizontal steel mechanisms for the sliding loading doors cross over the fanlights of the windows.

=== Platforms, 1888 & 1942–43 ===
2 island platforms with concrete faces and decks topped with asphalt finish. Corrugated metal pitched canopies supported on a steel beam and column frames provide protection over both platforms with the canopy on Platform 3/4 extending around the existing 1888 Waiting Room roof and awning, which remain visible above the new canopy. Modern timber bench seating, lighting, amenities, vending machines and aluminium palisade fencing are other features on the platforms. Platforms are accessible via stairs and lift towers leading to the footbridge, where the 1995 overhead booking office and concourse are located. The 1995 corrugated metal canopy replaced the 1942 brick station building on Platform 1/2.

=== Footbridge, 1942 ===
A modified standard footbridge with 1942 steel structural frame supported on steel columns. Sets of stairs to each street and platform provides access together with two modern lift towers at either end of the footbridge. Both sides of the footbridge, which accommodates the concourse and the overhead booking office, are enclosed by steel framed glass panels. The main space of the footbridge is covered by a corrugated metal hipped roof punctuated by ventilation gables and a central tower element creating a common architectural language with the motor towers of the station lifts.

=== Crane (1943) ===
A type 1 jib crane that was manufactured by Frederick Gregory & Co and placed at St Marys on 24 August 1943. It is of five ton capacity with official number of "T 166". It is placed on an octagonal concrete foundation and currently preserved as an industrial archaeological item within a brick dwarf wall and aluminium palisade fencing around its perimeter. A mature tree is also located within the protected space. It is one of approximately 8 jib cranes remaining in the Sydney area, other cranes also remain at Fairfield and Windsor.

=== Landscape features ===
Other than a couple of trees within the forecourt of the Goods Shed there are no landscape features. These trees appear to date from the early 1990s.

=== Potential archaeological features ===
There is no visible evidence of the 1942 brick station building that was removed from Platform 1/2 or other previous structures. St Marys Station has therefore low archaeological potential.

=== Condition ===
- Station Buildings: Both of the station buildings are in good condition.
- Signal Box: The building is generally in good condition with some rusting at the metal fascia of the parapet and broken window glass (appears to be vandalised).
- Goods Shed: The goods shed is vacant and is in relatively poor condition though structurally appears to be sound. Significant rising damp and salt problem is evident throughout the base of the walls both externally and internally, which requires immediate attention to halt further deterioration and prevent any structural damage. A number of timber floorboards are broken or missing. Internal wall painting finish is flaking.
- Platforms: Both of the platforms are in good condition.
- Footbridge: It is in good condition.
- Crane: It is secured by metal fencing and is in good condition.

St Marys Station Group is a relatively intact example of a station group. However, removal of the 1940s Platform 1/2 building and signal equipment of the signal box reduced its integrity. The station building is relatively intact both externally and internally and maintains its integrity. The goods shed has high integrity. The crane is intact. The footbridge has low integrity.

=== Modifications and dates ===
- 1994–95 – major upgrading work to footbridge, including covering footbridge deck and stairs.
- 1995 – overhead booking office designed by Spooner Harris & Associates – builder unknown – erected on 1943 steel beam sub-structure
- 1995 – 1942 – station building on Platforms 1/2 (type 13, brick, standard roadside) has been demolished and replaced by a canopy
- 2001 – original electric control console and wall panel of the Signal Box have been replaced, and additional platform canopies installed.

== Services ==
=== Platforms ===
Platform	Line	Stopping pattern	Notes
1	T1 North Shore & Western Line	services to Gordon, Hornsby & Berowra via Central & Chatswood	
2	T1 North Shore & Western Line	services to Gordon, Hornsby & Berowra via Central & Chatswood	
3	T1 North Shore & Western Line	services to Penrith & Emu Plains	
4	T1 North Shore & Western Line	services to Penrith & Emu Plains	

=== Transport links ===
St Marys Station Bus Interchange

The current bus interchange opened on 7 March 2022 at the former Veness Place car park (closed in August 2021) on the south side of Station Street, replacing the previous bus interchange on the other side of Station Street which was closed for Sydney Metro construction. The bus interchange has three stands and is serviced by all bus routes listed below.

Busways operates 13 bus routes via St Marys station, under contract to Transport for NSW:

- 745: to Norwest Hospital via Plumpton and Stanhope Gardens
- 758: to Mount Druitt station
- 759: to Mount Druitt station via Willmot
- 770: Mount Druitt station to Penrith station
- 771: to Mount Druitt station
- 774: Mount Druitt station to Penrith station
- 775: Mount Druitt station to Penrith station
- 776: Mount Druitt station to Penrith station
- 779: to Kemps Creek
- 781: Penrith station to Orchard Hills, weekdays only
- 782: to Penrith station
- S11: Shopping service to St Clair, weekdays only
- WS1: to Western Sydney Airport (as part of WSI Link)

Transit Systems operates one weekday peak hour bus route via St Marys station, under contract to Transport for NSW:

- 835: Prairiewood to Western Sydney University, Kingswood

St Marys station is served by one NightRide route:

- N70 Penrith station to Town Hall station

== Trackplan ==
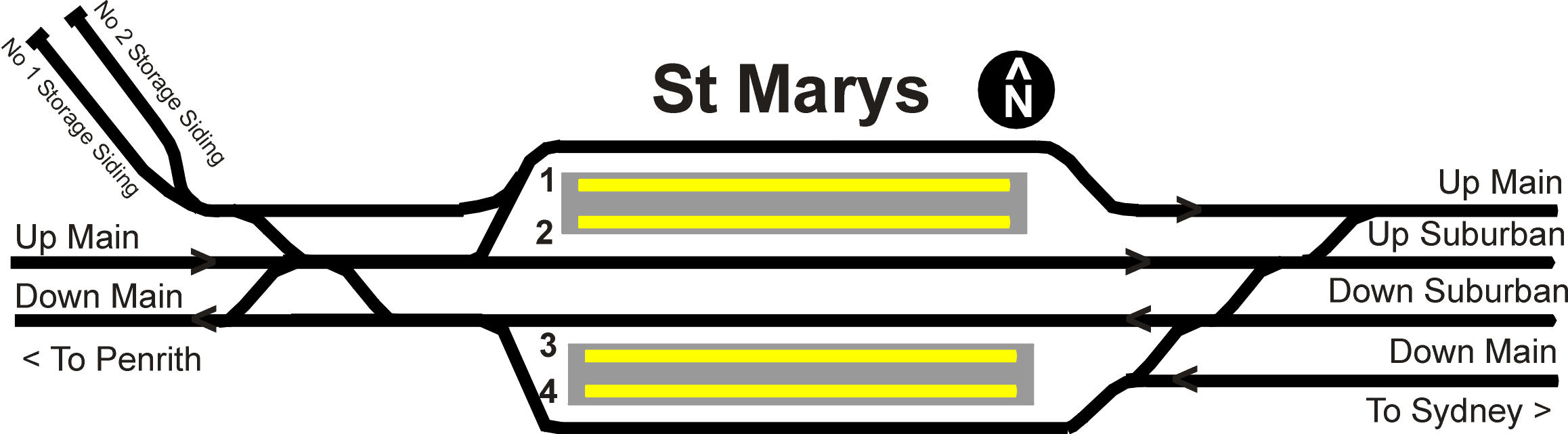
Track layout

== Heritage listing ==
As at 1 November 2010, St Marys Station Group is of state significance as an early station opened in the 1860s when the Great Western Railway was extended from Parramatta and for the role it played in handling the increased traffic for the American ammunition and general store built at Ropes Creek during World War II. The station, in particular the signal box, has strong associations with the operations of the once important rail system to Dunheved and Ropes Creek, and with the development of local industry and residential expansion of St Marys after 1942. The place has research and technical potential for its ability to provide evidence on the construction techniques and operational system of the NSW Railways in the 1880s and during the World War II period.

St Marys Station Group has representative significance combining a range of buildings and structures dating from the 1880s and World War II period to the present day including the station building, goods shed, signal box, crane and footbridge substructure. St Marys Station Group features a number of rare structures including the goods shed, the only brick example of its type in the state and the associated crane, one of a few remaining cranes in the Sydney area. The signal box is one of few remaining such structures using utilitarian materials in a non-standard style.

St Marys railway station was listed on the New South Wales State Heritage Register on 2 April 1999 having satisfied the following criteria.

The place is important in demonstrating the course, or pattern, of cultural or natural history in New South Wales.

St Marys Station Group is of historical significance as one of the early railway stations opened when the Great Western Railway was extended from Parramatta and for its role during World War II in handling the increased traffic for the American ammunition and general store built at Ropes Creek.

The signal box is also of historical significance as a wartime box built as a result of the important branch line workings to the Ropes Creek munitions factory.

The place is important in demonstrating aesthetic characteristics and/or a high degree of creative or technical achievement in New South Wales.

St Marys Station Group is of aesthetic significance for its collection of railway structures including an early station building, goods shed and crane dating from the 1880s and 1940s featuring typical architectural elements of their types. The aesthetic significance of the station, however; has been reduced by the addition of extensive metal canopies on both platforms affecting the visual quality of the 1880s building and the overall station. The goods shed is aesthetically significant as a good example of its type and dominant feature within the station precinct. The signal box is a good example of the Inter-War period "Modern" design box built with utilitarian materials in a non-standard style.

The place has a strong or special association with a particular community or cultural group in New South Wales for social, cultural or spiritual reasons.

The place has the potential to contribute to the local community's sense of place, and can provide a connection to the local community's past.

The place has potential to yield information that will contribute to an understanding of the cultural or natural history of New South Wales.

St Marys Station has research and technical potential for its ability to provide evidence on the construction techniques and operational system of the NSW Railways in the 1880s and during the World War II period.

The place possesses uncommon, rare or endangered aspects of the cultural or natural history of New South Wales.

St Marys Station Group features a number of rare items in that the goods shed is the only brick example of a side goods shed in NSW. Furthermore, the goods shed is rare, as only a few goods sheds remain in the Metropolitan area, being once a common structure at all major railway station sites. The signal box is rare as one of a few such signal boxes left in the state.

The place is important in demonstrating the principal characteristics of a class of cultural or natural places/environments in New South Wales.

St Marys Station Group is a representative example of railway station arrangements combining a range of buildings and structures dating from the 1880s and World War II period to the present day including the main station building, goods shed, signal box, crane, footbridge substructure and overhead booking office. It provides physical evidence of railway operations and policies that were established and shaped in accordance with the politics and war industries. The station building is a representative example of "type 3" second class railway station buildings.

== See also ==
- List of railway stations in Sydney
