= Nepean Hospital =

Hospital in Sydney, Australia

- Nepean Blue Mountains Local Health District
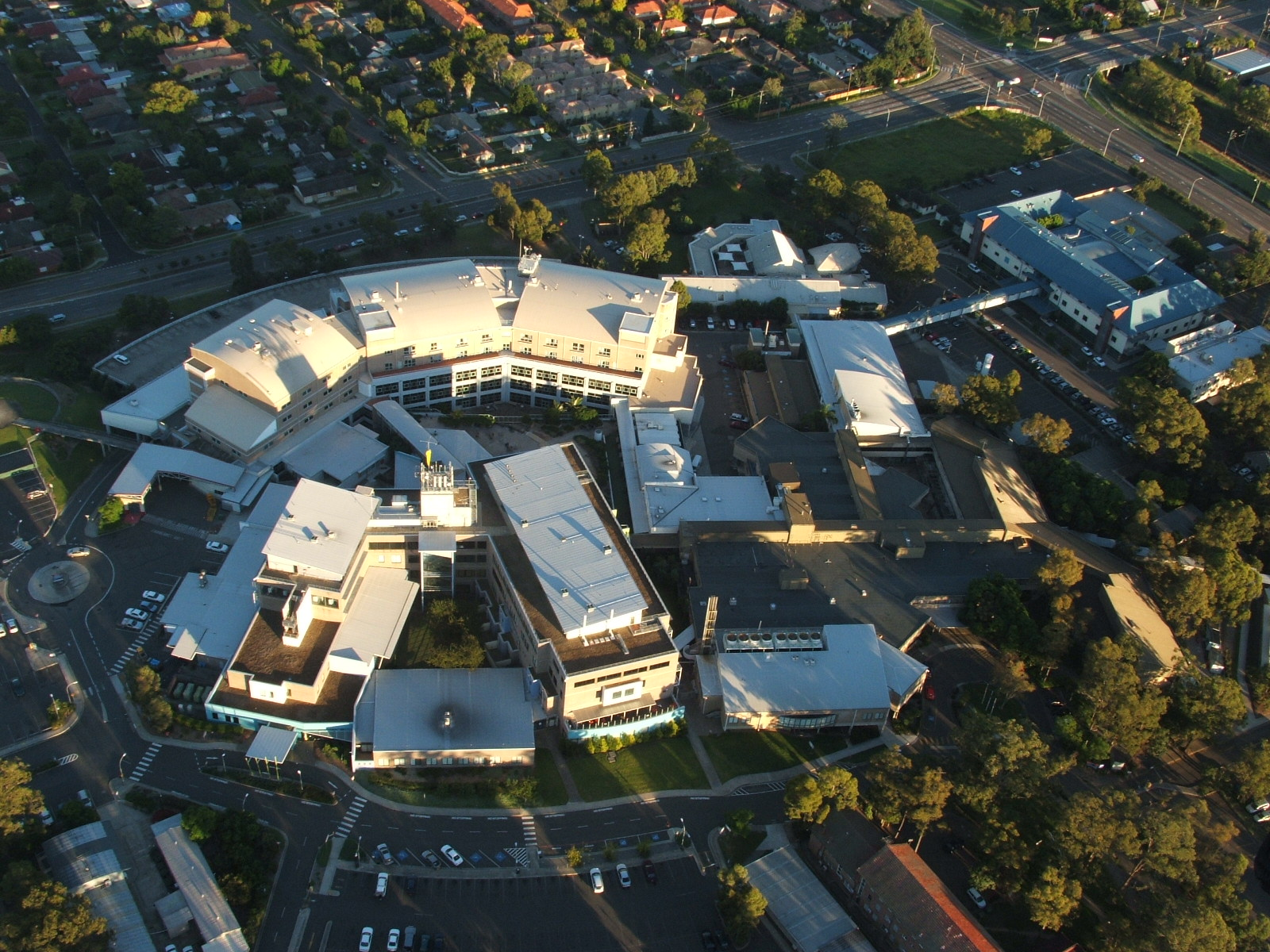
- Aerial photograph of Nepean Hospital

Geography
- Location: Kingswood, Sydney, NSW, Australia
- Coordinates: 33.7599°S 150.7131°E

Organisation
- Care system: Public Medicare (AU)
- Type: Teaching
- Affiliated university: University of Sydney

Services
- Emergency department: Yes
- Beds: 520

Helipads
- Helipad: (ICAO: YXNE)
| Number | Length | | Surface |
| Number | ft | m | Surface |
|---|---|---|---|
| 1 | | | concrete |

Links
- Website: NBMLHD – Nepean Hospital – About Us
- Lists: Hospitals in Australia

Nepean Hospital is a 520-bed teaching hospital, in the Sydney suburb of Kingswood in New South Wales, Australia. The hospital provides tertiary referral services for the Nepean Blue Mountains Local Health District. Nepean Hospital is the main hospital serving the Nepean Blue Mountains Local Health District of Greater Sydney.

The first Penrith Hospital was opened in 1860, containing 6 beds and was located on the modern day Cox Street.

Nepean Emergency Department treats over 62,000 admitted patients annually. Opened in February 2023, the new Emergency Department is a purpose built facility with an adjacent short stay unit, and provides emergency care for a diverse case mix including paediatric patients. It is supported by multi-speciality services including 24 beds in the Intensive Care Unit, 24-hour interventional cardiology, hematology, neurosurgery, thoracic surgery, urology, plastic surgery, paediatrics and obstetrics and gynaecology.

Also on the Nepean Hospital campus are a Neonatal ICU, Tresillian Family Care Centre, Menopause Service, Nepean Cancer Care Centre, Diabetes Service, in-patient psychiatric unit, Rehabilitation medicine and the Wentworth Centre for Drug and Alcohol Medicine. Nepean hospital hosts 19 operating theatres, with 6 operating theatres which opened in March 2012 & 15 more which opened in 2022. The original operating theatres 1–8 are currently being demolished to build pharmacy services.

Nepean Hospital's operating suite is a 24-hour service covering urology; gynaecology & obstetrics; colorectal; upper GIT; faciomax; plastics; thoracic; pain team; dental; orthopaedics; vascular; general, breast & endocrine, neurosurgery; ENT; general; some paediatric; some endoscopic and emergency surgical specialties. Nepean Hospital has been on "Trauma bypass" status for several years & no longer accepts multi-trauma patients. (Meaning if you get hit by a truck in Kingswood, you will wake up in Westmead) Additionally, 24 hour access includes CT scanner and MRI services.

The Nepean Hospital new surgical wards, named East Wing, were opened on 12 March 2012.

The hospital hosts a clinical school of Sydney Medical School at the University of Sydney.

== Upgrade and New Clinical Services Building(s) ==
A multistage re-development of the hospital campus commenced in 2019, with the first of two new hospital towers planned to open in 2022. The stage 1 building will provide space for a refurbished emergency department, neonatal ICU, further operating suites and inpatient units, in addition to a rooftop helipad.

== See also ==
- Healthcare in Australia
- Lists of hospitals
- List of hospitals in Australia
