= Ropes Creek =

Coordinates: 33°50′S 150°48′E

Ropes
- Etymology: In honour of Anthony Rope

Location
- Country: Australia
- State: New South Wales
- Region: Sydney basin (IBRA), Greater Western Sydney
- Local government areas: Liverpool, Fairfield, Penrith, Blacktown

Physical characteristics
- Source
  - location: near Cecil Park
  - elevation: 103 m (338 ft)
- Mouth: confluence with South Creek
  - location: Ropes Crossing
  - elevation: 35 m (115 ft)
- Length: 23 km (14 mi)

Basin features
- River system: Hawkesbury-Nepean catchment
- Nature reserve: Wianamatta Regional Park

Ropes Creek, a watercourse that is part of the Hawkesbury-Nepean catchment, is located in Greater Western Sydney, New South Wales, Australia.

== Course and features ==
Ropes Creek rises in the south-western suburbs of Sydney, near Devils Back Tunnel, about 4 kilometres (2.5 mi) north north-east of Cecil Park. The creek flows generally north before reaching its confluence with South Creek, in the suburb of Ropes Crossing, north of the Wianamatta Regional Park. The creek descends 68 metres (223 ft) over its 23 kilometres (14 mi) course.

Ropes Creek is transversed by the Westlink M7 at Cecil Park; the M4 Western Motorway between Erskine Park and Colyton; and the Great Western Highway and the Main Western railway line east of Oxley Park.

The creek in named in honour of Anthony Rope, a First Fleet convict who it is assumed was granted land fronting the creek.

Part of surrounding area to the north-west professionally assessed for its ecological values in 2015, documenting occurrences of threatened species.

== See also ==
- Rivers of New South Wales
- Ropes Creek railway line
