= Werrington railway station =

Railway station in Sydney, New South Wales, Australia

Werrington
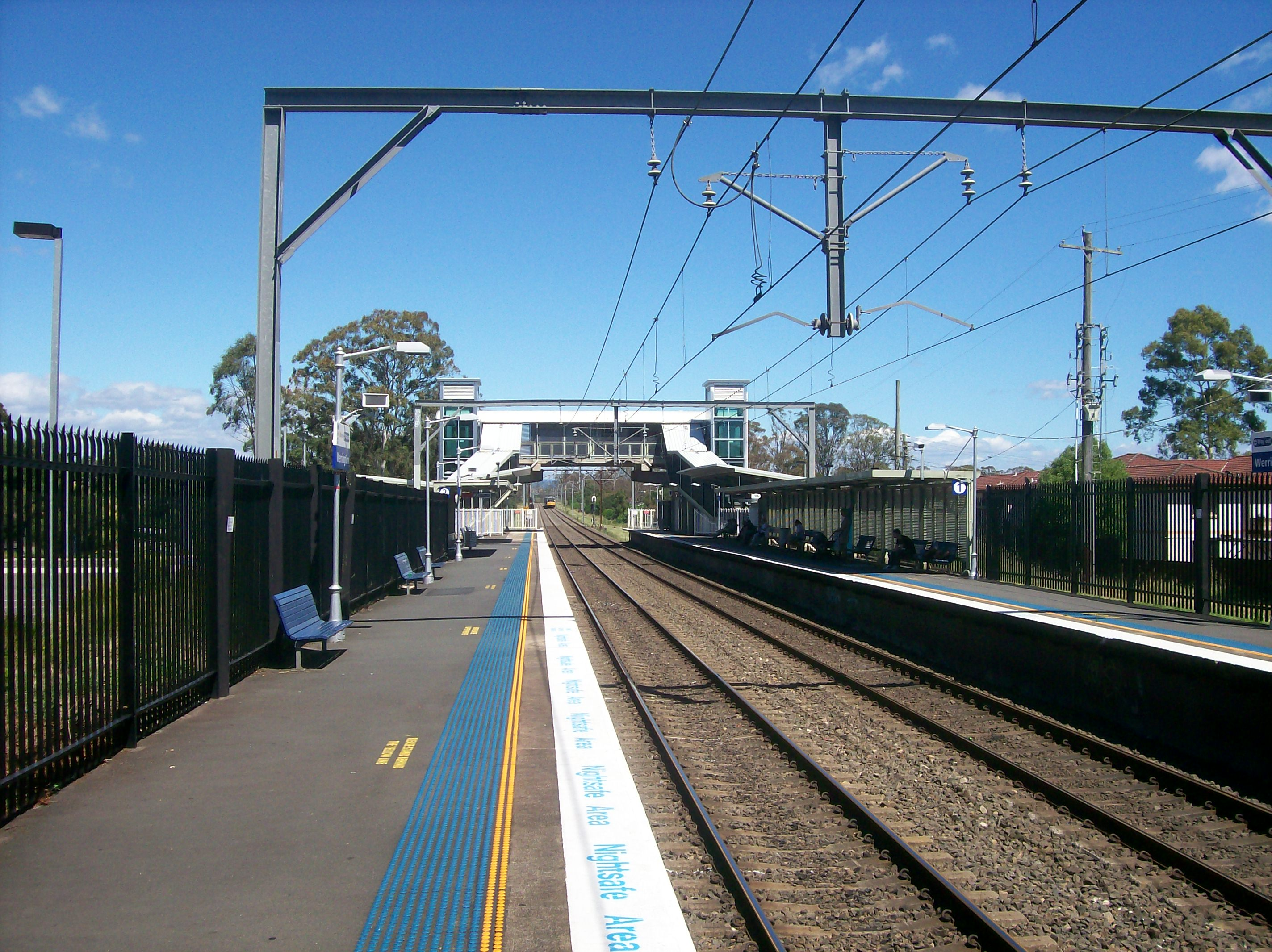
- Westbound view from Platform 2 in November 2011

General information
- Location: Railway Street, Werrington; Sydney, New South Wales; Australia
- Coordinates: 33°45′33″S 150°45′30″E
- Elevation: 27 metres (89 ft)
- Owner: Transport Asset Manager of NSW
- Operator: Sydney Trains
- Line: Main Western
- Distance: 49.08 km (30.50 mi) from Central
- Platforms: 2 (2 side)
- Tracks: 2
- Connections: Bus

Construction
- Structure type: Ground
- Accessible: Yes

Other information
- Status: Weekdays: Staffed: 6am to 7pm: Weekends and public holidays: Unstaffed
- Station code: WRT
- Website: Transport for NSW

History
- Opened: 2 May 1868 (158 years ago)
- Electrified: Yes (from October 1955)
- Former names: Parkes Platform (1868–1893)

Passengers
- 2023: 548,750 (year); 1,503 (daily) (Sydney Trains, NSW TrainLink)

Services
Preceding station	Sydney Trains	Following station
Kingswood towards Emu Plains	North Shore & Western Line	St Marys towards Berowra
Location

Werrington railway station is a suburban railway station located on the Main Western line, serving the Sydney suburb of Werrington. It is served by Sydney Trains T1 Western Line services.

== History ==
Werrington station opened on 2 May 1868 as a private platform on the Main Western line for Henry Parkes named Parkes Platform. It opened for public use in 1878 and was renamed Werrington on 25 March 1893.

In June 2008, the station was upgraded with a new footbridge and lifts. It was fitted with solar panels at the same time, being the first CityRail station fitted. An upgrade to the commuter car park was completed in June 2010.

On 18 August 2011, a boy was hit by an express heading to city after dangerously crossing the tracks. The boy's leg and elbow were broken as well as sustaining serious injury. Transit officers arrived soon to call emergency services. The boy was then transported to The Children's Hospital at Westmead for treatment. It was revealed that the boy had survived by hiding in the 'lip' of the platform where the train had injured but not killed him.

The main array of 42 solar panels (7.35 kW capacity) appears to be no longer working since late 2012. As of August 2014, the system has not been repaired and no plans to fix it have been announced.

== Services ==
=== Platforms ===
Platform	Line	Stopping pattern	Notes
1	T1	services to North Sydney, Gordon, Hornsby & Berowra via Central & Chatswood	
2	T1	services to Penrith & Emu Plains	

=== Transport links ===
Busways operates two bus routes via Werrington station, under contract to Transport for NSW:

- 782: Penrith station to St Marys station
- 785: to Penrith station

Werrington is served by one NightRide route approximately one kilometre from Werrington station on the Great Western Highway:

- N70: Penrith station to Town Hall station

Western Sydney University runs a free Shuttle Bus every 10 minutes from the station to the Werrington North and South Campus.
