= Kingswood railway station, Sydney =

Railway station in Sydney, New South Wales, Australia

Kingswood
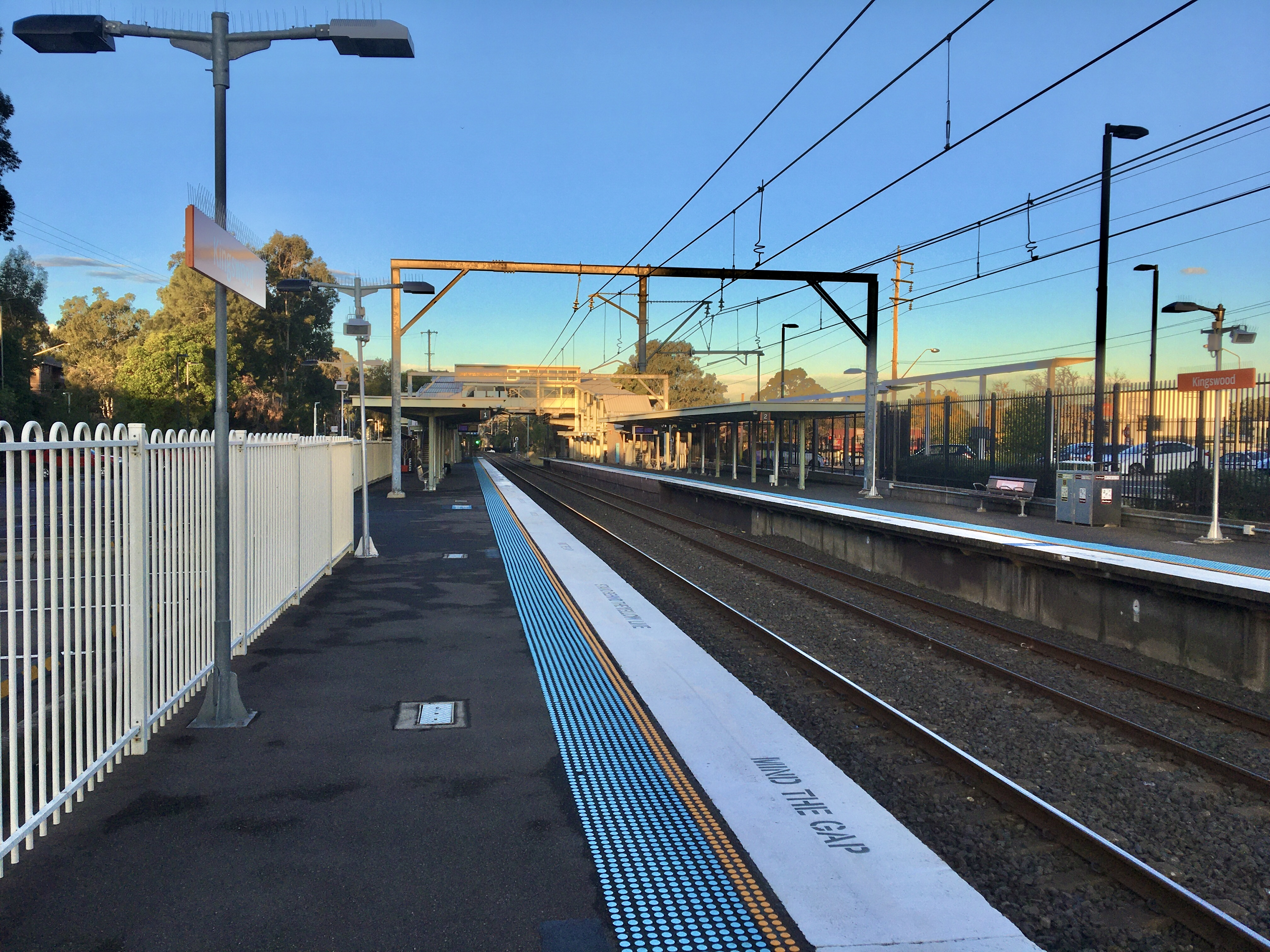
- Eastbound view from Platform 1 in June 2020

General information
- Location: Great Western Highway, Kingswood; Sydney, New South Wales; Australia
- Coordinates: 33°45′30″S 150°43′13″E
- Elevation: 54 metres (177 ft)
- Owner: Transport Asset Manager of NSW
- Operator: Sydney Trains
- Line: Main Western
- Distance: 52.70 km (32.75 mi) from Central
- Platforms: 2 (2 side)
- Tracks: 2
- Connections: Bus

Construction
- Structure type: Ground
- Accessible: Yes

Other information
- Status: Weekdays: Staffed: 6am to 7pm: Weekends and public holidays: Staffed: 8am to 4pm
- Station code: KWD
- Website: Transport for NSW

History
- Opened: 1 September 1887 (138 years ago)
- Electrified: Yes (from October 1955)
- Former names: Cross Roads (1887–1888)

Passengers
- 2025: 1,090,581 (year); 2,988 (daily) (Sydney Trains)
- Rank: 120

Services
Preceding station	Sydney Trains	Following station
Penrith towards Emu Plains	North Shore & Western Line	Werrington towards Berowra
Location

Kingswood railway station is a suburban railway station located on the Main Western line, serving the Sydney suburb of Kingswood. It is served by Sydney Trains T1 Western Line services.

== History ==
Kingswood station opened on 1 September 1887 as Cross Roads, being renamed Kingswood on 3 October 1888.

In January 2020 upgrade works to the station were complete which included two new lifts, new bathrooms and an upgraded footbridge.

== Services ==
=== Platforms ===
Platform	Line	Stopping pattern	Notes
1	T1	services to North Sydney, Gordon, Hornsby & Berowra via Central & Chatswood	
2	T1	services to Penrith & Emu Plains	

=== Transport links ===
Kingswood station is served by one NightRide route:

- N70: Penrith station to Town Hall station.
