= Ropes Creek railway line =

Closed railway line in Sydney, Australia

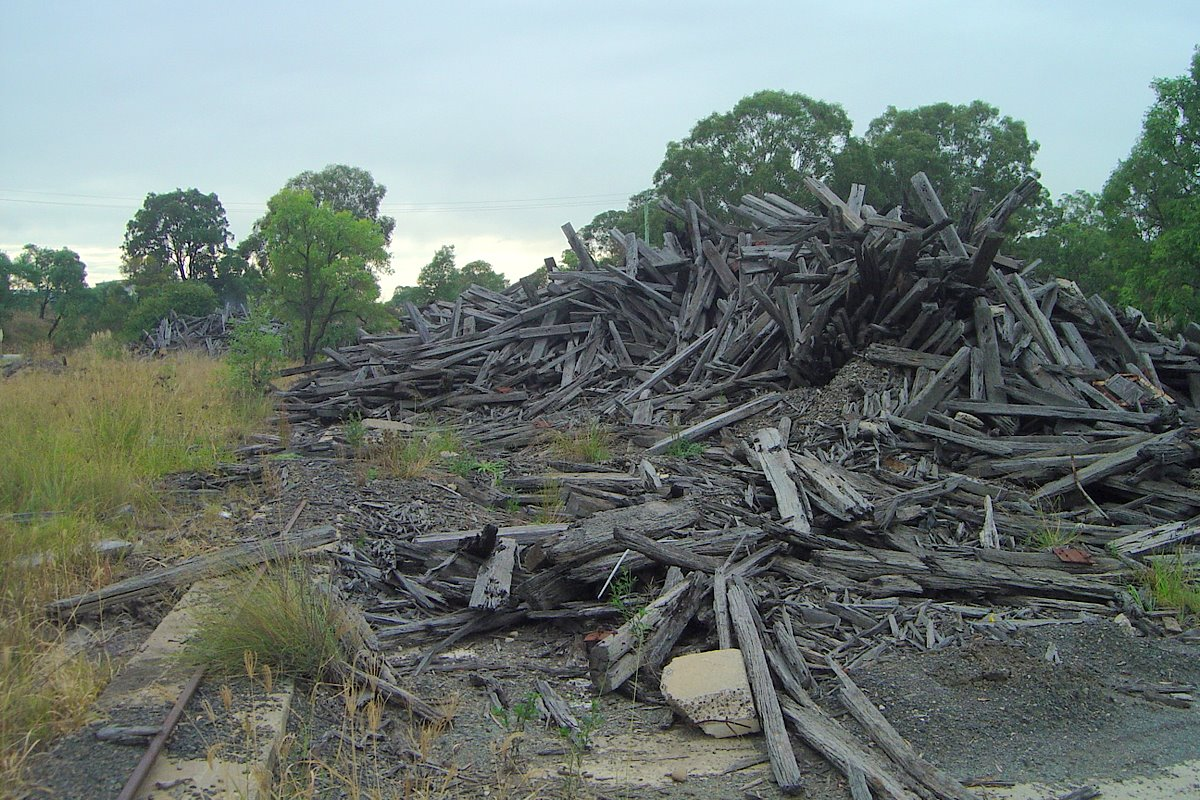
The line's wooden sleepers have been torn out and dumped in a pile.

Map

The Ropes Creek Line is a closed railway line in the western suburbs of Sydney, Australia.

== History ==
The Ropes Creek line was named after a nearby creek bearing the same name. It was built during World War II to transport munitions factory workers to and from St Marys. The line opened from St Marys to Dunheved on 1 March 1942 and Dunheved to Ropes Creek on 29 June 1942. When electrification arrived in the 1950s, there was a plan to electrify the Ropes Creek line. For the most part all the sidings in the Dunheved station area were electrified to enable the New South Wales Government Railways (NSWGR) to use electric locomotives of the 46 class to shunt trains without the need to change to diesel-electric or diesel-hydraulic locomotives.

While the line was being electrified, a new station named Cochrane was opened on 2 September 1957. Towards the end of train operation on the line, freight wagons were shunted into the Sims Metal plant which was about two kilometres from the junction with the Main Western line, and there was normally one passenger train in the morning and one in the afternoon, generally formed by a four-car single-deck suburban train, locally known as a red rattler.

The line was closed to passenger rail traffic in the early 1980s, following a downturn in passengers and munitions traffic, but remained open to freight traffic for Sims Metal. However, when that was switched to road traffic the line closed and lay idle for a number of years. On 22 March 1986, the line was officially closed forever, with an enthusiasts' special being the last train to traverse the section. Not long after that, the overhead power supply was removed.

Between Boxing Day 1990 and 8 January 1991, there was a major shut-down due to track work between St Mary's and Glenbrook stations, and the line was temporarily reopened as far as Dunheved to allow suburban trains that normally stabled at Penrith to be stabled in the four-track yard, and on the platform 2 or "down" track on the branch. At the completion of the track work, the line was once again closed.

Overhead wiring for approximately 10 car lengths was retained at the St Marys end of the branch, where it turned off the main western line, to provide a terminating point for trains used on "Y" Link services. With the abolition of "Y" link services to St Marys in 2005, the overhead wiring and associated components were subsequently removed.

At Dunheved railway station, a fenced-in compound was constructed on the down branch and down no. 1 siding, and two suburban carriages - Comeng S set motor car C3866 and Tangara car N5127 - were stored there for use by the NSW Fire Brigade for training purposes. The carriages and the compound didn't last long because local vandals destroyed both vehicles.

Rails on the branch were still in place in 1996 but by 2001, track lifting had commenced. The first part of the line to be removed was the area outside Sims Metal, to allow the extension of Christie Street between Dunheved Road and across South Creek. The next section of track, the Links Road level crossing, was covered with tar and concrete.

== Electrification timetables ==
=== 1 December 1957 ===
Down:

- 5:15 am. From North Sydney, all stations to Redfern, then Ashfield and all stations to Ropes Creek (except Rookwood).
- 5:28 am. From North Sydney, all stations to Redfern, then Burwood and all stations to Ropes Creek (except Rookwood).
- 5:45 am. From Granville, all stations to Ropes Creek.
- 7:33 am. From St Marys, all stations to Ropes Creek (Dunheved, Cochrane & Ropes Creek).
- 2:00 pm. From Hornsby, all to Redfern, the Burwood and all stations to Ropes Creek (except Rookwood).

Up:

- 6:55 am. From Ropes Creek, all station to Lidcombe, then Strathfield, Burwood, Redfern, and all stations to Gordon.
- 7:07 am. From Ropes Creek, all stations to Lidcombe, then Strathfield, Redfern, and all stations to North Sydney.
- 4:10 pm. From Ropes Creek, all stations to Ashfield (except Rookwood), then Redfern, all stations to North Sydney, then Artarmon, and all stations to Hornsby.
- 4:16 pm. From Ropes Creek, all stations to Burwood (except Rookwood), then Redfern, all stations to North Sydney, then Artarmon, and all stations to Hornsby.
- 5:18 pm. From Ropes Creek, Cochrane, Dunheved & St Marys only.

== 21st century ==
The formerly electrified line, which boasted three stations (Dunheved, Cochrane and Ropes Creek), has been truncated at the Sims Metal recycling facility on Christie Street, Dunheved, and all track and overhead wiring beyond that point has been removed.

Other than the island platform, the only remnants of Dunheved station are the footbridge, including the steps leading to the island platform, with the remains of an electrical hut located under the stairs. A large hole in the platform with a few metal pulleys is the only remaining evidence that a signal box was located within the station building.

In April 2011, the stairs were removed and the railings on the footbridge made good. The stairs had been the standard pattern pre-cast concrete on steel framework, and had weathered to the point where the concrete was crumbling. The old platform retains its former appearance and there is a park on its northern side. At one stage, the rail formation and yard area at the western end of Dunheved station were used by a local company for the storage of concrete pipes.

A satellite view of the line north of Links Rd (Dunheved) on NSWRail Maps 22 April 2008 showed that urban sprawl had meant that the site of Cochrane Railway Station had disappeared under Ropes Crossing Boulevard. Ropes Creek railway station was under threat of extinction due to earthworks associated with the construction of local roads, and the expansion of the new suburb of Ropes Crossing was well under way.

At 8 June 2009, Ropes Creek station platform has been heavily excavated and shortened to approximately 50 m, with only the area containing the overhead footbridge and platform buildings remaining and fenced off from public access. This has been designated a heritage area. Within this fenced off area, signals (both semaphore and colour light) along with other various pieces of track-side equipment was dumped in piles with no regard to their heritage importance. A large sign on the fence indicated that the station would be part of a proposed "Cultural Park".

During 2014, the remnants of the station were converted to a local park for Ropes Crossing residents, with the remaining platform, overhead beams, rail tracks and old machinery featured as design elements. The park also displays two reproduction station signs on the platform reading "Ropes Creek Station".

Owing to the Campbelltown to St Marys (Cumberland Line) trains now operating along Richmond railway line towards Richmond or Schofields, and the abolition of The River (the St Marys to Wyong service), there is now no requirement for the electrification of the storage sidings on the former Ropes Creek Line. Overhead wiring between the points on the Up Main to the Up Storage Sidings and the electric train stop boards has been removed. The sidings are now used for the storage of track machines during rail shut-downs or whenever scrapped rolling stock is delivered to the Sims Metal recycling plant.

Early stage planning for Outer Sydney Orbital, a transport corridor travelling from Marsden Park, New South Wales in the north, to Menangle, New South Wales in the south, clearly shows a rail line turning to pass through the vicinity of the Dunheved railway station, possibly due to future shipping requirements of the area to relieve current road transport. The line then returns to the main corridor, and does not continue to Ropes Crossing.

== Station buildings ==
The station buildings along the line were built from different materials.

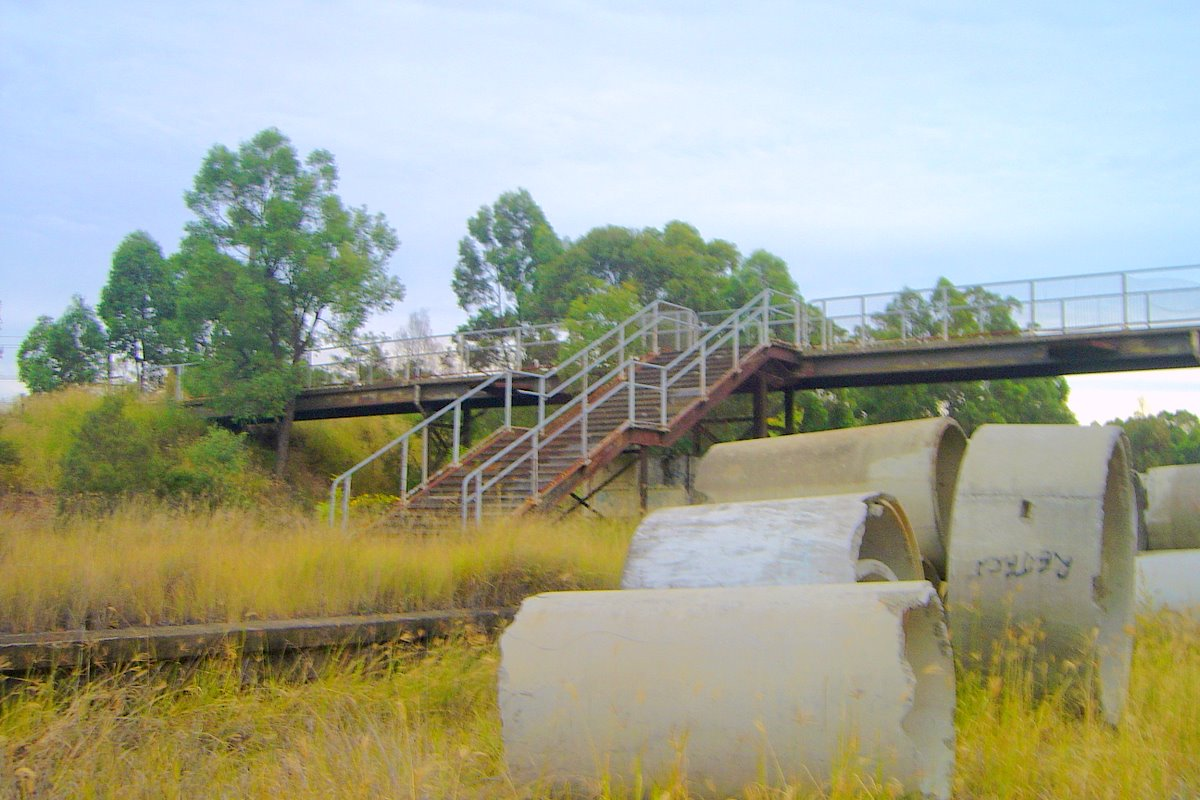
The remains of Dunheved station in 2006

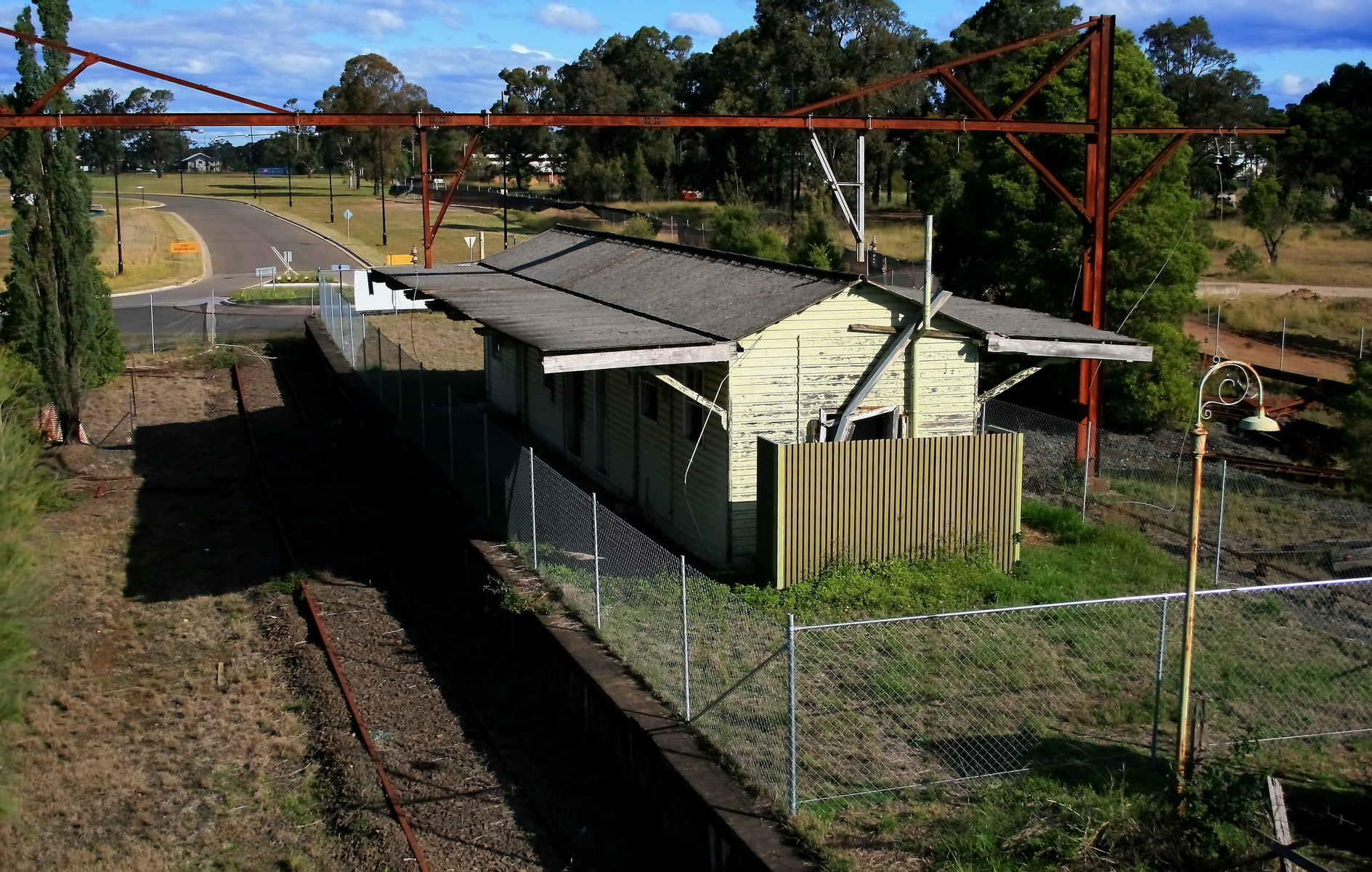
Ropes Creek station in June 2009

- Dunheved station was a weatherboard building in which the station master's office/booking office, waiting room and store room was destroyed when vandals broke in and set it on fire on the evening of 20 November 1983. It had a 32 lever frame to operate signals and points.
- Cochrane station was classed as unattended with no booking office facilities and a roadway bridge over the middle of the station. It had a waiting room on platform 1 (up branch) and awnings over both platforms.
- Ropes Creek station was of weatherboard construction, commonly used at the time by the NSWGR. It had a 40 lever frame to operate signals and points. It had a waiting room and toilet facilities. At the foot of the stairs, a small weatherboard structure was provided for station staff to stand in while tickets were collected. In June 2011, the station building was destroyed by fire.

There is now a notice at the southern end of the site indicating that an historical centre may be erected.

== See also ==
- Holsworthy railway line
