= Orchard Hills, New South Wales =

Orchard Hills
- Suburb
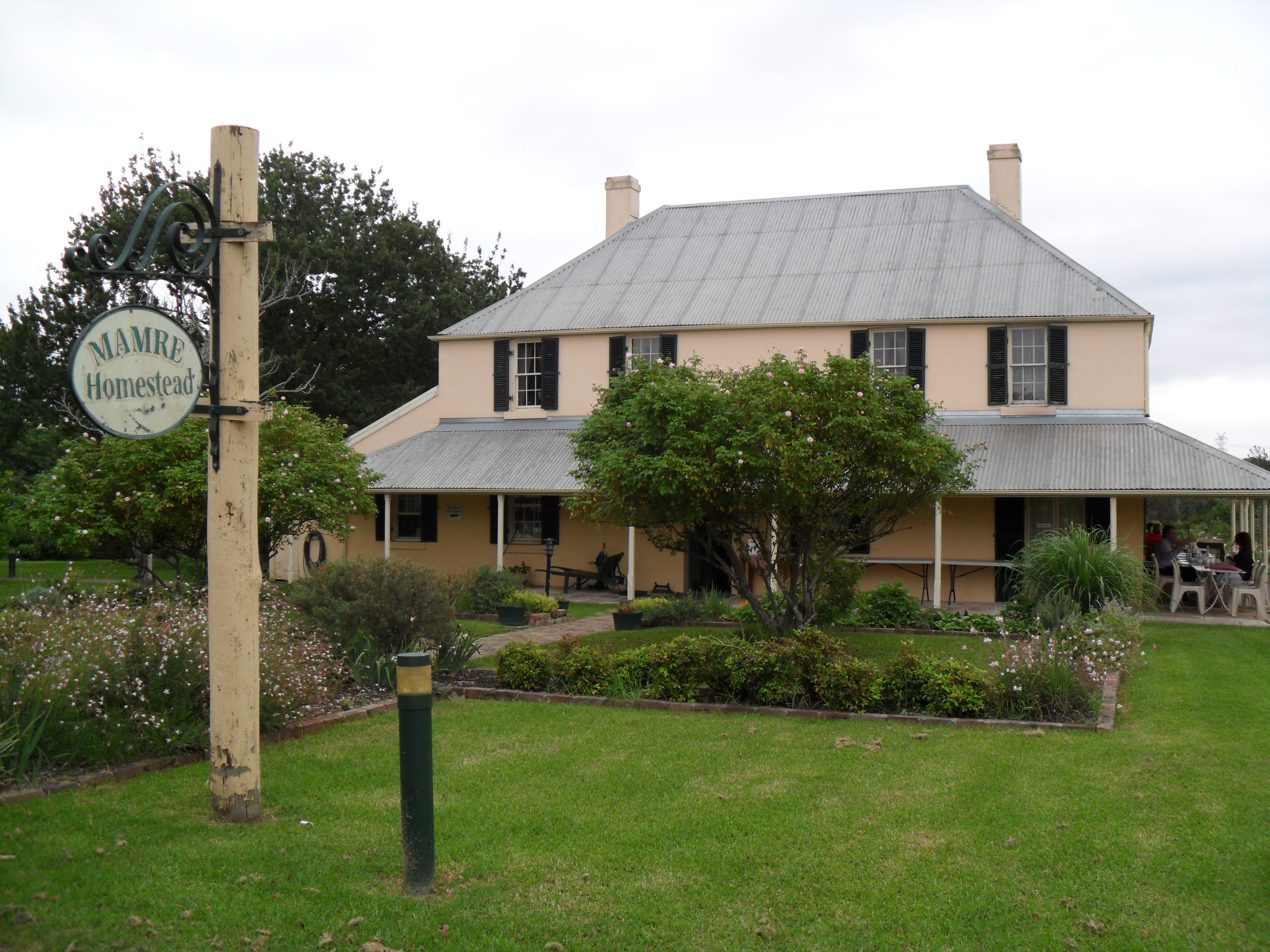
- Mamre Homestead

- Interactive map of Orchard Hills
- Country: Australia
- State: New South Wales
- City: Sydney
- LGA: Penrith City Council
- Location: 49 km (30 mi) west of Sydney CBD
- Established: 1806

Government
  - State electorates: Badgerys Creek; Londonderry
  - Federal divisions: Lindsay; McMahon
- Elevation: 89 m (292 ft)

Population
  - Total: 1,798 (2021 census)
- Postcode: 2748
Suburbs around Orchard Hills
South Penrith	Kingswood	St Marys
Glenmore Park	Orchard Hills	St Clair
Mulgoa	Luddenham	Erskine Park

Orchard Hills is a suburb of Sydney, in the state of New South Wales, Australia 49 kilometres west of the Sydney central business district, in the local government area of the City of Penrith. It is part of the Greater Western Sydney region.

== History ==
Orchard Hills takes its name from the orchards located on the area's undulating hills at the turn of the 20th century. In 1806, Governor Philip King granted 600 acres (2.4 km^{2}) in what is now Orchard Hills to Mary Putland, the daughter of the incoming governor, William Bligh. She named the property Frogmore.

In c. 1830 Rev. Samuel Marsden built Mamre, a two-storey Colonial Georgian homestead on the west side of what is now Mamre Road. The homestead was constructed of sandstone and is listed on the New South Wales State Heritage Register and the local government heritage register. It is now used as a function centre and is open for guided tours.

Adjoining the Frogmore Estate was the York Estate, originally owned by the York family. When it was subdivided in the late 1880s, the land was mainly sold for orchards and vineyards. By the early 1900s a rural community had established in the area and a village developed.

The Mount Hope Methodist Church was built in 1904 and the York Estate Public School was built in 1910. Until this time the area had no consistent name being known by different people as Frogmore, York and Mount Hope. A public meeting was called in October 1910 at the new school to choose a name and Orchard Hills won the day.

== Description ==
Orchard Hills is located in the centre of the City of Penrith. Sydney Water's supply pipeline is its southern boundary line, while the suburbs of St Clair and Erskine Park border the suburb to the east. Kingswood and Claremont Meadows are northern neighbours and Glenmore Park, South Penrith and the rural areas of Wallacia and Mulgoa comprise the western boundary. Orchard Hills has a predominantly rural character with undulating hills and scenic vistas. Its landscape is mainly overlaid with orchards and grapevines with some housing development in recent years. This suburb epitomizes the City of Penrith's vision of a region with a harmony of urban and rural qualities.

== Heritage listings ==
Orchard Hills has a number of heritage-listed sites, including:

- Mamre Road: Mamre

== Transport ==
In June 2020, a station at Orchard Hills on the Western Sydney Airport line due to be completed in 2026, was confirmed.

== Climate ==
Climate data for Orchard Hills Treatment Works
Month	Jan	Feb	Mar	Apr	May	Jun	Jul	Aug	Sep	Oct	Nov	Dec	Year
Record high °C (°F)	42.0 (107.6)	42.5 (108.5)	40.4 (104.7)	34.6 (94.3)	27.4 (81.3)	25.0 (77.0)	28.0 (82.4)	30.6 (87.1)	35.2 (95.4)	40.0 (104.0)	42.5 (108.5)	40.5 (104.9)	42.5 (108.5)
Mean daily maximum °C (°F)	28.3 (82.9)	27.8 (82.0)	26.5 (79.7)	23.8 (74.8)	20.4 (68.7)	17.3 (63.1)	17.2 (63.0)	18.9 (66.0)	21.8 (71.2)	23.9 (75.0)	25.8 (78.4)	28.5 (83.3)	28.5 (83.3)
Mean daily minimum °C (°F)	16.9 (62.4)	17.4 (63.3)	16.0 (60.8)	13.0 (55.4)	9.6 (49.3)	7.0 (44.6)	5.3 (41.5)	5.9 (42.6)	8.7 (47.7)	11.1 (52.0)	13.2 (55.8)	15.5 (59.9)	11.6 (52.9)
Record low °C (°F)	6.5 (43.7)	11.1 (52.0)	8.0 (46.4)	1.6 (34.9)	1.8 (35.2)	−1.1 (30.0)	−1.5 (29.3)	−1.0 (30.2)	1.5 (34.7)	3.9 (39.0)	1.0 (33.8)	5.0 (41.0)	−1.5 (29.3)
Average precipitation mm (inches)	99.8 (3.93)	113.2 (4.46)	106.6 (4.20)	67.1 (2.64)	54.7 (2.15)	54.2 (2.13)	41.0 (1.61)	40.1 (1.58)	36.8 (1.45)	56.7 (2.23)	80.1 (3.15)	73.4 (2.89)	826.6 (32.54)
Average precipitation days (≥ 0.1 mm)	11.0	11.0	11.0	8.0	7.5	7.8	6.5	5.9	6.9	9.0	10.3	9.4	104.3
