= Kingswood, New South Wales =

Kingswood
- Suburb
- Interactive map of Kingswood
- Country: Australia
- State: New South Wales
- City: Sydney
- LGA: City of Penrith
- Location: 52 km (32 mi) west of Sydney CBD
- Established: 1855

Government
  - State electorate: Penrith, Londonderry
  - Federal division: Lindsay

Area
  - Total: 6.58 km^{2} (2.54 sq mi)
- Elevation: 53 m (174 ft)

Population
  - Total: 10,633 (2021 census)
  - Density: 1,616.0/km^{2} (4,185/sq mi)
- Postcode: 2747
Suburbs around Kingswood
Penrith	Cambridge Park	Werrington
Penrith	Kingswood	Claremont Meadows
South Penrith	Orchard Hills	Orchard Hills

Kingswood is a suburb in western Sydney, in the state of New South Wales in Australia. 52 kilometres (32 mi) west of the Sydney central business district, in the local government area of the City of Penrith. There are various other locations within the state of New South Wales that are also called Kingswood, and is often confused with the nearby suburb of Kingswood Park.

== History ==
Kingswood was named after the family of Governor Philip Gidley King, who owned land in the area which was originally heavily forested. In 1881, the area was known as Crossroads for the intersection of the Great Western Highway and The Northern Road (now Parker Street). The name was changed to Kingswood on 2 August 1887. Cross Roads West Post Office opened on 20 April 1887 and was renamed Kingswood in August 1887.

The land was used for farming and subdivision began after the railway came through in 1862, although the Kingswood siding did not open until 1887.

The NSW State Archives and Reading Room (formerly known as Western Sydney Records Repository), where NSW public sector bodies' records are stored, is located on O'Connell Street, Kingswood.

== Demographics ==
According to the 2021 census of population, there were 10,633 people in Kingswood.

- Aboriginal and Torres Strait Islander people made up 5.3% of the population.
- 61.2% of people were born in Australia. The next most common countries of birth were India 5.9%, Philippines 2.6%, England 2.2%, New Zealand 1.9% and Nepal 1.4%.
- 63.4% of people spoke only English at home. Other languages spoken at home included Punjabi 2.9%, Nepali 2.1%, Malayalam 1.7%, Mandarin 1.5% and Arabic 1.4%.
- Their median age was 34 years, 4 years younger than the national median of 38. Children aged under 15 years made up 20.1% of the population (18.2% nationally) and people aged 65 years and over made up 12.8% of the population (17.2% nationally).
- The most common responses for religion were No Religion 30.0%, Catholic 20.9% and Anglican 10.4%.

== Transport ==
Kingswood railway station is on the Main Western railway line.

== Schools ==
Government

- Kingswood Public School - primary school
- Kingswood South Public School - primary school
- Kingswood High School

Catholic

- St. Josephs Primary School

Private

- St Dominics College run by the Christian Brothers

== Tertiary education ==
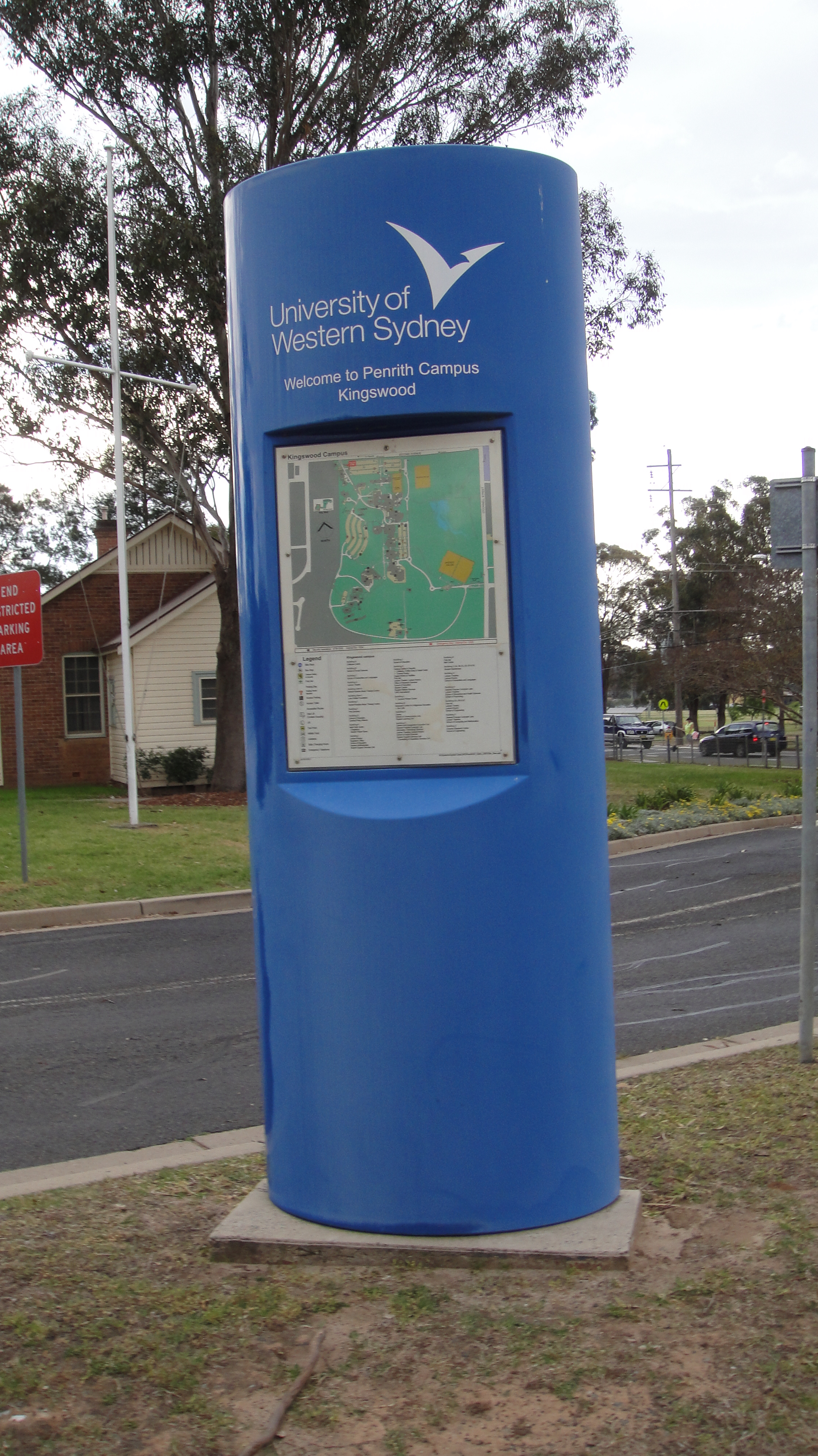
An information panel welcoming students to the University of Western Sydney's Kingswood campus.

- Western Sydney University's Penrith campus is divided across the suburbs of Kingswood and Werrington. The university is accessible from both Werrington and Kingswood railway stations.
- The Nepean College of TAFE, Kingswood Campus is also located in Kingswood.
- Institute of Applied Technology, a joint venture between TAFE, Western Sydney University, and several other institutions.

== Governance ==
At a local government level, Kingswood is part Penrith City Council, with the suburb divided into all three wards. At the state level, it is part of the Electoral district of Penrith, represented by the Labor Party's Karen McKeown. Federally, it is part of the Division of Lindsay, represented by Liberal Party Melissa McIntosh.

== Churches ==
In 1897, four blocks of Crown land were given to the residents of Kingswood for a Church and Cemetery (later not required due to the dedication of Penrith General Cemetery). The Church was completed in 1898, the contractor was Jack Melville with ironwork provided by local blacksmith James Wainwright. The western porch was added later. Opened in 1898, the Church was not consecrated until 1959. A new Sunday school hall was completed in 1958 (now demolished).

== Archival Holdings ==
- NRS 15051, Photographic Collection. Item [1038] Kingswood High School (01/01/1970 - 31/12/1970). State Archives and Records Authority of New South Wales
- NRS 3829, School Files. State Archives and Records Authority of New South Wales
