= Log Cabin railway station =

Former railway station in Sydney, Australia

Log Cabin

General information
- Location: Great Western Highway, Penrith, New South Wales; Australia
- Coordinates: 33°44′48″S 150°40′59″E
- Operator: Department of Railways
- Line: Main Western
- Distance: 56.327 kilometres (35.000 mi) from Central
- Platforms: 2 (2 side)
- Tracks: 2

Construction
- Structure type: Ground

Other information
- Status: Demolished

History
- Opened: 6 July 1940
- Closed: September 1950

Services
Preceding station	Former services	Following station
Emu Plains towards Bourke	Main Western Line	Penrith towards Sydney
Location

Log Cabin railway station was a railway station located on the Main Western line, serving the adjacent Log Cabin Hotel in Penrith, New South Wales. The station was served by special passenger services for only a decade, opening in 1940 and closing in 1950.

== History ==
A station on the western bank of the Nepean River was originally proposed by the Department of Railways in 1937, however none was ever built. In May 1940, a private proposal for a station on the immediate eastern bank was approved, allowing the public and patrons of the Log Cabin Hotel located opposite the railway, easier access from the city. Log Cabin station was opened on 6 July 1940, close to the site where the first successful crossing of the Blue Mountains began.

The opening of the station was celebrated with a local gala day and night. Events such as a tennis exhibition, a dog show by the Sydney Canine Society, a barbeque, a rowing event and a cabaret show were all included in the gala.

The station was mainly served by special services from Central. As well as this, clubs and parties to the Log Cabin Hotel were able to apply to the tourist bureau for extra services when necessary.

A 1949 proposal by Penrith Council to rename the station Log Cabin, Nepean River was rejected by the Commissioner of Railways on the grounds that it would cause confusion due to the use of the name 'Nepean' elsewhere. The Council also proposed incorporating Log Cabin into the regular suburban network by extending weekend suburban services from Penrith to terminate at Log Cabin instead, which was also rejected due to the cost of building signal and yard facilities and upgrading existing station facilities.

The station closed in September 1950 and was subsequently demolished, with no remains now extant.

== Description ==
Log Cabin station consisted of two side platforms, located close to the Victoria Bridge and adjacent railway bridge crossing over the Nepean River. The platforms were around 12 metres long and 2.5 metres wide and were constructed at a low cost, out of steel frames from old rail with timber planks from old rail sleepers on top. Although the station opened in July 1940, only one platform was operational at this time, with both constructed and open by the start of 1941.
