= Agnes Banks =

- Suburb
- Interactive map of Agnes Banks
- Coordinates: 33°36′55″S 150°42′58″E
- Country: Australia
- State: New South Wales
- City: Sydney
- LGAs: City of Penrith; City of Hawkesbury
- Location: 65 km (40 mi) from Sydney CBD

Government
  - State electorates: Londonderry; Hawkesbury
  - Federal division: Macquarie
- Elevation: 24 m (79 ft)

Population
  - Total: 996 (2021 census)
- Postcode: 2753
Suburbs around Agnes Banks
Grose Wold	Richmond	Hobartville
Yarramundi	Agnes Banks	Londonderry
Yarramundi	Castlereagh	Cranebrook

Agnes Banks is a suburb of Sydney, in the state of New South Wales, Australia. Agnes Banks is 68 kilometres (42 mi) north-west of the Sydney central business district, in the local government areas of the City of Penrith and City of Hawkesbury. It is part of the Greater Western Sydney region.

Agnes Banks is connected to Penrith by Castlereagh Road which runs alongside the Nepean River between Richmond and Penrith. Natural woodlands and sandy deposits make up the higher landscape of this suburb. Agnes Banks is a rural outpost of the City of Penrith which has kept its intrinsic agricultural value and rural lifestyle.

== History ==
This area was settled as early as 1803 by Charles Palmer. He was the first man to receive the free land grants in 1803; he and his wife Mary Anne built the first Farm Slab House the same year. The 3 chimneys still stand near the corner of Castlereagh Rd and Springwood Rd. The town here was once known as 'Little Richmond'. In 1804 Andrew Thompson was given a grant which he named Agnes Bank after his mother.

== Heritage listings ==
Agnes Banks has a number of heritage-listed sites, including:

- Rickards Avenue: Agnes Banks Natural Area

== Weather record ==
On 4 January 2020, a heat logger registered a temperature of 51.5 °C (124.7 °F) in the suburb, which was on the same day when Penrith recorded an official temperature of 48.9 °C (120.0 °F).

== Demographics ==
According to the 2021 census, there were 996 residents in Agnes Banks. 82.8% of residents were born in Australia. The other most common countries of birth were England 2.4%, Malta 2.1% and New Zealand 1.5%. 87.8% of residents spoke only English at home. Other languages spoken at home included Maltese 2.0%, Greek 1.3% and Italian 0.6%. The most common responses for religious affiliation were Catholic 34.5%, No Religion 28.7% and Anglican 17.3%.
