= Torin Building =

Historic site in Penrith, New South Wales

- Location within Sydney Location within Australia
- 33°44′38″S 150°42′10″E
- Location: 26 Coombes Drive, Penrith, City of Penrith, New South Wales, Australia

History
- Built: 1975–1976

Site notes
- Architect: Marcel Breuer (with Harry Seidler as onsite supervisor)

New South Wales Heritage Register
- Official name: Torin Building; Former Torin Corporation Building; Breuer Building
- Type: State heritage (built)
- Designated: 15 May 2009
- Reference no.: 1796
- Type: Factory/Plant
- Category: Manufacturing and Processing

Torin Building is a heritage-listed former factory, now converted to factory and office space. It is located at 26 Coombes Drive in the western Sydney suburb of Penrith in the City of Penrith local government area of New South Wales, Australia. It was designed by Marcel Breuer (with Harry Seidler as onsite supervisor) and built from 1975 to 1976. It is also known as the Former Torin Corporation Building and Breuer Building. It was added to the New South Wales State Heritage Register on 15 May 2009.

== History ==
Marcel Breuer was born in Hungary in 1902. He studied under Walter Gropius at the Bauhaus in Weimar where he also came into contact with a number of other significant figures in design and architecture such as Le Corbusier. These associations influenced Breuer in his professional life for many years. In 1924 Breuer became Director of the Bauhaus furniture workshop and also took on a teaching role there. It was while he was working at the Bauhaus that Breuer developed his ground breaking Wassily and Cesca tubular steel chair designs. In 1928 Breuer set up an architecture and interior design practise in Berlin. When Hitler became Chancellor of Germany in 1933, Breuer moved to London where he continued to practise as an internationally noted architect and designer.

In 1937 on the invitation of Walter Gropius, then Chairman of the Faculty of Architecture at Harvard, Breuer took up an Associate Professorship at that university. He also went into partnership with Gropius and began a distinguished career in America. During the 1940s Breuer's American work was primarily the design of domestic residences and he was thought to have revolutionised the design of American houses. Geller House I was designed in 1945 and was the first of Breuer's binuclear houses where living and sleeping accommodation was separated in two wings roofed with one of his distinctive butterfly roofs that quickly became an icon of modernist design all over the world.

In 1952 the design of the UNESCO building in Paris marked Breuer's first significant foray into the design of international public buildings. In this building Breuer began his use of concrete as a favoured construction material. It was also a turning point in his adoption of a distinctively sculptural approach to architectural form which was developed over the years to his retirement in 1976 and expressed in buildings such as the Whitney Museum of American Art, New York and St Francis de Sales Church, Muskegon, Michigan. Through works such as these Breuer built his reputation as the most significant "form giver" of the 20th century. As Seidler noted in an obituary published in the Architecture Bulletin in 1981 "There can be no doubt that Marcel Breuer was a great man, the last and one of the greatest of those few men who shaped modern architecture and modern design after World War I."

Breuer's long-term association with the Torrington Corporation (later renamed Torin Corporation) began in 1952 when he designed the Technical Centre at the corporation's factory in Canada. Between 1952 and 1976, Breuer designed nine factory and office buildings for the Torin Corporation. The last was constructed in 1976 in Penrith, NSW. This building's design was a result of the evolution and refinement of technical and visual experience of the Torin buildings preceding it. A tenth Torin building was designed and constructed by Breuer's practise after he retired in 1976.

The Torin building in Penrith was designed by Breuer and his partner, Herbert Beckhard from their offices in New York. The administration of the project during construction was taken on by the office of Harry Seidler and Associates in Sydney. Seidler had worked for Breuer in 1946–1948. In 1973 there had been an agreement signed between Harry Seidler and Associates and the Commonwealth of Australia for an Australian Embassy in Paris, Seidler said that 'it was natural for me to ask Breuer's Paris office to be our 'architecte d'operation'. It meant re-establishing a working relationship with him after many years. The ground breaking ceremony took place on 6 January 1975.

== Description ==
The Torin Corporation factory at Penrith was built within an industrial estate to the north of the town centre. It is located on the corner of Coombes Drive and Coombes Drive South. Car access was from Coombes Drive and trucking access to the large storage area behind the factory building was from Coombes Drive South.

Buildings in the area are widely spaced and there are no special elements that would affect the outlook or disposition of the building on the site. The main elevation is bold in its architectural composition consisting of almost windowless cuboid forms of rough-textured concrete block and precast concrete. It is an exemplary late Twentieth Century International Modern Style industrial building, is a powerful work, a fully resolved in three dimensional architectural expression which is monumental in its bold geometry. The plan and mass of the building was the outcome of its integrated handling system consisting of storage, retrieval and reassembling.

The Torin Corporation manufactured a wide range of blower units and axial and centrifugal impellers for the heating, ventilation and air conditioning industry. Many of the products were also manufactured in Torin's ten other factories throughout the world. In these locations it had been recognised that, as labor costs rose, the materials handling activity became an important candidate for automation. Therefore, an integrated handling system was developed that dictated the basic shape of the 3,800-square-metre (41,000 sq ft) Penrith factory. The building consisted of three basic components; a high rise storage unit containing the integrated handling system; a basic two-floor structure which contains manufacturing, assembly and office areas, as well as a well equipped laboratory for airflow measurement and two service cores three storeys high, but of the same total height as the two manufacturing storeys. These cores project from the facade free of the manufacturing space. One module provided an entrance for plant employees and support facilities: toilets, locker rooms and stairs. The other contained an entrance for visitors and office personnel, and mechanical space, toilets and stairs.

Access to the high rise storage unit was provided at both manufacturing levels. The multitude of components required in the manufacturing process were moved in and out of the 20-metre high storage system by a single rail-guided vehicle as the various manufacturing operations were performed.

Because processing lines were adjacent to container racking on both floors, load distances were very short. Once positioned in a pick-up station, loads could be moved by a storage vehicle for weight check and storage in less than a quarter of the time expected of a conventional fork-lift truck. Storage was accessible only to a special vehicle. This ensured parts, quantity and location integrity and eliminated the shutdown usually required for the taking of inventory.

=== Materials and structural system ===
All walls of the complete steel framed structure, except the north–south walls are of concrete block, cavity wall construction, the outer skin consisting of split-face block. Office areas and the lower floor manufacturing areas included precast concrete window units similar to those first developed by the architects for the Torin Technical Centre in Torrington, Connecticut, US in 1971. These units in all cases faced north and were designed to provide adequate sun shade.

North and south walls of the high rise storage unit were clad in corrugated metal panels, painted white to contrast with the rough textured, warm grey, split block used elsewhere. A further use of this corrugated metal was in combination with the window wall treatment of the two entrances to the building. The sloping form of the northern walls of the service cores were a departure from the horizontal/vertical lines of the building, giving dynamic lines to the composition of the building forms.

=== Condition ===
As at 21 October 2008, The condition of the fabric is excellent. The archaeological potential of the site is unknown. The Torin building is a highly intact example of a small scale industrial building designed by Marcel Breuer in the Late Twentieth Century International style. The architectural elements and sculptural aspects of the external facade are still in place and the internal and external fittings remain in situ.

It is a rare and relatively intact example of a Late Twentieth-Century International style industrial building in Sydney.

== Heritage listing ==
As at 7 July 2009, the former Torin building is of State heritage significance as a rare and intact example of a Late Twentieth Century Modernist style industrial building designed by internationally acclaimed master architect Marcel Breuer. It is the only Marcel Breuer building in NSW and Australia and is one of a suite of buildings specifically designed for the Torin Corporation located throughout Europe, Canada and the United States. The Torin building in Penrith was the last of 9 buildings designed for the Torin Corporation by Marcel Breuer and the form and design inclusions of this building had evolved from the visual and technical experience of the Torin Corporation buildings preceding it. The Torin building in Coombes Drive Penrith differs from the early Torin Corporation buildings which were more classically gridded modernist work. The Australian example is a strong expression of the powerful sculptural mode of Breuer's later career.

Marcel Breuer gained a stellar international reputation early in his career while studying and teaching at the Bauhaus in Dessau in the 1920s. It was here that he designed the famous Wassily chair among other achievements. He later joined the also famous Walter Gropius in partnership and continued to develop his architecture which by the later years "illustrat[ed] the cubist sensibility of this sculptor architect " and gained him the reputation as "one of the most important form givers of our time".

The Torin building in Penrith is a fine example of Breuer's Torin Corporation architecture and the principles of his modernist design work where form is primarily determined by function. Like other of the Torin Corporation's small scale industrial buildings, the Torin building in Penrith is a good example of the way in which Breuer's design raised his buildings to a new modernist aesthetic level which ensured there was economy in plan form, bold architonic expression and the repetition of industrial elements as either extruded sections or pre-cast elements. The architectural elements and sculptural aspects of the external facade are still in place and the internal and external fittings remain in situ.

Torin Building was listed on the New South Wales State Heritage Register on 15 May 2009 having satisfied the following criteria.

The place is important in demonstrating the course, or pattern, of cultural or natural history in New South Wales.

The Torin building, designed in 1975, is one of the later buildings in the distinctive career of internationally renowned architect Marcel Breuer whose work is critically acclaimed as part of the Twentieth Century International style of architecture. The Torin building in Penrith is one of a suite of buildings throughout Canada, Europe and US constructed for the Torin Corporation. It demonstrates a late stage in the evolution of the design requirements for such small scale industrial buildings in an economic context of cost saving through automation . The distinctive form of this building is influenced by the functional requirements of the factory to incorporate an automated, integrated handling system (contained in the tower component of the building), the two storey manufacture, assembly, office and laboratory component and the two service cores (one an entry one housing services) which project form the facade.

The place has a strong or special association with a person, or group of persons, of importance of cultural or natural history of New South Wales's history.

The former Torin Building is of State heritage significance as it is an important work by internationally renowned master architect Marcel Breuer with the association with Herbert Beckhard. Breuer and Beckhard were architects for the Torin Corporation of the US. Breuer and Beckhard designed nine buildings for the Torin Corporation located in the US, France, Canada, Belgium and England. Breuer built his reputation as a stellar international architect through his work at the Bauhause in the 1920s where he designed the famous Wasilli and Cesa chairs, through his working association with Walter Gropius in Europe and America and his acclaimed industrial, civic and residential architectural design including the UNESCO building in Paris and the Whittney Museum in New York. Breuer was noted as "one of the last true functionalist architects" whose designs raised small scale industrial architecture to a new modernist aesthetic level.

The place is important in demonstrating aesthetic characteristics and/or a high degree of creative or technical achievement in New South Wales.

The Torin Building demonstrates a high level of creative and technical achievement. Its sculptural form, plan and massing is determined by an integrated and automated handling system of storage, retrieval and reassembly. It contains design elements, a concern with texture and geometry which are typical of the Breuer Torin buildings. These features include the use of structural steel frame clad in metal sheet split face concrete block, projecting blade walls and precast concrete window frames with integrated sun shading.

The Torin building is an aesthetically distinctive as a fine example of Late Twentieth Century Modernist industrial architecture The design demonstrates an economy in plan form, bold architectonic expression and the repetition of industrial elements either as extruded sections or precast elements.

The place has potential to yield information that will contribute to an understanding of the cultural or natural history of New South Wales.

The former Torin building has heritage significance at a State level as a resource for understanding the design intent, detailing, the choice of construction materials and techniques of this important international architect in the Australian context.

The place possesses uncommon, rare or endangered aspects of the cultural or natural history of New South Wales.

The former Torin building is a rare and intact example of Late 20th Century International style industrial architecture designed by master architect Marcel Bruer who worked with Walter Gropius and the Bauerhaus and gave us lauded design items such as the Wassily and Cesca Chair and who later in his career designed buildings of critical acclaim such as the Whittney Museum, New York and the UNESCO building in Paris. It is the only building in Australia designed by Breuer and one of the few buildings in Australia designed by an internationally renowned master architect. It features exceptionally fine concrete block and precast concrete sun control detailing protecting windows at ground level.

The place is important in demonstrating the principal characteristics of a class of cultural or natural places/environments in New South Wales.

The Torin building is a fine example of Marcel Breuer's Torin Corporation design work. Being the last of these buildings designed this building incorporates technical and visual elements that had evolved over the 14 years of Breuers design for the company. While it is the only Breuer designed building in Australia it is one of a group of 9 Breuer designed Torin Corporation buildings located throughout Europe, US and Canada. It incorporates ideas and media such as the use of split face concrete cladding and precast windows with integrated sun shading which are of concern to Breuer in his Torin buildings as well as other buildings in his portfolio.

== See also ==
- List of Marcel Breuer buildings
