= Emu Plains Underbridge =

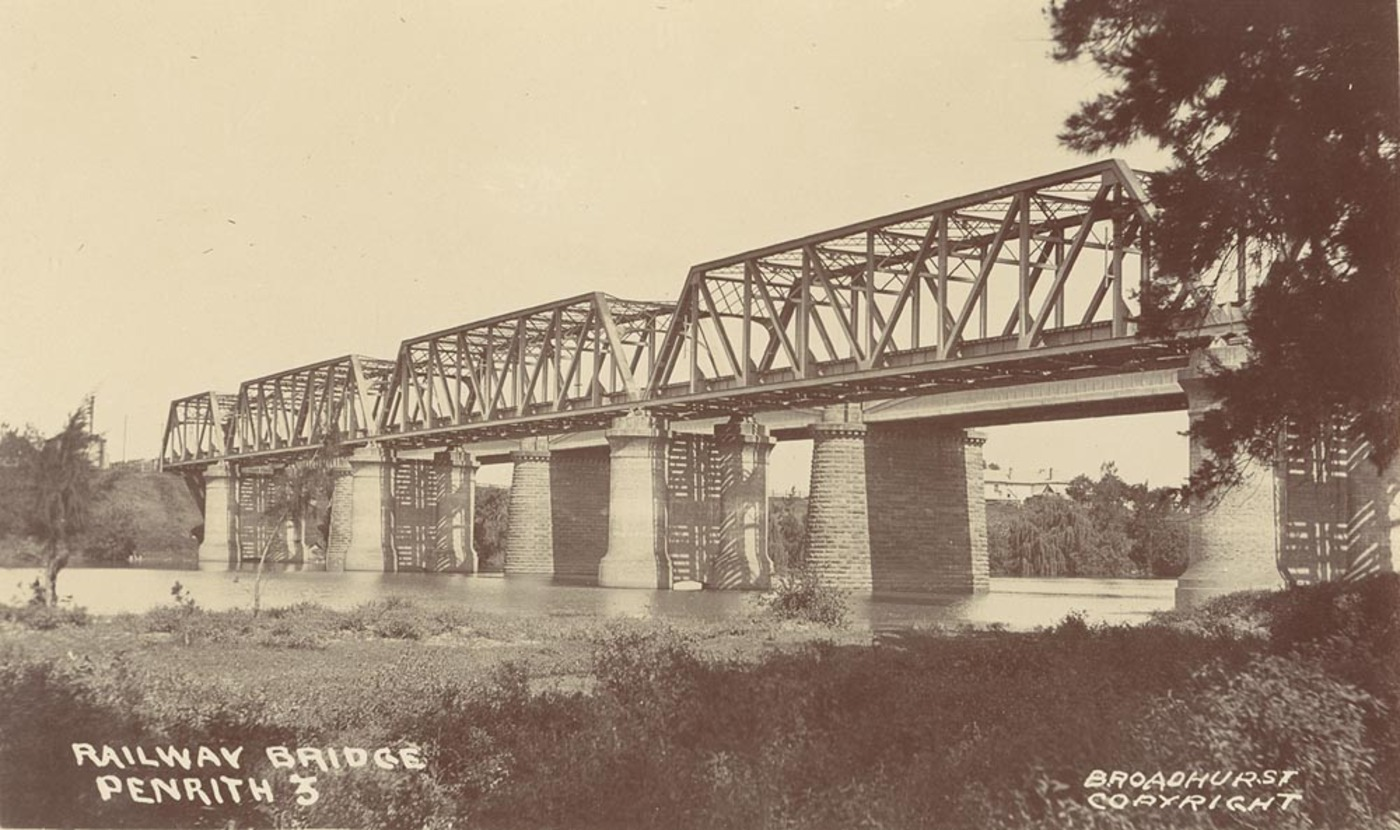
- The railway bridge at Penrith, c. 1920 – c. 1927, from the Broadhurst collection of postcards
- Coordinates: 33°44′45″S 150°40′54″E
- Carries: Main Western line
- Crosses: Nepean River
- Locale: Off Bruce Neale Dr, 1.3 kilometres (0.81 mi) west of the Penrith railway station, Penrith, City of Penrith, New South Wales, Australia
- Begins: Penrith (east)
- Ends: Emu Plains (west)
- Other names: Emu Plains (Nepean River) Underbridge; Penrith (Nepean River) Underbridge
- Owner: Transport Asset Manager of New South Wales
- Preceded by: Victoria Bridge

Characteristics
- Design: Pratt Truss railway underbridge
- Material: Steel
- Pier construction: Brick
- Longest span: 58.8 metres (193 ft)
- No. of spans: 5

Rail characteristics
- No. of tracks: 2
- Track gauge: 4 ft 8 1/2 in (1,435 mm) standard gauge
- Electrified: c. 1950s

History
- Designer: James Fraser
- Contracted lead designer: New South Wales Government Railways
- Constructed by: Labourers
- Fabrication by: R. Tulloch & Co.
- Construction end: 1907
- Replaces: Victoria Bridge (converted to motor vehicle use)

New South Wales Heritage Register
- Official name: Emu Plains (Nepean River) Underbridge; Penrith (Nepean River) Underbridge
- Type: State heritage (built)
- Designated: 28 June 2013
- Reference no.: 1830
- Type: Railway Bridge/Viaduct
- Category: Transport – Rail
- Builders: Fabrication by R. Tulloch & Co.; erection by day labour

Location
- Interactive map of Emu Plains Underbridge

Emu Plains Underbridge is a heritage-listed steel truss railway underbridge located off Bruce Neale Dr approximately 1.3 kilometres (0.81 mi) west of the Penrith railway station in the western Sydney suburb of Penrith, New South Wales, Australia. It was designed by James Fraser, the existing lines branch and the New South Wales Government Railways. It was built in 1907, with fabrication by R. Tulloch & Co.; and erection by day labour. It is also known as Emu Plains (Nepean River) Underbridge and Penrith (Nepean River) Underbridge. The property is owned by Transport Asset Manager of New South Wales, an agency of the Government of New South Wales. It was added to the New South Wales State Heritage Register on 28 June 2013.

== History ==
The Main West Railway Line runs from Granville to Bourke and was completed in 1885. By 1900 certain sections of John Whitton's single track railway network were operating at or near saturation, these included the famous Zig Zag near Lithgow, the Main West from Emu Plains right through to Bathurst, the Main South from Picton as far as Harden and the Main North between Maitland and Muswellbrook. Also, the metropolitan railways were congested by the combination of suburban and freight traffic. The Line was duplicated through Lithgow to Bowenfels in 1891 and then onto Wallerawang in 1922.

Pratt trusses were introduced to Australia from the United States in 1892 with the construction of the light-rail Yass Tramway. Thereafter they became the standard for Main Line railways for spans over 30 metres (98 ft). While previous forms of truss had lent themselves to construction from timber, with stocky timber sections with good compressive and buckling resistance forming the diagonal members, the Pratt Truss reversed the direction of load in the diagonal members, enabling light rods or flat bars to be used in tension, making steel trusses highly efficient. The New South Wales Railways continued to employ the use of steel Pratt trusses for major bridge crossings until the advent of reinforced and prestressed concrete in the 1970s.

The original railway, of the John Whitton era, crossed this river in 1867 on a massive wrought iron girder bridge. It was built for double track but only ever carried a single track with the adjacent space used for single lane road traffic. By the turn of the century, single line working was inadequate for the increasing traffic and the old bridge would not be strong enough for the steady increase in locomotive sizes and weight. Additional river piers in the river, as was done upstream at Menangle, was not considered appropriate so the decision was made to build a new heavy duty truss bridge and let the old bridge be used for two-way road traffic. That is still the current arrangement.

James Fraser, a future Commissioner, designed the new bridge as a series of double-track, American Pratt trusses for double the locomotive weights so as to allow for future increases without building another expensive replacement. Fraser joined the New South Wales Government Railways and Tramways in 1881 and rose to be engineer-in-chief for existing lines (1903–14), assistant-commissioner for railways (1914–16), chief railway commissioner (1917–29) and transport commissioner (1931–32). He was largely responsible for beginning the electrification of Sydney's suburban network and for the first stages of the city railway.

His 1907 bridge is still in use, carrying modern heavy diesel locomotives and heavy wagons of coal and wheat. Fabrication by the local firm of R. Tulloch & Co. proved the capacity home steelworks to handle projects of such magnitude that later enable them to supply all the bridges for the North Coast Railway 1911–1923. Instead of a forest of temporary staging in a flood prone river, Fraser chose to build the trusses continuously, from one bank to the other, over the piers and two intermediate timber trestles within each span. When completed, the linking members over the piers were removed and the bridge became five independent spans.

== Description ==
Five span, double track, riveted steel American-style Pratt through-truss railway bridge, with one 36.6-metre (120 ft) and four 58.8-metre (193 ft) spans between brick piers. The 1867 Whitton era Victoria bridge is adjacent.

=== Condition ===
As at 8 December 2009, the bridge is in good condition with the following defects: crack in caisson, minor corrosion and pitting in truss chords, stringers, connections and bracing members, and splitting transoms. The Nepean River Underbridge is of high integrity, retaining its original fabric in a good condition.

=== Modifications and dates ===
- 1961: Service pipes added.
- 1995: Safety platform and walkway added.

== Heritage listing ==
The 1907 Nepean River Underbridge is significant as one of the largest steel truss bridges in NSW, and remains the oldest truss bridge still in use in the metropolitan area, with a continuous railway use for over 100 years. The bridge is an imposing landmark structure over a major waterway and is an excellent example of a railway Pratt truss underbridge. Its significance is enhanced by its location adjacent to the 1867 Whitton era railway bridge which together demonstrate the evolution of railway bridge design from British railway technology from the mid 19th century through to the change to American technology of the early 20th century.

The bridge is significant for its historical associations with James Fraser, Chief Railway Commissioner of the NSW Railways (1917–29) and Transport Commissioner (1931–32), who was responsible for the design of the bridge during his role as Engineer-in-Chief for existing lines (1903–14). The bridge was constructed as part of the duplication of the Main West Line and used innovative construction techniques to avoid interruption of the construction programme in case of severe flooding. The bridge is also significant as its fabrication by the local firm of R. Tulloch & Co. which proved the capacity of local steelworks to handle projects of such magnitude, with the bridge becoming a benchmark for railway bridge construction throughout NSW.

Emu Plains Underbridge was listed on the New South Wales State Heritage Register on 28 June 2013 having satisfied the following criteria.

The place is important in demonstrating the course, or pattern, of cultural or natural history in New South Wales.

The Nepean River Underbridge has historical significance as part of the duplication of the Main West Line, one of the major lines on the NSW rail network. The bridge remains the oldest steel truss bridge in use in the metropolitan area, and has had a continuous railway use for over 100 years. Fabrication of the bridge by the local firm of R. Tulloch & Co. proved the capacity of local steelworks to handle projects of such magnitude that later enabled them to supply all the bridges for the North Coast Railway 1911–23. The bridge became a benchmark for railway bridge construction throughout NSW.

The place has a strong or special association with a person, or group of persons, of importance of cultural or natural history of New South Wales's history.

The bridge has historical associations with James Fraser, who was responsible for the design of the bridge during his role as engineer-in-chief for existing lines (1903–14). Fraser was also chief railway commissioner (1917–29) of the NSW Railways and transport commissioner (1931–32). James Fraser's design philosophy of building for future demand resulted in a durable, cost effective structure.

The place is important in demonstrating aesthetic characteristics and/or a high degree of creative or technical achievement in New South Wales.

The Nepean River Underbridge has aesthetic and technical significance due to its length, long spans, and its location adjacent to the 1867 Whitton era Victoria Bridge (both bridges being fine examples of railway viaduct construction) provides significant landmark quality. The bridge is also one of the largest truss bridges in NSW.

The Nepean River Underbridge has technical significance as the construction technique employed was a technical innovation that avoided the potential for serious interruption due to floods. Instead of using temporary staging in a flood prone river, the designer chose to build the trusses continuously, from one bank to the other, over the piers and two intermediate timber trestles within each span. When completed, the linking members over the piers were removed and the bridge became five independent spans.

The place has potential to yield information that will contribute to an understanding of the cultural or natural history of New South Wales.

The Nepean River Underbridge has research significance as the two parallel bridges demonstrate the evolution of railway bridge construction design during the late 19th and early 20th centuries.

The place is important in demonstrating the principal characteristics of a class of cultural or natural places/environments in New South Wales.

The Nepean River Underbridge is an excellent representative example of a Pratt truss railway viaduct construction, a technology introduced to the NSW rail network with the changeover to American bridge technology in 1892.

== See also ==
- Victoria Bridge (Penrith)
