= Craithes House =

- Location within Sydney Location within Australia
- 33°44′11″S 150°41′29″E
- Location: 34–40 Borec Road, Penrith, City of Penrith, New South Wales, Australia

History
- Built: 1870

Site notes
- Architectural style: Victorian Gothic Revival

New South Wales Heritage Register
- Official name: Craithes House
- Type: State heritage (built)
- Designated: 2 April 1999
- Reference no.: 378
- Type: House
- Category: Residential buildings (private)

Craithes House is a heritage-listed former rural homestead located at 34–40 Borec Road, Penrith, New South Wales, Australia. It was built in 1870. The property is privately owned. It was added to the New South Wales State Heritage Register on 2 April 1999.

== History ==
A Victorian Gothic Revival style rural villa built in c. 1870 for Joseph Single, set within a large garden at the end of a peppercorn avenue, a tall palm adjacent to the house acts as a local landmark.

== Description ==
The garden is set within a large garden at the end of a peppercorn (Schinus molle) tree avenue, a tall palm adjacent to the house acts as a local landmark.

The house is one of the best examples of a mid-late 19th century rural villa identified within the City of Penrith. Built in c. 1870 for Joseph Single. A well built rural villa.

== Heritage listing ==
Craithes House was listed on the New South Wales State Heritage Register on 2 April 1999.

== See also ==
- List of heritage houses in Sydney
