= 2024 Penrith City Council election =

- 14 September 2024

All 15 seats on Penrith City Council 8 seats needed for a majority
- Registered: 151,015
- Turnout: 83.7% (Note: Turnout for contested wards only.)

	First party	Second party
		IND
Party	Labor	Independents
Last election	5 seats	4 seats
Seats before	4	4
Seats won	9	3
Seat change	▲5	▼1
Primary vote	26,544	31,490
Percentage	33.9%	26.9%
Swing	▼0.6	▼2.9
	Third party	Fourth party
Party	Liberal	Libertarian
Last election	6 seats	Did not contest
Seats before	6	0
Seats won	2	1
Seat change	▼4	▲1
Primary vote	15,303	11,849
Percentage	19.5%	15.1%
Swing	▼13.8	▲15.1
- Results by ward

The 2024 Penrith City Council election was held on 14 September 2024 to elect 15 councillors to the City of Penrith. The election was held as part of the statewide local government elections in New South Wales.

The Labor Party gained a majority, winning nine seats (including five in an uncontested ward). The Liberal Party lost four of its six seats, owing to a missed candidate nomination deadline which prevented some of its councillors from recontesting.

== Background ==
North Ward councillor Jonathan Pullen resigned from the Labor Party on 27 June 2022. In August 2024, East Ward councillor Marlene Shipley joined the Liberal Party, while North Ward councillor Glenn Gardiner resigned from the Liberals to sit as an independent.

South Ward councillor Jim Aitken resigned on 21 July 2023, with his seat left vacant until the election.

== Electoral system ==
Like in all other New South Wales local government areas (LGAs), Penrith City Council elections use optional preferential voting. Under this system, voters are only required to vote for one candidate or group, although they can choose to preference other candidates.

All elections for councillor positions are elected using proportional representation. Penrith has an Australian Senate-style ballot paper with above-the-line and below-the-line voting. The council is divided into three wards, each electing five councillors.

The election was conducted by the New South Wales Electoral Commission (NSWEC).

== Retiring councillors ==
=== Labor ===
- Karen McKeown (South) – elected to parliament in 2023

=== Liberal ===
- Tricia Hitchen (East) – announced retirement on 14 March 2025

=== Independents ===
- Jonathan Pullen (North)

== Candidates ==
On 14 August 2024, the day that candidates nominations closed, the Liberal Party revealed they had missed the deadline to nominate 164 candidates in 16 different LGAs. This included all Liberal candidates in East Ward and South Ward. With no other parties nominating, all five Labor Party candidates in East Ward were elected unopposed.

=== East ===
Labor

1. Todd Carney
2. Garion Thain
3. Sarbjeet Kaur
4. Edwin Mifsud
5. Libby Austin

=== North ===
Labor (Group A)	Independent (Group B)	Independent (Group C)	Liberal (Group D)	Greens (Group E)
1. John Thain; 2. Robin Cook; 3. Kyra Quinlivan; 4. Bradley Hulls; 5. Laine Fox	1. Amanda Cardwell; 2. Geetha Rajagopalan; 3. Josie Monteleone; 4. Elizabeth Curtis; 5. Ross Cardwell	1. Glenn Gardiner; 2. Kevin Crameri; 3. Damian Griggs; 4. Varun Thakkar; 5. Barbara Murphy	1. Ross Fowler; 2. Reece Nuttall; 3. Dennis Golding; 4. Enid Golding; 5. Julie Fletcher	1. Shafaq Jaffery; 2. Nick Best; 3. Jacquie Wilson; 4. David Maurice; 5. Zeeshan Abdul

=== South ===
Independent (Group A)	Libertarian (Group B)	Labor (Group C)
1. Sue Day; 2. Faithe Skinner; 3. Rebecca Carroll; 4. Jo-Anne Topp; 5. Neal Bates	1. Vanessa Pollak; 2. Roxanne Vines; 3. Vanessa Pericich; 4. Lain Vincent; 5. Jason Fraser	1. Hollie McLean; 2. Kirstie Boerst; 3. Lorraine Fordham; 4. Mohinder Singh; 5. Mitchell Hearne

=== Withdrawn candidates ===
Party	Candidate	Ward	Details
Liberal	Bernard Bratusa	East	Incumbent councillor unable to recontest because of missed candidacy deadline.
Liberal	Marlene Shipley	East	Incumbent councillor unable to recontest because of missed candidacy deadline.
Liberal	Mark Davies	South	Incumbent councillor unable to recontest because of missed candidacy deadline.
Liberal	Mark Rusev	South	Incumbent councillor unable to recontest because of missed candidacy deadline.

== Results ==
=== Ward results ===
2024 Penrith City Council election: Ward results
Party	Votes	%	Swing	Seats	Change
Labor	26,544	33.9	−0.6	9	▲4
Independents	31,490	26.9	−2.9	3	▼1
Liberal	15,303	19.5	−13.8	2	▼4
Libertarian	11,849	15.1	+15.1	1	▲1
Greens	3,522	4.5	+4.5	0	Steady
Formal votes	78,282	91.6			
Informal votes	7,221	8.4			
Total	85,503	100.0		15	
Registered voters / turnout	151,015	83.7			

=== East ===
2024 Penrith City Council election: East Ward
Party	Candidate	Votes	%	±%
Labor	1. Todd Carney (elected); 2. Garion Thain (elected); 3. Sarbjeet Kaur (elected); 4. Edwin Mifsud (elected); 5. Libby Austin (elected)	unopposed		
Registered electors		48,861		

=== North ===
2024 Penrith City Council election: North Ward
Party	Candidate	Votes	%	±%
Liberal	1. Ross Fowler (elected 1); 2. Reece Nuttall (elected 3); 3. Dennis Golding; 4. Enid Golding; 5. Julie Fletcher	15,303	37.8	+4.6
Labor	1. John Thain (elected 2); 2. Robin Cook (elected 4); 3. Kyra Quinlivan; 4. Bradley Hulls; 5. Laine Fox	13,534	33.4	−0.4
Independent	1. Glenn Gardiner (elected 5); 2. Kevin Crameri; 3. Damian Griggs; 4. Varun Thakkar; 5. Barbara Murphy	4,349	10.7	
Independent	1. Amanda Cardwell; 2. Geetha Rajagopalan; 3. Josie Monteleone; 4. Elizabeth Curtis; 5. Ross Cardwell	3,796	9.4	
Greens	1. Shafaq Jaffery; 2. Nick Best; 3. Jacquie Wilson; 4. David Maurice; 5. Zeeshan Abdul	3,522	8.7	
Total formal votes		40,504	92.2	
Informal votes		3,428	7.8	
Turnout		43,932	82.9	

=== South ===
2024 Penrith City Council election: South Ward
Party	Candidate	Votes	%	±%
Labor	1. Hollie McLean (elected 2); 2. Kirstie Boerst (elected 5); 3. Lorraine Fordham; 4. Mohinder Singh; 5. Mitchell Hearne	13,010	34.4	+4.3
Independent	1. Sue Day (elected 1); 2. Faithe Skinner (elected 4); 3. Rebecca Carroll; 4. Jo-Anne Topp; 5. Neal Bates	12,919	34.2	+14.9
Libertarian	1. Vanessa Pollak (elected 3); 2. Roxanne Vines; 3. Vanessa Pericich; 4. Lain Vincent; 5. Jason Fraser	11,849	31.4	+31.4
Total formal votes		37,778	90.9	
Informal votes		3,793	9.1	
Turnout		41,571	84.6	
