= Agnes Banks Natural Area =

- Location within Sydney Location within Australia
- 33°38′27″S 150°41′57″E
- Location: Rickards Avenue, Agnes Banks, City of Penrith, New South Wales, Australia

Site notes
- Owner: CSR Limited; Office of Environment and Heritage

New South Wales Heritage Register
- Official name: Natural Area; The Natural Area; Agnes Banks Sand Deposits
- Type: State heritage (landscape)
- Designated: 2 April 1999
- Reference no.: 649
- Type: Soil site
- Category: Landscape - Natural

The Agnes Banks Natural Area is a heritage-listed natural sand deposit, fauna habitat and native flora site at Rickards Avenue in the western Sydney suburb of Agnes Banks, New South Wales, Australia. It is also known as The Natural Area and Agnes Banks Sand Deposits. The property is owned by CSR Limited and the NSW Office of Environment and Heritage. It was added to the New South Wales State Heritage Register on 2 April 1999.

== History ==
The Londonderry/Agnes Banks sand deposit was first recognised for its commercial potential in 1942. Sand had been extracted from the deposit for over thirty years, initially under consent from the then Cumberland County Council. Penrith City Council first issued consents in 1967 for the extraction of sand from land held under permissive occupancies from the Crown Lands Office and from land held under private tenure.

Penrith Council later realised the need for an overall management framework for the extractive industries and during the mid-1970s formed a working committee consisting of Council, the then Department of Mines, Department of Lands and the extractive industry companies. This committee sought information and produced guidelines for co-ordinating ongoing extraction and rehabilitation within a defined management area. In 1982 after extensive consultation with the community in the locality, sand extraction companies and government agencies, Council adopted in principle the management plan, which, inter alia, addressed management of extraction, drainage, staged extraction and rehabilitation. Regular meetings of the parties were held to ensure compliance with the plan.

Comments received from the NSW National Parks & Wildlife Service (NPWS) at the time indicated the Service's concern for the inter-relationships between sand extraction and the proposed nature reserve to the south of the management area. As a consequence provision was made for a 30-metre (98 ft) wide buffer strip between areas designated for extraction and the nature reserve.

The nature reserve proposal involved lengthy discussion with government agencies, Council and the extractive industry companies. The proposal was initiated by the Scientific Committee on Parks and Reserves in August 1968. This committee had advised of the scientific value and uniqueness of the sand areas and of the threat to them posed by sand extraction. In the following years several proposals were advanced by the NPWS and by Benson of the National Herbarium, Royal Botanic Gardens. Negotiations between the parties continued until a compromise proposal put forward in 1978 by White of P. B. White Minerals (now Pacific Mining Pty. Ltd.) was finally accepted. However the NPWS although accepting the proposal, noted in correspondence to the Department of Lands at the time that the proposal was sub-optimal in area and composition. The Agnes Banks Nature Reserve was proclaimed on 26 March 1982.

On the 18 April 1985 two development applications were received by Council which in part were for consent to extract sand adjacent to the Agnes Banks Nature Reserve.

The National Trust of Australia (NSW) wrote to Penrith City Council on 23 August 1985 indicating its proposal for the extension of the Nature Reserve to ensure it properly sampled the range of plant communities on the site. On the 26 August 1985, the Trust wrote to the Heritage Council requesting the placing of an interim conservation order (ICO) on the remaining areas of vegetation outside the Nature Reserve. ICO No. 569 was gazetted on 27 September 1985 for a period of two years subsequently ICO No. 800 was gazetted on 18 September 1987. In August, 1987, The Readymix Group, Amatek Limited and K. H. Dixon Pty. Ltd. made a submission by way of objection to the former Minister for Planning and Environment in regard to ICO No. 569. Formal objections to the making of ICO No. 800 dated 5 February 1988 were subsequently received by the Heritage Council. Commissioner Kevin Cleland was appointed to hold an inquiry into the submission by of objection on 25 July 1988 in accordance with Section of the Heritage Act, 1977. A total of twenty seven submissions were received of which fourteen were presented to the inquiry and a further six were read on behalf of the writers. The Companies, Department of Mineral Resources and Department of Lands objected to the making of the ICO. The majority of the other submissions supported the making of a Permanent Conservation Order. Several submissions related to other matters.

=== Further information ===
The Agnes Banks Natural Area adjoins the Agnes Banks Nature Reserve created in March 1982. The 123-hectare (300-acre) nature reserve is managed by the National Parks and Wildlife Service.

== Heritage listing ==
As at 25 January 2013, the Agnes Banks Natural Area is of State Heritage significance for its environmental heritage with natural, scientific and aesthetic significance for the following reasons:

=== Importance in the evolution of Australian flora, fauna, landscapes and climate ===
The "Agnes Banks Sand" is described as a stratigraphic unit of Pliocene of Pleistocene age (7 million-300,000 years ago) and probably a fluvial deposit which has been redistributed by westerly winds. The sands are surrounded by and overlie lateritized tertiary alluvial deposits, mainly clay and silts which make up the Cumberland Plain to the south and east. The sand deposit is unique in that although it is 55 kilometres (34 mi) from the present coast, it supports unusual vegetation in many ways similar to coastal sand dune vegetation such as Myall Lakes, and with affinities also to Hawkesbury sandstone vegetation which is located in the Sydney Basin. The deposits themselves are highly important scientifically: as a reference site for understanding the past climatic history of the region; and, for comparison of the vegetation with similar vegetation on coastal sand deposits. The sediment making up the deposit originates from sandstone rock of the Blue Mountains and as such demonstrates the evolutionary process of weathering and deposition.

=== Importance in demonstrating existing processes or natural systems ===
The Agnes Banks Natural Area supports four distinct associations. These are described as:

1. Low open forest – of Banksia serrata and Angophora bakeri which is confined to the well-drained crests of the large dunes;
2. Woodland – of Eucalyptus sclerophylla, A. bakeri and B. serrata on well-drained and moderately well-drained positions;
3. Woodland – of E. sclerophylla, E. parramattensis and B. aemula on shallow sand; and
4. Low-open Woodland – of E. parramattensis which is confined to poorly-drained situations.

Studies by the National Herbarium, Royal Botanic Gardens indicate that species distribution is dominated primarily by a moisture drainage factor which produces a continuum of species. Projective' canopy cover and fire also influence the distribution of the vegetation. The relationship between these environmental factors and vegetation communities is clearly demonstrated at the Agnes Banks Natural Area.

=== Importance in exhibiting unusual richness or diversity of flora ===
The diversity of soil types and conditions has given rise to a corresponding diversity of vegetation types as indicated above.

=== Importance for rare and endangered or uncommon flora, communities, ecosystems and landscape ===
As described in I above, the sand deposits at Agnes Banks are an unusual and rare landform which, in conjunction with vegetation cover, results in a rare landscape type. Areas of original vegetation on the sand deposits associated with the Hawkesbury-Nepean rivers are extremely limited. The area is thus significant as a unique sample of this vegetation, which is otherwise not conserved. The Natural Area support several species which are considered rare or threatened, being represented by small populations, disjunct populations, or being at or near their geographic limits. These include the following:

- Intergrades between Banksia serrata and B. aemula (formerly B. serrati folia) in parts of portion 157.
- Acacia Bynoena on portion 157 – small populations elsewhere.
- Restio pallens – southern limit at Agnes Banks.
- Persoonia nutans – population on portion 157 is possibly the only surviving location for this species
- Petrophile sessilis – northern limit at Agnes Banks, uncommon elsewhere.
- Leucopogon virgatus – common at Agnes Banks overall but uncommon in the Nature Reserve.
- Dillwynia tenuifolia – small populations, vulnerable in the long term.
- Micromytus minutiflora – as above.

The whole community, with associations relating intergrading with each other, in this isolated inland position, at a low elevation are unique. Likewise is the ecosystem mechanics which operate and determine the species distribution.

=== Importance as representative of the range of ecosystems which characterise sand vegetation type ===
More than half of the original sand area of 460 hectares (1,100 acres) (sic.) at Agnes Banks has been cleared or quarried. Only two of the five plant communities recognised on the sand are represented in the existing Nature Reserve. Of the Reserve's 64 hectares (160 acres) only 16 hectares (40 acres) or 3.5 per cent (sic.) of the original sand mass is conserved. One of the plant communities - sedgeland - has now been completely destroyed through sand mining operations. The current Agnes Bank Reserve does not sample any Low Open Forest Banksia Serrata and Angophora Bakeri or Woodland E. Sclerophylla, Banksia Serrata and Angophora Baker plant associations. The only other known occurrence of B. Serrata in the general area is a tiny stand on freehold land which is badly damaged. Furthermore, the Agnes Banks Natural Area supports other species, namely Persoonia nutans, and Petrophile sessilis, which are not adequately conserved. This inadequate representation of the variation in the system limits the scope of the area for scientific research.

=== Importance for information contributing to wider understanding of Australian natural history ===
By virtue of their use as research sites, teaching sites, type localities and reference sites:

1. the isolated location of the deposit makes it suitable for biogeographical studies;
2. the relationship with the surrounding/underlying clay is of interest as is the internal dynamics controlled by soil water status and fire frequency;
3. the distinct change in vegetation at the sandclay interface;
4. the B. aemula/B. serrata interface/hybrid swarm presents a good opportunity for population genetics/autoecological studies;
5. the complex ecotone between plant association of Woodland and Low Woodland;
6. the site is unusual in geomorphological terms; and
7. the sands are important as a soil reference site.

Furthermore, as environmental education is a component of school curriculum, the demand for areas such as Agnes Banks for field studies, is great.

Aboriginal sites already identified at Agnes Banks are believed to date to about 13,000 years ago. Open sites of this age are rare in eastern New South Wales. It is possible that older sites are situated within or under the sand. Agnes Banks may prove to be a significant source of information about human occupation during the late Pleistocene period.

The Agnes Bank Natural Area was listed on the New South Wales State Heritage Register on 2 April 1999.

== See also ==
- Protected areas of New South Wales
