= Penrith, New South Wales =

Penrith
- Suburb
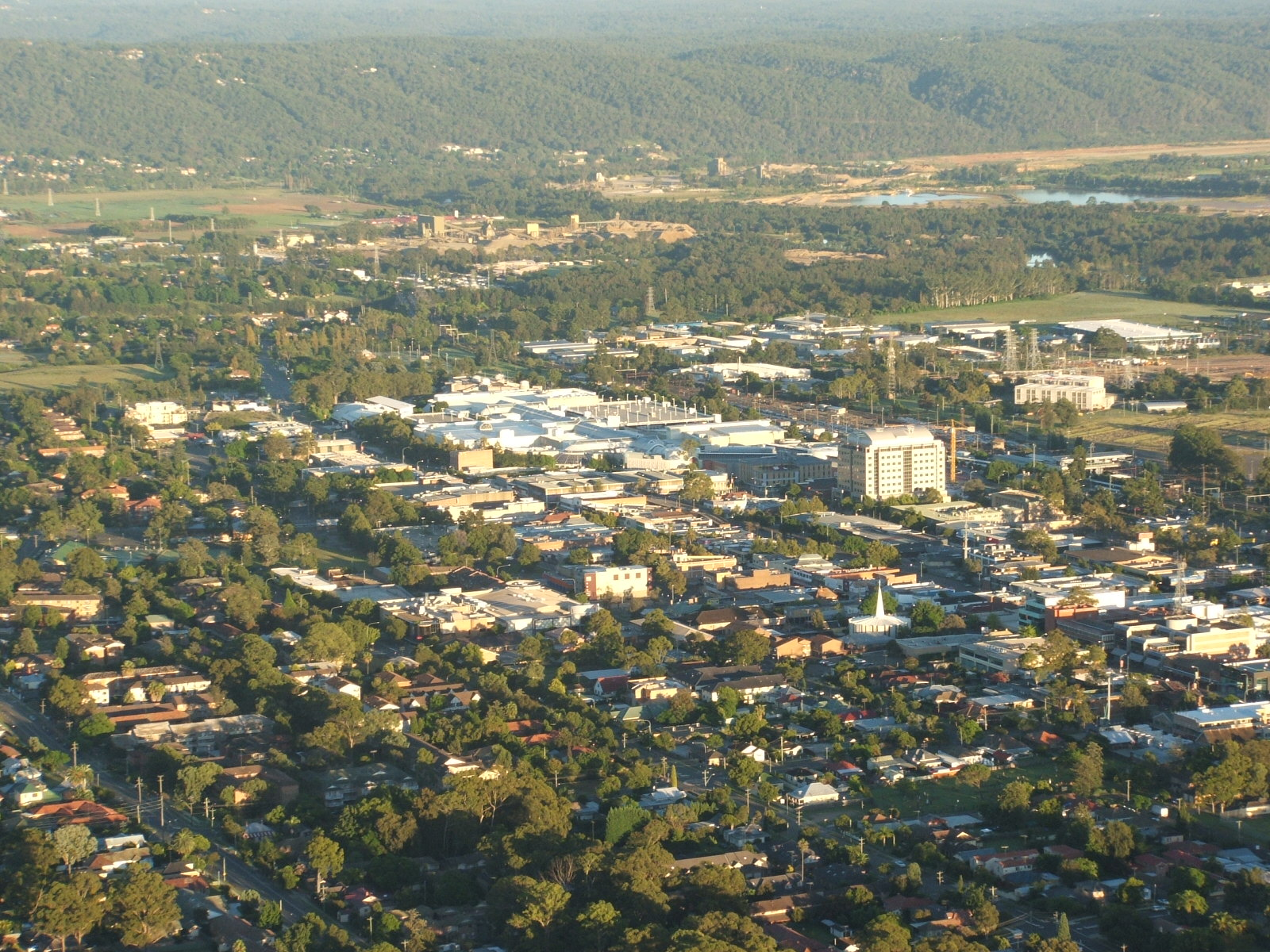
- Penrith's central business district and commercial area

- Interactive map of Penrith
- Coordinates: 33°45′04″S 150°41′39″E
- Country: Australia
- State: New South Wales
- City: Sydney
- LGA: City of Penrith
- Location: 55 km (34 mi) west of Sydney CBD; 50 km (31 mi) east of Katoomba
- Established: 1815

Government
  - State electorate: Penrith
  - Federal division: Lindsay

Area
  - Total: 12.33 km^{2} (4.76 sq mi)
- Elevation: 32 m (105 ft)

Population
  - Total: 17,966 (SAL 2021)
- Postcode: 2750
Suburbs around Penrith
Castlereagh	Cranebrook	Cambridge Gardens
Emu Plains	Penrith	Cambridge Park
Jamisontown	South Penrith	Kingswood

Location map of Penrith based on NASA satellite images

Penrith is a suburb in Outer Western Sydney, New South Wales, Australia. It is located 55 kilometres (34 mi) west of the Sydney central business district on the eastern bank of the Nepean River. It is on the outskirts of the Cumberland Plain at an elevation of 32 metres (105 ft). Penrith is the administrative centre for the City of Penrith local government area.

== History ==
=== Indigenous settlement ===
Prior to the arrival of the Europeans, the Penrith area was home to the Mulgoa tribe of the Darug people. They lived in makeshift huts called gunyahs, hunted native animals such as kangaroos, fished in the Nepean River, and gathered local fruits and vegetables such as yams.. Most of the Mulgoa were killed by smallpox or galgala shortly after the arrival of the First Fleet in 1788. Early British explorers such as Watkin Tench described them as friendly, saying, "they bade us adieu, in unabated friendship and good humour".

=== European exploration ===
The recorded history of Penrith began on 26 June 1789. Eighteen months after the landing of the First Fleet, an exploring party led by Captain Watkin Tench set out to further discoveries made by Governor Arthur Phillip earlier in the month. In the daylight hours of 27 June, Tench and his party discovered the broad expanse of the Nepean River. Tench's party became the first Europeans to see the site of what is now the City of Penrith. Tench later wrote 'we found ourselves on the banks of a river, nearly as broad as the Thames at Putney and apparently of great depth'. Phillip later named the river after Evan Nepean, the under-secretary of state in the Home Office, who had been largely responsible for the organisation of the First Fleet. From this point, European settlement began in earnest, firstly on the Hawkesbury River, and later southward up the Nepean.

=== European settlement ===
Governor Phillip Gidley King began granting land in the area to settlers in 1804 with Captain Daniel Woodriff's 1,000 acres (4.0 km^{2}) on the banks of the river the first land grant in the area. The first government building in the district was the military depot built (at the present Penrith police station) by William Cox, in mid-1815 near the new Road (Great Western Road) on unassigned Crown land, set well back from the river. It represented the formalisation of law and order in the district. Its placement seems to have been a practical decision by Cox, placing it on flood-free Crown land on the new road to Parramatta, just east of Woodriff's Rodley Farm. Governor Lachlan Macquarie paid Cox £200 for 'erecting a Depot for Provisions, Guard House, erecting necessary Enclosures for cattle and Garden Ground, Frame for a Well ... on the new near Emu Ford'. At this time, Emu Ford was one of the few locality names that would indicate the depot's position.

In 1816, Cox mentioned the lockup at 'Penryhn', among a list of expenses. There appears little doubt that he was referring to the depot that was later referred to as Penrith. The name for the new depot, Penrhyn, may have simply been misinterpreted by others. Penrhyn was possibly named after the First Fleet ship that carried women convicts, the Lady Penrhyn. There is no historical evidence to prove Macquarie's hand in naming the depot, especially considering he often endowed and recorded benefactors with that favour. Furthermore, Macquarie would have ensured that a plan of the town would have been drawn up. No documentary evidence has shed any light on Macquarie's reasoning for the placement of this depot and its connection with his vision for a township at Castlereagh.

What is clear is that the origin of the name, Penrith is steeped in mystery. Penrith was possibly named after Penrith in Cumbria by someone who knew the old town and who noted geographical similarities. By 1819, the name Penrith was in use with its first reference in the Sydney Gazette on 8 December 1821 appointing John Proctor as keeper of the new gaol and court house.

The lockup at Penrith placed government law and order in the centre of the Evan district. This group of buildings became the point of contact for local administration for anything ranging from issuing publican's licences, holding inquests and church services. Although a magistrate had been appointed to Castlereagh in 1811, the Penrith lockup increased in importance with its promotion to a court house in 1817. A bench of magistrates was appointed: Sir John Jamison, the Reverend Henry Fulton, John McHenry and a military officer from the regiment stationed there. In 1814, William Cox constructed a road across the Blue Mountains which passed through Woodriff's land at Penrith. Initial settlement in the area was unplanned but substantial enough for a courthouse to be established in 1817.

The post office was established in 1828, the Anglican church, St Stephens, was opened and consecrated 16 July 1839 followed by the Catholic Church, St Nicholas of Myra, in 1850. Two other prominent Penrith pioneers were Irish-born Thomas Jamison (1752/53-1811), a member of the First Fleet and surgeon-general of New South Wales (after whom Jamisontown is named), and his son, the landowner, physician and constitutional reformer Sir John Jamison (1776–1844). In 1824, Sir John erected the colony's finest Georgian mansion, Regentville House, near Penrith, on a ridge overlooking the Nepean River. Sir John established an agricultural estate at Regentville and became a Member of the New South Wales Legislative Council. His grave can be seen in St Stephen's graveyard. Regentville House burned down in 1868 but most of its stonework was salvaged and used for building projects in and around Penrith.

The first bridge, financed by local businessman James Tobias (Toby) Ryan was opened over the Nepean in 1856 and was washed away the following year in a flood. The railway line was extended to Penrith railway station in 1863, a school was established in 1865 and in 1871 the area became a municipality. It officially became a city in 1959.

== Commercial area ==
Penrith is one of the major commercial centres in Greater Western Sydney. The suburb contains two shopping centres.

- Westfield Penrith, (formerly Penrith Plaza) is the largest shopping centre in the suburb, it opened on 30 March 1971, it was acquired by Westfield in 2005, and it is located within a main commercial centre.
- Nepean Village (formerly Nepean Square) is a single level shopping centre located in Penrith. It has many retailers including Kmart, Coles, and The Reject Shop.

== Transport ==
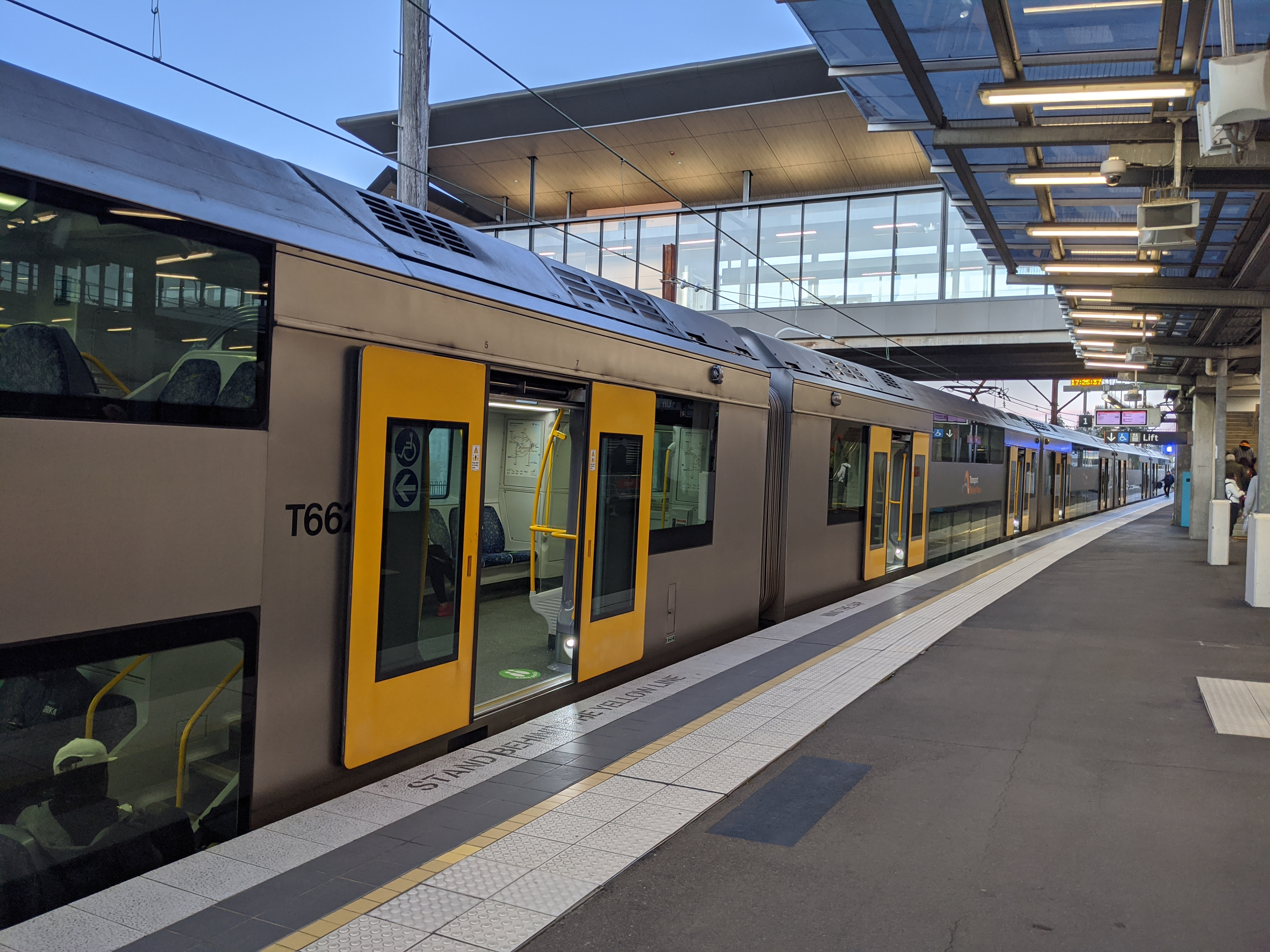
A Sydney Trains city bound service at Penrith Station

Penrith railway station is a major railway station on the Main Western railway line. It has frequent services to and from the city and is also a stop on the intercity Blue Mountains Line.

Penrith railway station is served by a bus interchange and by the Nightride Bus route 70.

Between 1940 and 1950, the Log Cabin Hotel in Penrith was served by its own station. Log Cabin railway station was accessible to the public and used by patrons of the hotel from the city. Despite requests by Penrith Council for full integration with Sydney rail services as the western terminus for the suburban network, Log Cabin station was only ever used for special services.

Penrith can be accessed from St. Marys and Mount Druitt via the Great Western Highway. Access from further east is best obtained by the M4 Western Motorway using either The Northern Road or Mulgoa Road exits. If travelling east from the Blue Mountains, access is best obtained by the Great Western Highway. Access from the south can be obtained by The Northern Road and Mulgoa Road, north from Castlereagh road or Richmond road, or from north and south via Westlink M7 and the M4 Western Motorway.

The NSW Government announced funding for the construction of the M9 in the 2014 state budget to connect Camden, Penrith and Windsor. The proposed motorway will start from the M5 motorway and run west of the current M7 motorway.

== Education ==
Penrith Public School and Penrith High School are two public schools in High Street. Jamison High School is in South Penrith. St Nicholas of Myra is a Catholic primary school, which is part of Catholic Education, Diocese of Parramatta, is located in Higgins Street.

The Penrith campus of Nepean College of TAFE is located in the centre of town on Henry Street. The Penrith campus of the University of Western Sydney is located in nearby Werrington. The University of Sydney has a campus near Nepean Hospital in Kingswood, for research into the basic biomedical sciences and educating medical students at the hospital.

== Landmarks and tourist attractions ==
=== Heritage listings ===
Penrith has a number of heritage-listed sites, including:

- 34–40 Borec Road: Craithes House
- 26 Coombes Drive: Torin Building
- Great Western railway: Penrith railway station, Sydney
- Nepean River, Great Western Highway: Victoria Bridge (Penrith)
- Off Bruce Neale Dr, Steel Trusses 1.3 km past station: Emu Plains Underbridge
- 1 Museum Drive: Penrith Museum of Fire, including the following:
  - Fire and Rescue NSW Heritage Fleet
  - NSW Fire Brigades No 10 Vehicle Number Plates
  - 1869 Shand Mason 7 inch Manual Fire Engine
  - 1891 Shand Mason Fire Engine
  - 1898 Shand Mason Curricle Ladders
  - 1909 Edward Smith Headquarters Switchboard
  - 1929 Ahrens Fox PS2 Fire Engine
  - 1939 Dennis Big 6 Fire Engine
  - 1942 Ford 21W Fire Brigade Mobile Canteen

Other items of interest include:

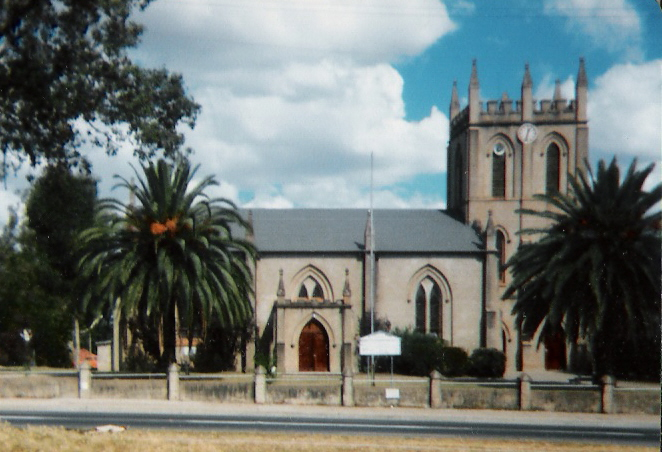
St Stephen's Church

- Nepean Belle, an old-world style paddlewheeler located on the Nepean River at Penrith.
- St Stephen's Church (1839), in High Street, and its historic graveyard, is heritage-listed
- Penrith has a campus of the Western Sydney University
- Sydney International Regatta Centre, which was the location for the rowing competitions for the 2000 Olympic Games
- Panthers World of Entertainment
- Penrith Sake Brewery
- Nepean River
- Head of the River, which takes place at the regatta centre
- Red Cow Hotel, Station Street, is Penrith's oldest standing hotel
- Thornton Hall, Mountain View Crescent, is heritage-listed
- Nepean Park, Castlereagh Road, is heritage-listed

== Culture ==
=== Arts ===
The Joan Sutherland Performing Arts Complex is in High Street next to the Council Chambers. Named after opera singer Joan Sutherland, the building was designed by architect Philip Cox and opened in 1990. It incorporates the Penrith Conservatorium of Music and the Q Theatre (Penrith), which had been operating in Station Street for 30 years before moving to the complex in 2006.

=== Sport and recreation ===
Penrith Stadium is the home of the Penrith Panthers NRL team. Penrith's Junior Rugby League competition is the largest in the world, which also incorporates teams from the Blue Mountains, Blacktown and Windsor/Richmond areas.

Penrith Stadium was also home to the Penrith Nepean United FC soccer club. The team had a 2–1 win against Sydney FC in a home game friendly match in front of 5000 fans on 17 August 2007.

There are also many other sporting associations, including cricket clubs, AFL clubs, Penrith City Outlaws gridiron team, Panthers Triathlon club, Penrith Emus Rugby, swimming, and soccer clubs.

Just west of Cranebrook is Penrith Lakes, a system of flooded quarries that are now recreational lakes, in addition to featuring Pondi Beach, an artificial beach. One of these lakes hosted the rowing events of the Sydney 2000 Olympics. This facility is rated as a Level One course which can be used for international events. The course itself is fully buoyed and can be modified to accommodate swimming and kayaking events.

North of the rowing lake is the Penrith Whitewater Stadium, the only pump-powered and artificial whitewater slalom course in the Southern Hemisphere. It was built for the Sydney 2000 Olympics, and it continues to host international competitions on a regular basis.

Penrith is home to the Elite Fight Gym. A mixed martial arts training facility established by UFC fighter James Te-Huna. In 2013, James te Huna left EFG to establish a rival MMA centre in St Marys named Bee Stingz (located at Valley Fitness).

The first Flip Out trampoline arena was opened in Penrith in 2012. The franchise has since gained over 60 locations across 6 countries.

Penrith Softball Club - Founded in 1975, the Penrith Softball Club has been the driving force behind the sport in the local area.

=== Media ===
Penrith is home to three local newspapers: The Western Weekender, Nepean News, and Penrith Press, the latter of which no longer produces a print edition. The Weekender is considered its newspaper of record, and produces a weekly print edition as well as 24/7 online coverage. The current FM radio station "CADA" 96.1 FM evolved from the former (original) 2KA station. Vintage FM broadcasts into Penrith on 87.8FM. The licensed community radio station, WOW FM 100.7 ceased broadcasting in September 2025. In 2001 the Penrith Museum of Printing opened. Its collection represents the history of Australian letterpress printing.

== Geography ==
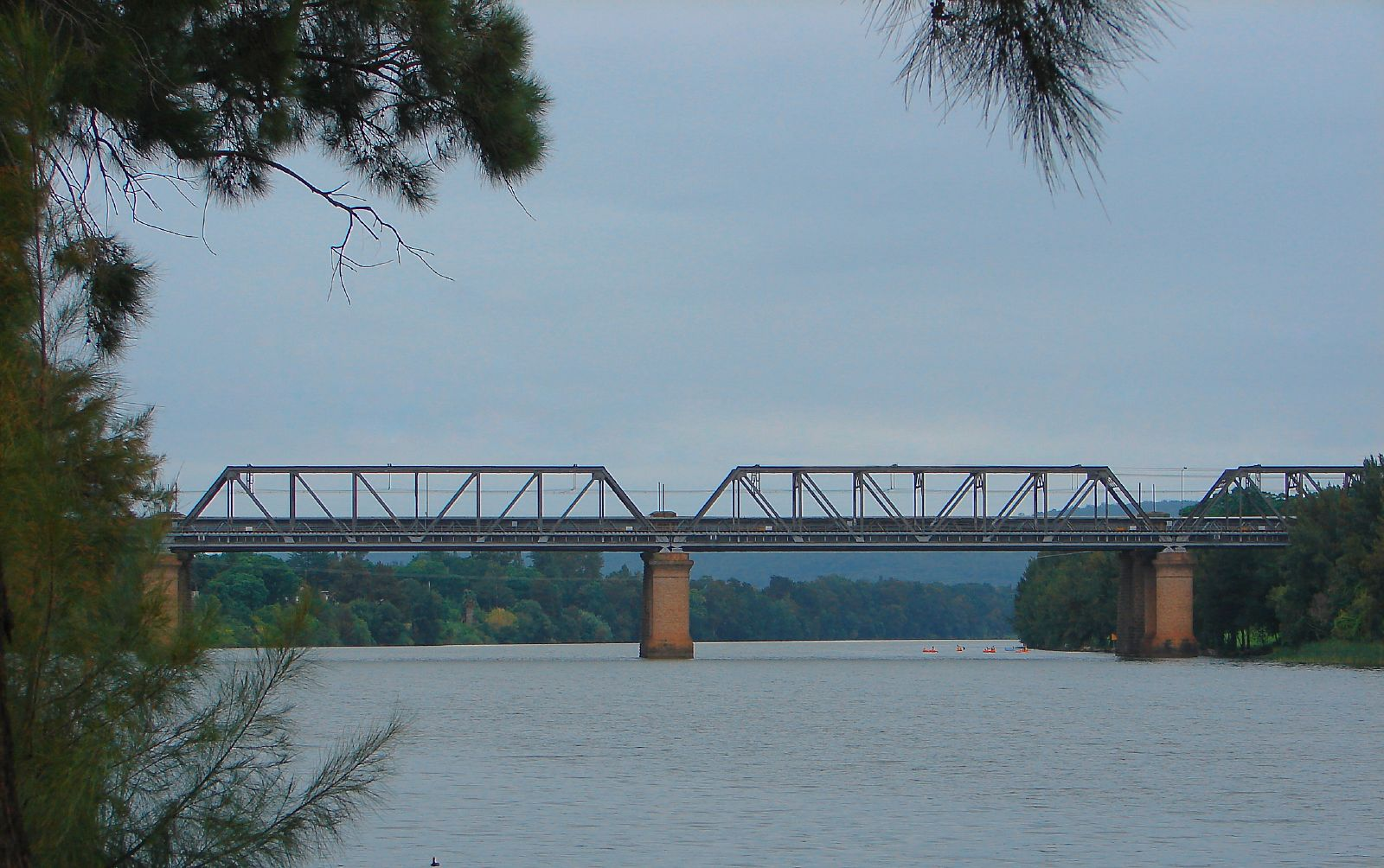
Victoria Bridge over the Nepean River, linking Penrith to Emu Plains

Penrith sits on the western edge of the Cumberland Plain, a fairly flat area of Western Sydney, extending to Windsor in the north, Parramatta in the east and Thirlmere in the south. The Nepean River forms the western boundary of the suburb and beyond that, dominating the western skyline, are the Blue Mountains. There is a difference of opinion between Penrith City Council and the Geographical Names Board of New South Wales as to the boundaries of Penrith the suburb. The Board includes in its official description the area of Kingswood Park, Lemongrove and North Penrith, which the Council considers separate suburbs.

=== Climate ===
Penrith has a humid subtropical climate (Köppen: Cfa) with long, hot summers, mild to cool short winters with cold nights, and pleasant spring and autumn. The daytime temperatures are generally a few degrees hotter than Sydney (Observatory Hill), especially during spring and summer, when the difference in temperature between Penrith and the Sydney area can be quite pronounced. Night-time temperatures are a few degrees cooler than Sydney on most nights of the year. In extreme cases, there could be a temperature differential of 10 °C (18 °F) in summer, owing to sea breezes, which affect coastal areas much more than areas further from the ocean and do not usually penetrate as far inland as Penrith. Frost occasionally occurs on some winter mornings, mainly due to a mountain breeze and a temperature inversion caused by the proximate mountains. The average summer temperature range is from 17.9 to 29.8 °C (64.2 to 85.6 °F) and in the winter 6.2 to 18.6 °C (43.2 to 65.5 °F).

Mean yearly rainfall in Penrith is 719.2 millimetres or 28.31 inches, which is significantly less than recorded closer to the coast (Sydney Observatory Hill's mean yearly rainfall is 1,212.2 millimetres or 47.72 inches), as coastal showers do not penetrate inland. The highest recorded temperature was 48.9 °C or 120.0 °F on 4 January 2020 – a day when Penrith was the hottest place on earth. The lowest recorded temperature was −1.8 °C or 28.8 °F on 16 July 2018. Penrith's hot temperatures are exacerbated by a combination of its inland location, urban heat island effect (i.e. density of housing and lack of trees) and its position on the footsteps of the Blue Mountains, which trap hot air. Penrith's dry, sunny winters are owed to the Great Dividing Range blocking westerly cold fronts, which turn to foehn winds on the range's leeward side (that includes all of the Sydney metropolitan area).

Climate data for Penrith Lakes AWS (1995−)
Month	Jan	Feb	Mar	Apr	May	Jun	Jul	Aug	Sep	Oct	Nov	Dec	Year
Record high °C (°F)	48.9 (120.0)	46.9 (116.4)	40.6 (105.1)	36.6 (97.9)	29.4 (84.9)	26.0 (78.8)	28.2 (82.8)	30.3 (86.5)	37.3 (99.1)	38.9 (102.0)	44.9 (112.8)	46.3 (115.3)	48.9 (120.0)
Mean daily maximum °C (°F)	30.8 (87.4)	29.6 (85.3)	27.6 (81.7)	24.7 (76.5)	21.2 (70.2)	18.2 (64.8)	18.1 (64.6)	20.0 (68.0)	23.4 (74.1)	25.9 (78.6)	27.5 (81.5)	29.7 (85.5)	24.7 (76.5)
Mean daily minimum °C (°F)	18.6 (65.5)	18.5 (65.3)	16.8 (62.2)	13.1 (55.6)	9.2 (48.6)	6.8 (44.2)	5.4 (41.7)	6.2 (43.2)	9.3 (48.7)	12.3 (54.1)	15.0 (59.0)	17.0 (62.6)	12.4 (54.2)
Record low °C (°F)	10.6 (51.1)	11.6 (52.9)	8.3 (46.9)	3.6 (38.5)	0.6 (33.1)	−1.1 (30.0)	−1.8 (28.8)	−0.5 (31.1)	2.2 (36.0)	5.0 (41.0)	6.8 (44.2)	9.8 (49.6)	−1.8 (28.8)
Average rainfall mm (inches)	95.1 (3.74)	118.8 (4.68)	104.7 (4.12)	50.2 (1.98)	35.2 (1.39)	45.2 (1.78)	37.2 (1.46)	30.8 (1.21)	31.7 (1.25)	54.9 (2.16)	83.5 (3.29)	65.0 (2.56)	752.3 (29.62)
Average rainy days (≥ 1.0 mm)	7.8	8.4	8.6	5.9	4.2	5.5	4.3	3.4	4.8	5.4	7.7	7.3	73.3
Average afternoon relative humidity (%)	47	53	52	49	52	55	50	41	40	41	46	45	48
Average dew point °C (°F)	14.7 (58.5)	16.2 (61.2)	14.4 (57.9)	10.8 (51.4)	8.9 (48.0)	7.2 (45.0)	5.2 (41.4)	3.9 (39.0)	6.2 (43.2)	7.5 (45.5)	10.8 (51.4)	12.6 (54.7)	9.9 (49.8)
Source: Bureau of Meteorology (temperatures, humidity and rainfall)

== Population ==
=== Demographics ===
Historical population
Year	Pop.	±%
2001	11,563	—
2006	11,396	−1.4%
2011	11,813	+3.7%
2016	13,295	+12.5%
2021	17,966	+35.1%

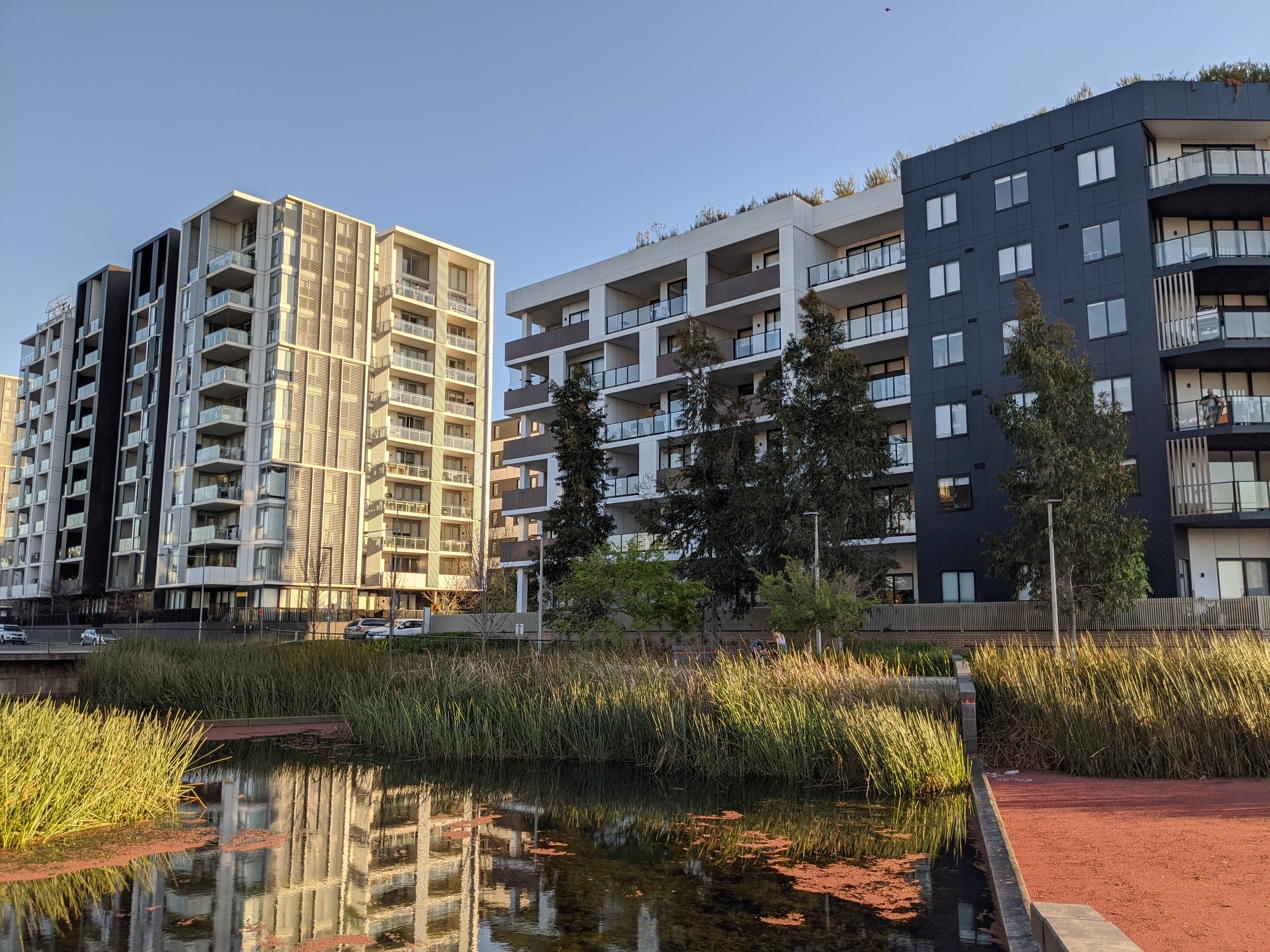
Apartments close to Penrith station

In the 2021 census, Penrith recorded a population of 17,966 people. Of these:

- Age distribution: The median age was 36 years compared to the national median of 38. Children aged under 15 years made up 14.9% of the population compared to the national average of 18.2% and people aged 65 years and over made up 17.1% of the population compared to the national average of 17.2%.
- Aboriginal and Torres Strait Islander population: Aboriginal and Torres Strait Islander people made up 6.2% of the population of Penrith compared to the national average of 3.2%.
- Ethnic diversity : 65.8% of people were born in Australia, compared to the national average of 66.9%; the next most common countries of birth were England 2.9%, India 2.7%, the Philippines 2.2%, New Zealand 2.0% and China (excluding SARs and Taiwan) 1.7%. 71.9% of people only spoke English at home. Other languages spoken at home included Mandarin 1.7%, Tagalog 1.0%, Hindi 0.9%, Korean 0.8% and Arabic 0.8%.
- Religion : The most common responses for religion were No Religion 35.1%, Catholic 20.7%, Anglican 12.3 and Christian, not further defined 3.1%.
- Finances: The median household weekly income was $1,397, compared to the national median of $1,746. This difference is also reflected in real estate, with the median mortgage repayment being $1,783 per month, compared to the national median of $1,863.
- Housing: Nearly half (36.0%) of occupied private dwellings were separate houses, 20.4% were semi-detached (row or terrace houses, townhouses etc.) and 43.4% were flats, units or apartments.

== Notable residents ==
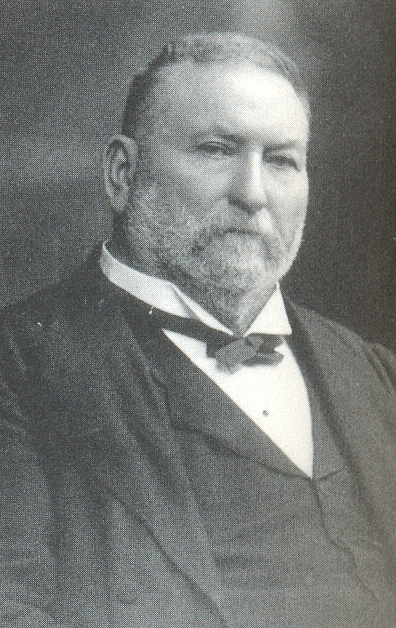
Thomas Bent

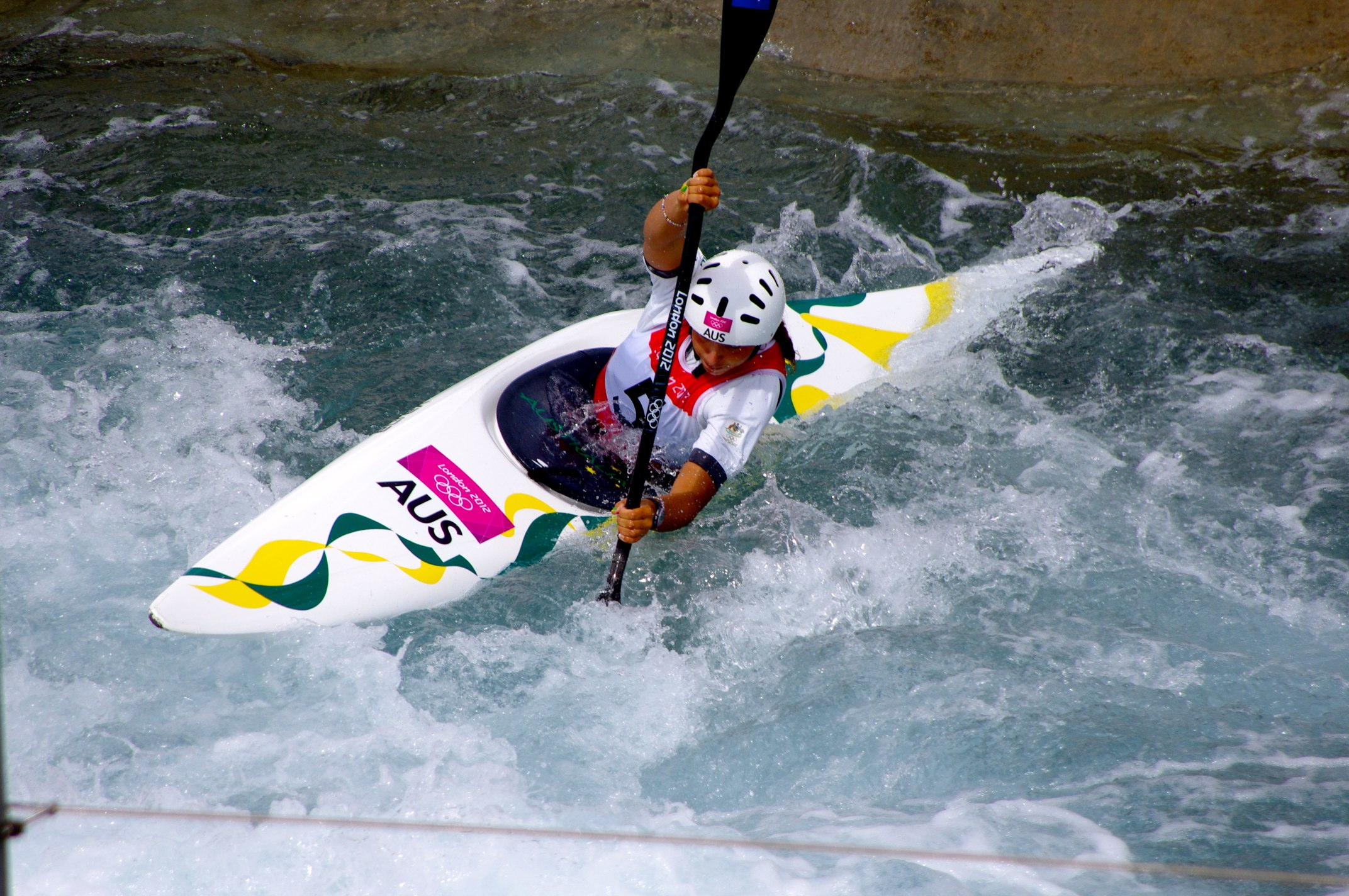
Jessica Fox

- Jason Arnberger (b. 1972), cricketer
- Richie Benaud (1930−2015), cricketer and commentator
- Thomas Bent (1838−1909), 22nd Premier of Victoria 1904 to 1909, born in Penrith
- Nathan Bracken (b. 1977), Australian cricketer
- David Bradbury (b. 1976), former Federal Member of Lindsay, and former Mayor of Penrith
- Yvette D'Ath (b. 1970), Attorney General of Queensland
- Jason Dundas (b. 1981), television presenter
- George Ellis (b. 1964), composer
- Mick Fanning (b. 1981), surfing world champion 2007
- Jessica Fox (b. 1994), French-born Australian slalom canoer, Olympic gold medallist, world championships gold medalist
- Mark Geyer (b. 1967), Australian rugby league footballer who played in the 1980s and 1990s, and a media identity.
- Michael Hartley (b. 1993), Australian rules footballer
- John Hastings (b. 1985), former Australian Test and ODI cricketer
- Bill Howell (1869−1940), cricketer
- Tony Jones (b. 1961), sports journalist based in Melbourne.
- Ahmad Akbar Khan (born 1984), Australian born Pakistani footballer
- Ken Kearney (1924−2006) Dual international rugby player, Australian Test and St George premiership-winning captain-coach.
- Simon Keen (b. 1987), Australian U19s cricketer
- Jennifer Maiden (b. 1949), poet
- Nic Naitanui (b. 1990), Australian rules footballer, born in Penrith
- Evelyn Grace Ione Nowland (1887–1974), nurse and trade unionist
- Dominic Purcell (b. 1970), actor, best known for his role as Lincoln Burrows in 2000's Golden Globe award-winning TV series Prison Break.
- James Tobias (Toby) Ryan businessman, politician (Nepean Electorate)
- Ben St Lawrence (b. 1981), Olympic long-distance runner
- Kent "Smallzy" Small (b. 1984), radio presenter for Nova FM
- Brad Smith (b. 1994), football player
- Grigor Taylor (b. 1943), 1970s TV actor
- Ray Watson, (1922−2010), judge who reformed family law to create no-fault divorce.
- Alan Whiticker (b. 1958), non-fiction author
- Numerous rugby league players including Ben Alexander (1971–1992), Greg Alexander, Mark Carroll, John Cartwright, Nathan Cleary, Kurt Falls, Craig Gower, Des Hasler, Liam Ison, Luke Lewis, Soni Luke, Luke Rooney, Tim Sheens, and Joseph Sua'ali'i.

== Twin towns – sister cities ==
Penrith is twinned with:

- Fujieda, Shizuoka, Japan – a Sister City since 1984
- (United Kingdom) Penrith, Cumbria, England – a Sister City since 1989
- (South Korea) Gangseo District, Seoul, Republic of Korea – a Friendship City since 1994
- Xicheng District, Beijing, China – under a Mutual Co-operation Agreement since 1998
- Kunshan, China – under a Mutual Co-operation Agreement since 2003
- Hakusan, Ishikawa, Japan – a Friendship City since 2005
