= City of Penrith =

- Local government area
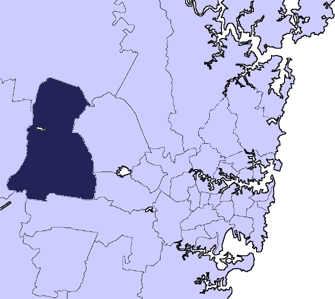
- Location in Metropolitan Sydney

- Interactive map of City of Penrith
- Coordinates: 33°45′S 150°42′E
- Country: Australia
- State: New South Wales
- Region: Greater Western Sydney
- Established: 12 May 1871 (Municipality); 21 October 1959 (City)
- Council seat: Civic Centre, Penrith

Government
  - Mayor: Todd Carney
  - State electorates: Badgerys Creek; Londonderry; Penrith; Wollondilly
  - Federal divisions: Hume; Lindsay; McMahon

Area
  - Total: 404.9 km^{2} (156.3 sq mi)

Population
  - Total: 217,664 (2021 census) (24th)
  - Density: 537.57/km^{2} (1,392.31/sq mi)
- Time zone: UTC+10 (AEST)
  - Summer (DST): UTC+11 (AEDT)
- Website: City of Penrith
LGAs around City of Penrith
Hawkesbury	Hawkesbury	Hawkesbury
Blue Mountains	City of Penrith	Blacktown
Wollondilly	Liverpool	Fairfield

The City of Penrith is a local government area in the state of New South Wales, Australia. The seat of the city is located in Penrith, located within Sydney about 50 kilometres (31 mi) west of Sydney central business district. It occupies part of the traditional lands of the Darug people. First incorporated as a municipality on 12 May 1871, on 1 January 1949, the municipalities of Penrith, St Marys and Castlereagh and part of the Nepean Shire amalgamated to form a new Municipality of Penrith. Penrith was declared a City on 21 October 1959, and expanded westwards to include Emu Plains and Emu Heights, formerly part of the City of Blue Mountains, on 25 October 1963. As of the 2021 census the City of Penrith had an estimated population of 217,664. It is a member council of the Hawkesbury River County Council.

The mayor of the City of Penrith is Todd Carney, a member of the Labor Party (no relation to the NRL player).

== Suburbs and localities in the local government area ==
The following suburbs and localities are located within the City of Penrith:

- Agnes Banks (shared with the City of Hawkesbury)
- Badgerys Creek (shared with the City of Liverpool)
- Berkshire Park
- Caddens
- Cambridge Gardens
- Cambridge Park
- Castlereagh
- Claremont Meadows
- Colyton
- Cranebrook
- Emu Heights
- Emu Plains
- Erskine Park
- Glenmore Park
- Jamisontown
- Jordan Springs
- Kemps Creek (shared with Liverpool)
- Kingswood
- Leonay
- Llandilo
- Londonderry
- Luddenham (shared with Liverpool)
- Mount Vernon
- Mulgoa
- North St Marys
- Orchard Hills
- Oxley Park
- Penrith
- Regentville
- St Clair
- St Marys (shared with City of Blacktown)
- Shanes Park (shared with City of Blacktown)
- South Penrith
- Wallacia (shared with Liverpool and Wollondilly Shire)
- Werrington
- Werrington County
- Werrington Downs

== Council history ==
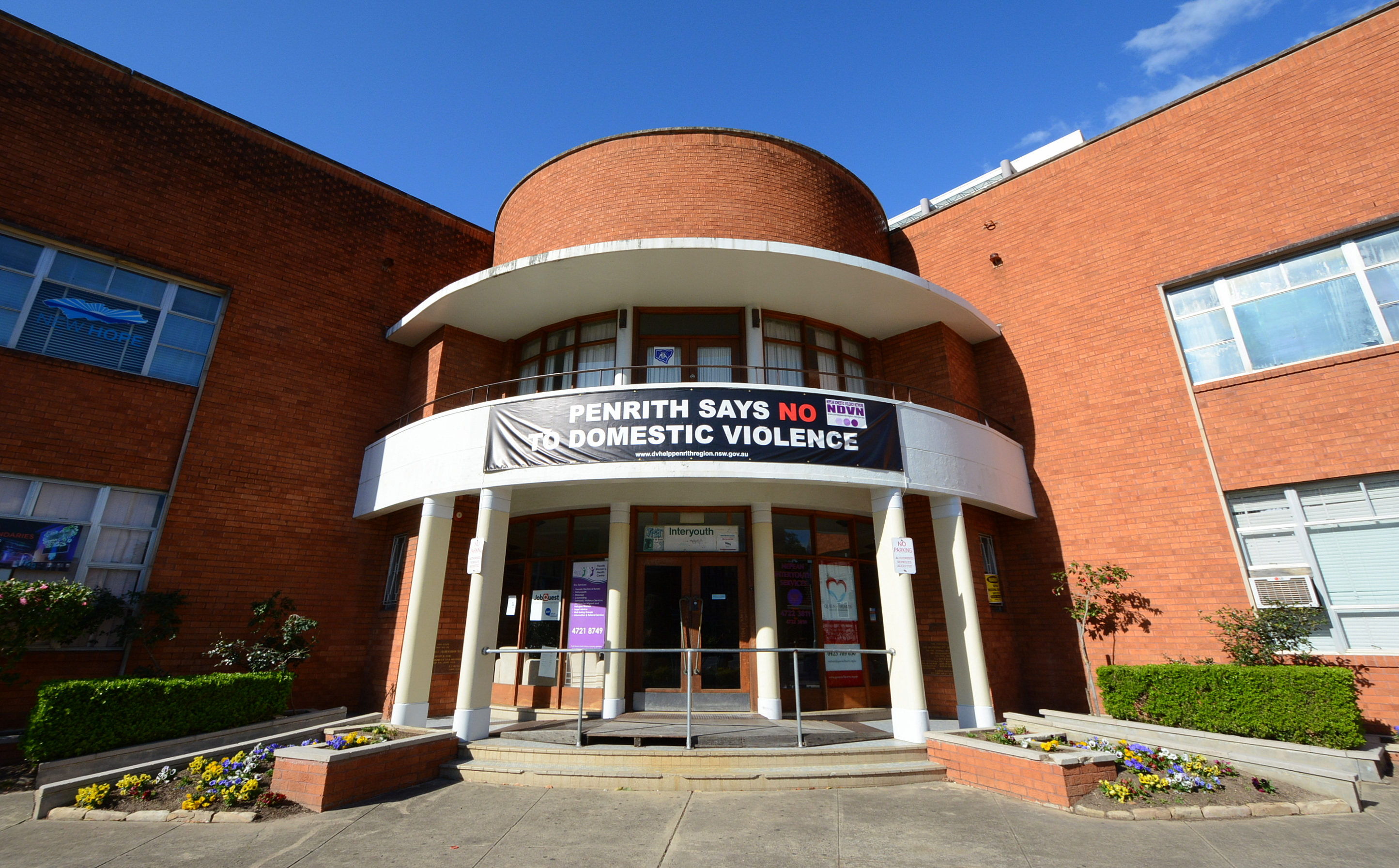
Penrith Community Centre, on the corner of Henry and Station streets, was the Penrith Council Chambers from November 1959 to December 1993.

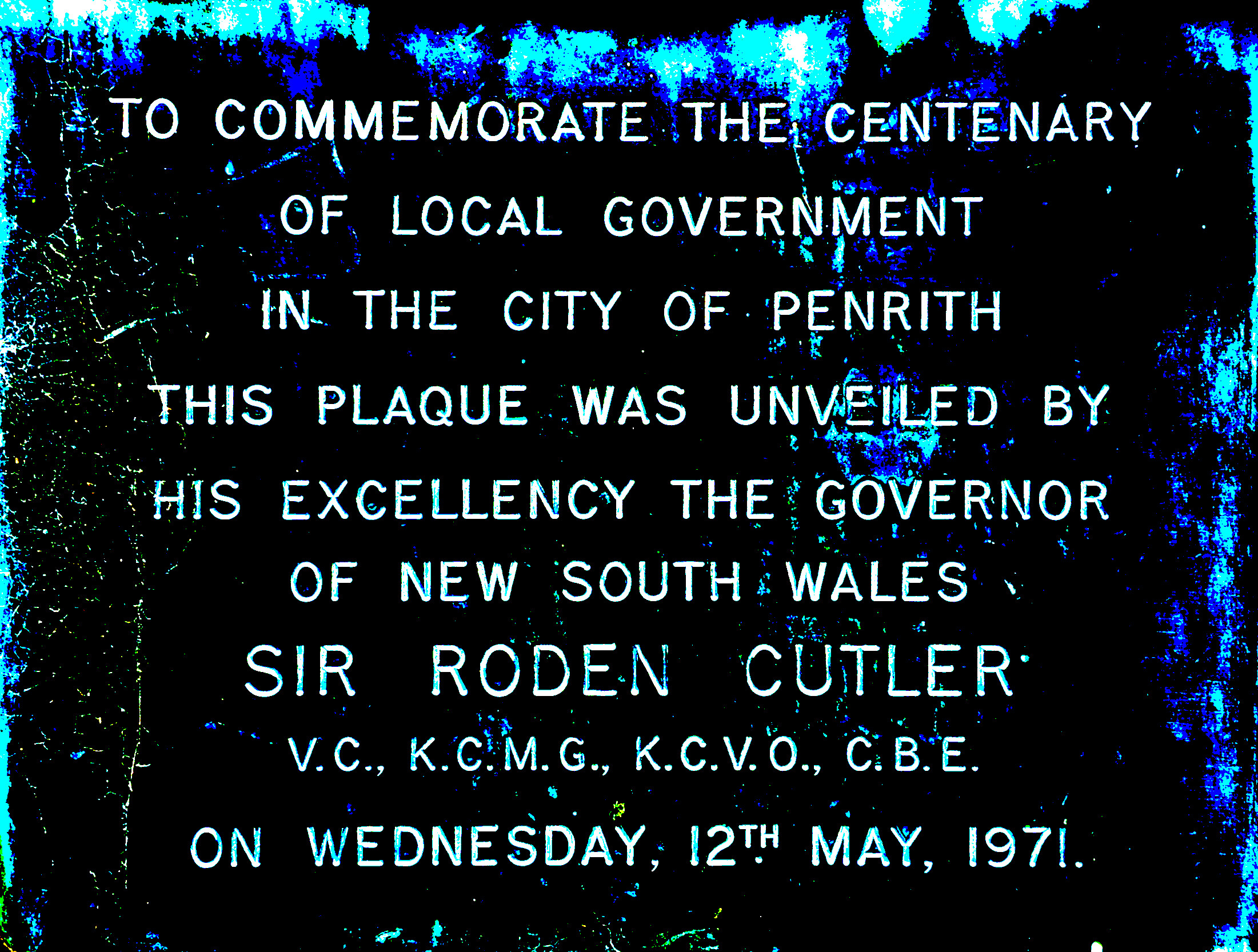
Plaque commemorating the Penrith municipal centenary unveiled on the Penrith Council Chambers by Governor Sir Roden Cutler.

The Municipality of Penrith was incorporated on 12 May 1871 under the Municipalities Act 1858 (NSW). On 3 March 1890, St Marys was separately incorporated, and on 26 July 1893 and 9 September 1895, Mulgoa and Castlereagh followed respectively. In 1913, Mulgoa became the "A" Riding of the neighbouring Nepean Shire.

On 1 January 1949, under the Local Government (Areas) Act 1948, the Municipalities of Penrith, St Marys and Castlereagh and A Riding of the Nepean Shire amalgamated to form a new Municipality of Penrith. It was declared a City on 21 October 1959, and expanded westwards to include Emu Plains and Emu Heights, formerly part of the City of Blue Mountains, on 25 October 1963.

== Demographics ==
At the 2021 census, there were 217,644 people in the Penrith local government area, of these 49.4% were male and 50.6% were female. Aboriginal and Torres Strait Islander people made up 5% of the population; notably above the national average of 3.4%. The median age of people in the City of Penrith was 35 years; notably below the national median of 39 years. Children aged 0 – 14 years made up 21.2% of the population and people aged 65 years and over made up 12.9% of the population. Of people in the area aged 15 years and over, 45.5% were married and 12.3% were either divorced or separated.

Population growth in the City of Penrith between the 2001 Census and the 2006 census was 0.15% and in the subsequent five years to the 2011 census, population growth was 3.68%. When compared with total population growth of Australia for the same periods, being 5.78% and 8.32% respectively, population growth in the Penrith local government area was significantly lower than the national average. The median weekly income for residents within the City of Penrith was on with par with the national average.

At the 2021 census, the proportion of residents in the Penrith local government area who stated their ancestry as Australian or Anglo-Saxon exceeded 63.5% of all residents (national average was 58.4%). In excess of 28.7% of all residents in the City of Penrith area nominated a religious affiliation with Christianity at the 2021 census, which was fairly higher than the national average of 20%. Meanwhile, as at the Census date, compared to the national average, households in the Penrith local government area had a marginally lower than average proportion (23.9%) where two or more languages are spoken (national average was 24.8%); and a higher proportion (74.2%) where English only was spoken at home (national average was 72%).

Selected historical census data for Penrith local government area						
Census year		2001	2006	2011	2016	2021
Population	Estimated residents on census night	171,870	172,140	178,467	196,066	217,644
Population	LGA rank in terms of size within New South Wales		7th	▼8th	13th	9th
Population	% of New South Wales population			2.58%	2.63%	2.67%
Population	% of Australian population	0.92%	▼0.87%	▼0.83%	0.84%	0.85%
Cultural and language diversity						
Ancestry, top responses	Australian			29.1%	26.3%	33.3%
Ancestry, top responses	English			25.2%	24.5%	30.2%
Ancestry, top responses	Irish			6.8%	7.2%	8.2%
Ancestry, top responses	Scottish			5.3%	5.5%	6.7%
Ancestry, top responses	Maltese			3.0%	2.8%	
Language, top responses (other than English)	Arabic	1.3%	▲1.5%	▲1.6%	1.6%	1.8%
Language, top responses (other than English)	Tagalog	1.3%	▼0.8%	▲1.0%	1.1%	1.2%
Language, top responses (other than English)	Italian	1.0%	▼0.9%	▼0.8%	0.9%	
Language, top responses (other than English)	Maltese	0.8%	0.8%	0.8%	0.7%	
Language, top responses (other than English)	Hindi	0.6%	▲0.7%	▲0.8%	0.9%	1.1%
Religious affiliation						
Religious affiliation, top responses	Catholic	34.5%	▲34.9%	▲35.2%	32.1%	28.7%
Religious affiliation, top responses	Anglican	26.1%	▼24.7%	▼23.6%	18.4%	13.1%
Religious affiliation, top responses	No religion	9.8%	▲11.9%	▲14.0%	21.1%	28.9%
Religious affiliation, top responses	Presbyterian and Reformed	3.4%	▼3.1%	▼2.9%		
Religious affiliation, top responses	Uniting Church	3.7%	▼3.1%	▼2.7%		
Median weekly incomes						
Personal income	Median weekly personal income		A$517	A$623	A$728	A$866
Personal income	% of Australian median income		110.9%	108.0%	109.6%	106.52%
Family income	Median weekly family income		A$1,147	A$1,582	A$1,858	A$2188
Family income	% of Australian median income		111.7%	106.8%	107.1%	100.14%
Household income	Median weekly household income		A$1,285	A$1,398	A$1,658	A$1903
Household income	% of Australian median income		109.7%	113.3%	111.5%	104.05%

== Council ==
City of Penrith Council

Leadership
- Mayor: Todd Carney (Labor)
- Deputy Mayor: Ross Fowler OAM (Liberal)

Structure
- Seats: 15 councillors
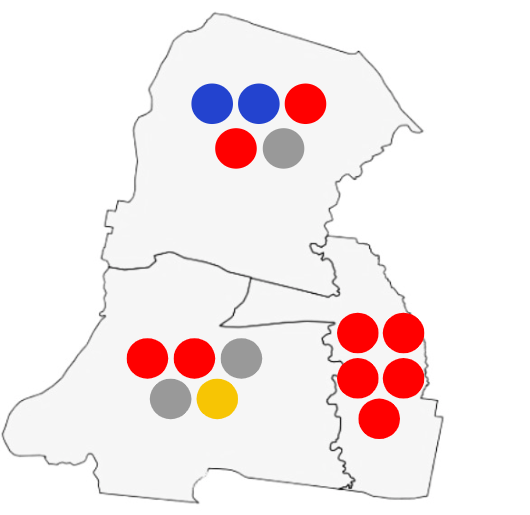
- Map of elected councillors by party in each of the 3 wards
- Political groups: Majority (9): Labor (9); Others (6) Independent (3) Liberal (2) Libertarian (1)

Elections
- Voting system: Single transferable vote
- Last election: 14 September 2024
- Next election: 16 September 2028

Penrith City Council is composed of fifteen councillors elected proportionally as three separate wards, each electing five councillors. All councillors are elected for a fixed four-year term of office. The mayor is elected by the councillors at the first meeting of the council for a two-year term, while the deputy mayor is elected for a single-year term only.

=== Current composition ===
The most recent election was held on 14 September 2024. The Composition by ward is as follows:

Ward	Councillor	Party	Notes
East Ward	Libby Austin	Labor	
East Ward	Todd Carney	Labor	Mayor 2023–Present; Deputy Mayor 2022–2023
East Ward	Sarbjeet Kaur	Labor	
East Ward	Edwin Misfud	Labor	
East Ward	Garion Thain	Labor	
North Ward	John Thain	Labor	Mayor 2005–2006, 2016–2018; Deputy Mayor 2004–2005
North Ward	Robin Cook	Labor	
North Ward	Ross Fowler OAM	Liberal	Mayor 1995–1996, 2013–2015, 2018–2020; Deputy Mayor 2015–2016, 2024—Present
North Ward	Reece Nuttall	Liberal	
North Ward	Glenn Gardiner	Independent	
South Ward	Hollie Mclean	Labor	
South Ward	Kirstie Boerst	Labor	
South Ward	Vanessa Pollak	Libertarian	
South Ward	Sue Day	Independent	
South Ward	Faithe Skinner	Independent	

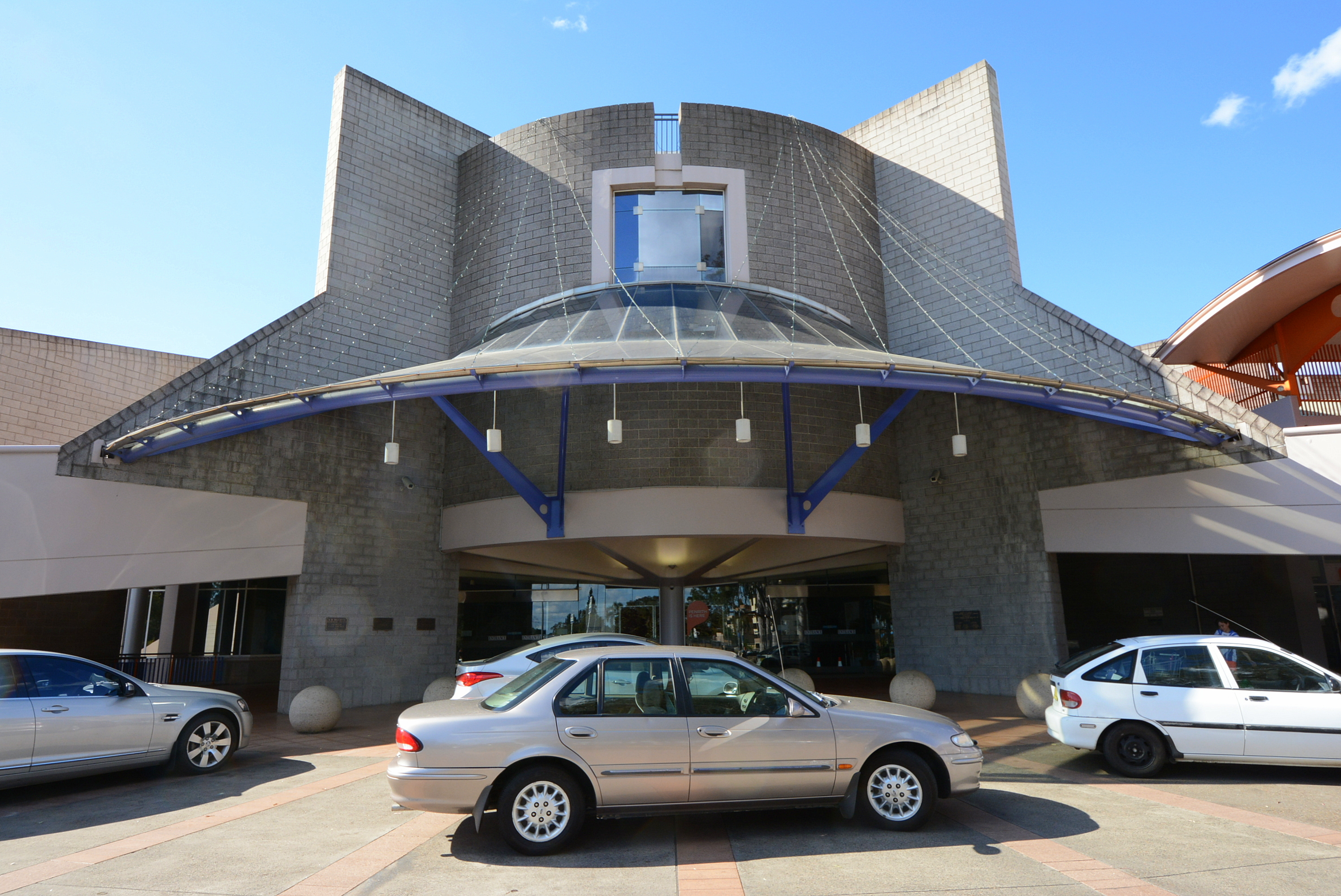
Penrith Civic Centre, designed by Feiko Bouman on 601 High Street, has been the council seat since December 1993.

=== Election methods ===
Term	Aldermen/Councillors	Wards	Mayor
1871–1891	9	No wards	Annual election by Aldermen
1891–1893	12	No wards	Annual election by Aldermen
1893–1948	9	No wards	Annual election by Aldermen
1949–1950	24	Ward One (9, Penrith); Ward Two (9, St Marys); Ward Three (3, Nepean); Ward Four (3, Castlereagh)	Annual election by Aldermen
1950–1959	12 (3 per ward)	Ward One; Ward Two; Ward Three; Ward Four	Annual election by Aldermen
1959–1963	13 (3 per ward: 12 Aldermen, 1 Mayor)	Ward One; Ward Two; Ward Three; Ward Four	Direct triennial election
1963–1968	13 (4 per ward: 12 Aldermen, 1 Mayor)	North Ward; South Ward; East Ward	Direct triennial election
1968–1987	12 (4 per ward)	North Ward; South Ward; East Ward	Annual election by Aldermen/Councillors
1987–date	15 (5 per ward)	North Ward; South Ward; East Ward	Annual election by Aldermen/Councillors

== Election results ==
=== 2024 ===
2024 Penrith City Council election: Ward results
Party	Votes	%	Swing	Seats	Change
Labor	26,544	33.9	−0.6	9	▲4
Independents	31,490	26.9	−2.9	3	▼1
Liberal	15,303	19.5	−13.8	2	▼4
Libertarian	11,849	15.1	+15.1	1	▲1
Greens	3,522	4.5	+4.5	0	Steady
Formal votes	78,282	91.6			
Informal votes	7,221	8.4			
Total	85,503	100.0		15	
Registered voters / turnout	151,015	83.7 (Note: Turnout for contested wards only.)			

=== 2021 ===
The election was conducted by the Australian Election Company.

2021 New South Wales local elections: Penrith
Party	Votes	%	Swing	Seats	Change
Labor	36,376	34.5	–6.2	5	
Liberal	35,081	33.3	+2.9	6	
Independent	10,336	9.8			
Sue Day Independent	6,859	6.5		1	
The North Ward Independents	5,820	5.5		1	
MARCUS CORNISH	3,868	3.7			
WE DESERVE BETTER	3,073	2.9		1	
Australia First	2,549	2.4	+2.4		
People Before Politics	1,534	1.5			
Formal votes	105,496				

== Mayors ==
Mayor	Party	Term	Notes
Patros Athanas Tornaros	Labor	1 January 1949 – 5 December 1949	
Bill Chapman	Independent	5 December 1949 – 11 December 1956	
Bernard Noel Fowler	Independent	11 December 1956 – 11 December 1957	
Leo Joseph Spies	Labor	11 December 1957 – 19 April 1961	
Bill Chapman	Independent	3 June 1961 – December 1968	
Ron Mulock	Labor	December 1968 – September 1971	
Brian King	Independent	September 1971 – September 1974	
Eileen Cammack OBE	Independent	September 1974 – September 1977	
Brian King AM	Independent	September 1977 – September 1985	
Kevin Dwyer OAM	Independent	September 1985 – September 1987	
Rodney Field	Independent	September 1987 – September 1988	
Kevin Dwyer OAM	Independent	September 1988 – September 1989	
Brian King AM	Independent	September 1989 – September 1990	
Faye Lo Po' AM	Labor	September 1990 – September 1991	
Tony Aquilina	Labor	September 1991 – September 1992	
Bill Gayed	Independent	September 1992 – September 1993	
Diane Beamer	Labor	September 1993 – September 1994	
Pat Sheehy	Labor	September 1994 – September 1995	
Ross Fowler	Independent	September 1995 – September 1996	
Kevin Crameri OAM	Independent	September 1996 – September 1997	
Kevin Dwyer OAM	Independent	September 1997 – September 1998	
John Bateman OAM	Independent	September 1998 – September 2000	
David Bradbury	Labor	September 2000 – September 2001	
Pat Sheehy	Labor	September 2001 – September 2002	
Greg Davies	Labor	September 2002 – April 2004	
David Bradbury	Labor	April 2004 – September 2004	
Jackie Greenow	Independent	September 2004 – September 2005	
John Thain	Labor	September 2005 – September 2006	
Pat Sheehy AM	Labor	September 2006 – September 2007	
Greg Davies	Labor	September 2007 – September 2008	
Jim Aitken OAM	Independent	September 2008 – September 2009	
Kevin Crameri OAM	Independent	September 2009 – September 2011	
Greg Davies	Labor	September 2011 – September 2012	
Mark Davies	Liberal	September 2012 – 23 September 2013	
Ross Fowler OAM	Liberal	23 September 2013 – September 2015	
Karen McKeown OAM	Labor	September 2015 – 26 September 2016	
John Thain	Labor	26 September 2016 – 24 September 2018	
Ross Fowler OAM	Liberal	24 September 2018 – 28 September 2020	
Karen McKeown OAM	Labor	28 September 2020 – 13 January 2022	
Tricia Hitchen	Liberal	13 January 2022 – October 2023	
Todd Carney	Labor	October 2023 – present	

== Media ==
The City of Penrith is served by a weekly newspaper, The Western Weekender, which was founded in 1991. It produces a print edition each Friday as well as a digital news service. The newspaper is independently owned.

== Waste management ==
Non-putrescible waste generated within the City of Penrith is primarily disposed of at Elizabeth Drive Landfill in Kemps Creek, which is operated by Cleanaway. The Lucas Heights landfill or other transfer stations are used for Penrith's red-bin waste only in the event of access issues or other emergencies affecting Elizabeth Drive Landfill.

== Sister cities ==
Since it signed its first agreement with Fujieda, Japan in 1984, Penrith City has gradually expanded its sister cities and international links programme. Presently Penrith has links with:

- (United Kingdom) Penrith, Cumbria, England – Sister City
- Fujieda City, Shizuoka Prefecture, Japan – Sister City
- Hakusan City (incorporating Matto City), Ishikawa Prefecture, Japan – Friendship City
- Kunshan, Jiangsu Province, China – Friendship City
- Xicheng District of Beijing City, China – Mutual Co-operation Agreement
- (South Korea) Gangseo-gu, Seoul, Republic of Korea – Mutual Co-operation Agreement

== Heritage listings ==
The City of Penrith has a number of heritage-listed sites, including:

- Agnes Banks, Rickards Avenue: Agnes Bank Natural Area
- Castlereagh, Castlereagh Road: Upper Castlereagh Public School
- Emu Plains, Main Western railway: Emu Plains railway station
- Londonderry, 947–953 Londonderry Road: Fossil and Petrology collections, New South Wales
- Mulgoa, Fairlight Road: Fairlight Homestead
- Mulgoa, Mulgoa Road: Fernhill, Mulgoa
- Mulgoa, 754–760 Mulgoa Road: Glenmore, Mulgoa
- Mulgoa, St Thomas Road: St Thomas' Anglican Church, Mulgoa
- Mulgoa, 2 St Thomas Road: Cox's Cottage
- Penrith, 34–40 Borec Road: Craithes House
- Penrith, 26 Coombes Drive: Torin Building
- Penrith, Great Western railway: Penrith railway station, Sydney
- Penrith, Nepean River, Great Western Highway: Victoria Bridge (Penrith)
- Penrith, Off Bruce Neale Dr, Steel Trusses 1.3 km past station: Emu Plains Underbridge
- Penrith, 1 Museum Drive: Penrith Museum of Fire, including the following:
  - Fire and Rescue NSW Heritage Fleet
  - NSW Fire Brigades No 10 Vehicle Number Plates
  - 1869 Shand Mason 7 inch Manual Fire Engine
  - 1891 Shand Mason Fire Engine
  - 1898 Shand Mason Curricle Ladders
  - 1909 Edward Smith Headquarters Switchboard
  - 1929 Ahrens Fox PS2 Fire Engine
  - 1939 Dennis Big 6 Fire Engine
  - 1942 Ford 21W Fire Brigade Mobile Canteen
- Regentville, 427 Mulgoa Road: Glenleigh Estate
- St Marys, Great Western Railway: St Marys railway station, Sydney
- St Marys, Mamre Road: Mamre, St Marys
- Werrington, Water Street: Rose Cottage and Early Slab Hut
