= World's Columbian Exposition =

1893 world's fair in Chicago, Illinois, US

1893 Chicago
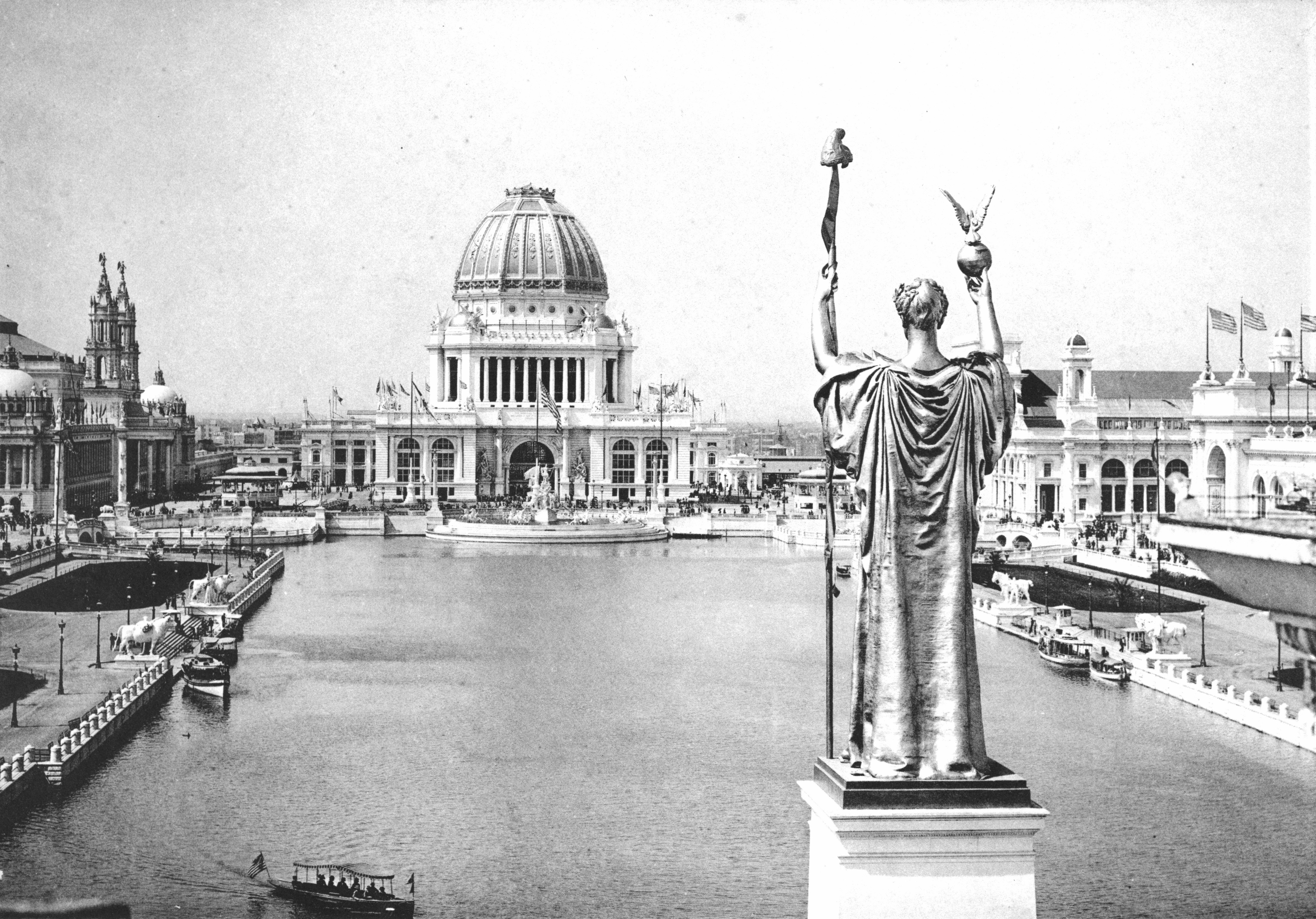
- Chicago World's Columbian Exposition and The Republic statue and administration building in 1893

Overview
- BIE-class: Universal exposition
- Category: Historical Expo
- Name: World's Columbian Exposition
- Area: 690 acres (280 hectares)
- Visitors: 27,300,000

Participant(s)
- Countries: 46

Location
- Country: United States
- City: Chicago
- Venue: Jackson Park and Midway Plaisance in Chicago
- Coordinates: 41°47′24″N 87°34′48″W

Timeline
- Bidding: 1882
- Awarded: 1890
- Opening: May 1, 1893; 133 years ago
- Closure: October 30, 1893; 133 years ago

Universal expositions
- Previous: Exposition Universelle (1889) in Paris
- Next: Brussels International (1897) in Brussels

The World's Columbian Exposition, also known as the Chicago World's Fair, was a world's fair held in Chicago from May 1 to October 30, 1893, to celebrate the 400th anniversary of Christopher Columbus's arrival in the New World in 1492. The centerpiece of the fair, held in Jackson Park, was a large water pool representing the voyage that Columbus took to the New World. Chicago won the right to host the fair over several competing cities, including New York City, Washington, D.C., and St. Louis. The exposition was an influential social and cultural event and had a profound effect on American architecture, the arts, American industrial optimism, and Chicago's image.

A highlight was that Nikola Tesla and George Westinghouse showcased their alternating current (AC) system, effectively winning the war of the currents against Thomas Edison's direct current (DC). The fair was the first all-electric, featuring over 200,000 lamps powered by Tesla's polyphase system, demonstrating its superior safety and efficiency for long-distance power distribution.

The layout of the Chicago Columbian Exposition was predominantly designed by John Wellborn Root, Daniel Burnham, Frederick Law Olmsted, and Charles B. Atwood. It was the prototype of what Burnham and his colleagues thought a city should be. It was designed to follow Beaux-Arts principles of design, namely neoclassical architecture principles based on symmetry, balance, and splendor. The color of the material generally used to cover the buildings' façades, white staff, gave the fairgrounds its nickname, the White City. Many prominent architects designed its 14 "great buildings". Artists and musicians were featured in exhibits and many also made depictions and works of art inspired by the exposition. One particularly notable attraction was the world's first Ferris wheel, standing at a height of 264 feet, which was designed to rival the Eiffel Tower built for the 1889 World's Fair four years earlier.

The exposition covered 690 acres (2.8 km^{2}), featuring nearly 200 new but temporary buildings of predominantly neoclassical architecture, canals and lagoons, and people and cultures from 46 countries. More than 27 million people attended the exposition during its six-month run. Its scale and grandeur far exceeded the other world's fairs, and it became a symbol of supposed American exceptionalism, much in the same way that the Great Exhibition became a symbol of the Victorian era United Kingdom.

Dedication ceremonies for the fair were held on October 21, 1892, but the fairgrounds were not opened to the public until May 1, 1893. The fair continued until October 30, 1893. In addition to recognizing the 400th anniversary of the Europeans' discovery of the New World, the fair served to show the world that Chicago had risen from the ashes of the Great Chicago Fire, which had destroyed much of the city in 1871.

On October 9, 1893, the day designated as Chicago Day, the fair set a world record for outdoor event attendance, drawing 751,026 people. The debt for the fair was soon paid off with a check for $1.5 million (equivalent to $53.8 million in 2025). Chicago has commemorated the fair with one of the stars on its municipal flag.

== History ==
=== Planning and organization ===
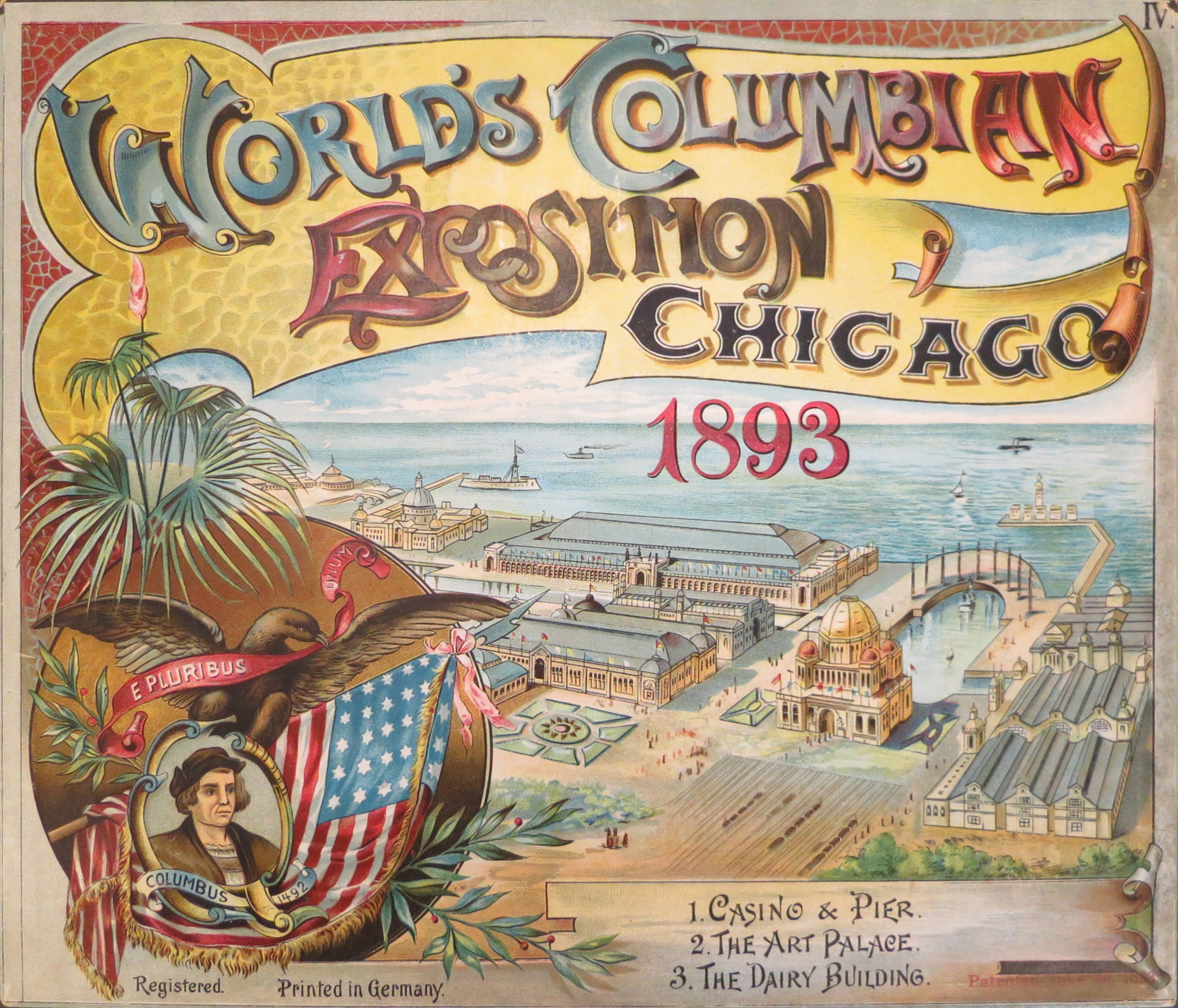
An advertisement for the Exposition, depicting a portrait of Christopher Columbus

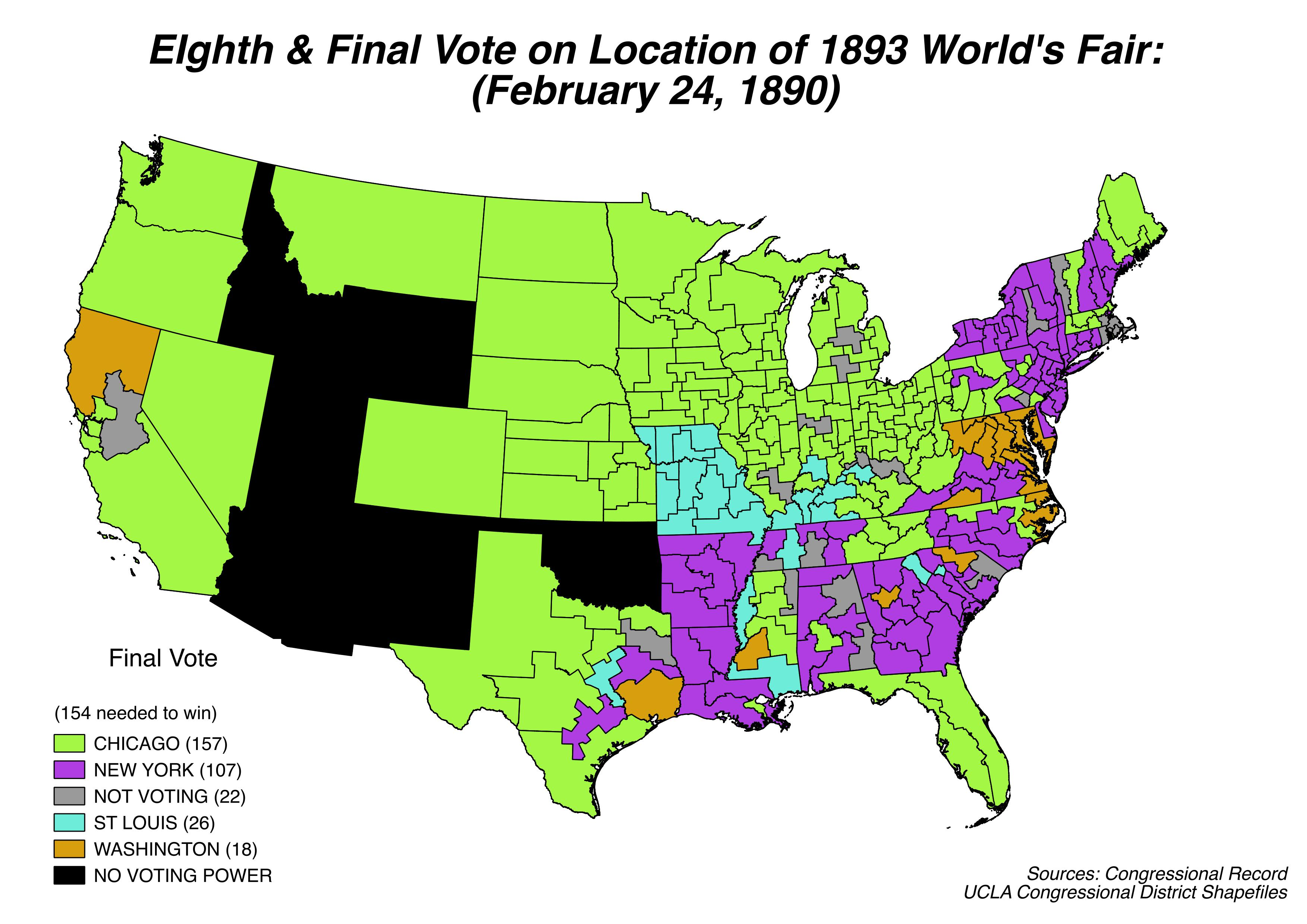
The regional vote breakdown of the eighth World's Fair location selection ballot in the United States House of Representatives

Many prominent civic, professional, and commercial leaders from around the United States helped finance, coordinate, and manage the fair, including Chicago shoe company owner Charles H. Schwab, Chicago railroad and manufacturing magnate John Whitfield Bunn, and Connecticut banking, insurance, and iron products magnate Milo Barnum Richardson, among many others.

The fair was planned in the early 1890s during the Gilded Age of rapid industrial growth, immigration, and class tension. World's fairs, such as London's 1851 Crystal Palace Exhibition, had been successful in Europe as a way to bring together societies fragmented along class lines.

The first American attempt at a world's fair in Philadelphia in 1876 drew crowds, but was a financial failure. Nonetheless, ideas about distinguishing the 400th anniversary of Columbus' landing started in the late 1880s. Civic leaders in St. Louis, New York City, Washington DC, and Chicago expressed interest in hosting a fair to generate profits, boost real estate values, and promote their cities. Congress was called on to decide the location. New York financiers J. P. Morgan, Cornelius Vanderbilt, and William Waldorf Astor, among others, pledged $15 million to finance the fair if Congress awarded it to New York, while Chicagoans Charles T. Yerkes, Marshall Field, Philip Armour, Gustavus Swift, and Cyrus McCormick, Jr., offered to finance a Chicago fair. What finally persuaded Congress was Chicago banker Lyman Gage, who raised several million additional dollars in a 24-hour period, over and above New York's final offer.

Chicago representatives not only fought for the world's fair for monetary reasons, but also for reasons of practicality. In a Senate hearing held in January 1890, representative Thomas Barbour Bryan argued that the most important qualities for a world's fair were "abundant supplies of good air and pure water", "ample space, accommodations and transportation for all exhibits and visitors". He argued that New York had too many obstructions, and Chicago would be able to use large amounts of land around the city where there was "not a house to buy and not a rock to blast" and that it would be located so that "the artisan and the farmer and the shopkeeper and the man of humble means" would be able to easily access the fair. Bryan continued to say that the fair was of "vital interest" to the West, and that the West wanted the location to be Chicago. The city spokesmen would continue to stress the essentials of a successful exposition and that only Chicago was fit to fill these exposition requirements.

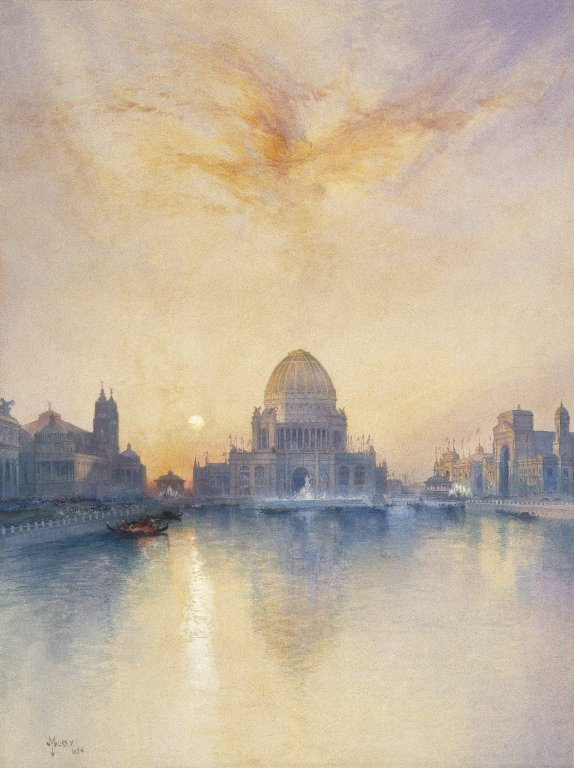
Thomas Moran – Chicago World's Fair – Brooklyn Museum painting of the Administration Building

The location of the fair was decided through several rounds of voting by the United States House of Representatives. The first ballot showed Chicago with a large lead over New York, St. Louis and Washington, D.C., but short of a majority. Chicago broke the 154-vote majority threshold on the eighth ballot, receiving 157 votes to New York's 107.

The exposition corporation and national exposition commission settled on Jackson Park and an area around it as the fair site. Daniel H. Burnham was selected as director of works, and George R. Davis as director-general. Burnham emphasized architecture and sculpture as central to the fair and assembled the period's top talent to design the buildings and grounds including Frederick Law Olmsted for the grounds. The temporary buildings were designed in an ornate neoclassical style and painted white, resulting in the fair site being referred to as the "White City".

The Exposition's offices set up shop in the upper floors of the Rand McNally Building on Adams Street, the world's first all-steel-framed skyscraper. Davis' team organized the exhibits with the help of G. Brown Goode of the Smithsonian. The Midway was inspired by the 1889 Paris Universal Exposition, which included ethnological "villages".

Civil rights leaders protested the refusal to include an African American exhibit. Frederick Douglass, Ida B. Wells, Irvine Garland Penn, and Ferdinand Lee Barnet co-authored a pamphlet entitled "The Reason Why the Colored American is not in the World's Columbian Exposition – The Afro-American's Contribution to Columbian Literature" addressing the issue. Wells and Douglass argued, "when it is asked why we are excluded from the World's Columbian Exposition, the answer is Slavery." Ten thousand copies of the pamphlet were circulated in the White City from the Haitian Embassy (where Douglass had been selected as its national representative), and the activists received responses from the delegations of England, Germany, France, Russia, and India.

The exhibition did include a limited number of exhibits put on by African Americans, including exhibits by the sculptor Edmonia Lewis, a painting exhibit by scientist George Washington Carver, and a statistical exhibit by Joan Imogen Howard. Black individuals were also featured in white exhibits, such as Nancy Green's portrayal of the character Aunt Jemima for the R. T. Davis Milling Company.

=== Operation ===
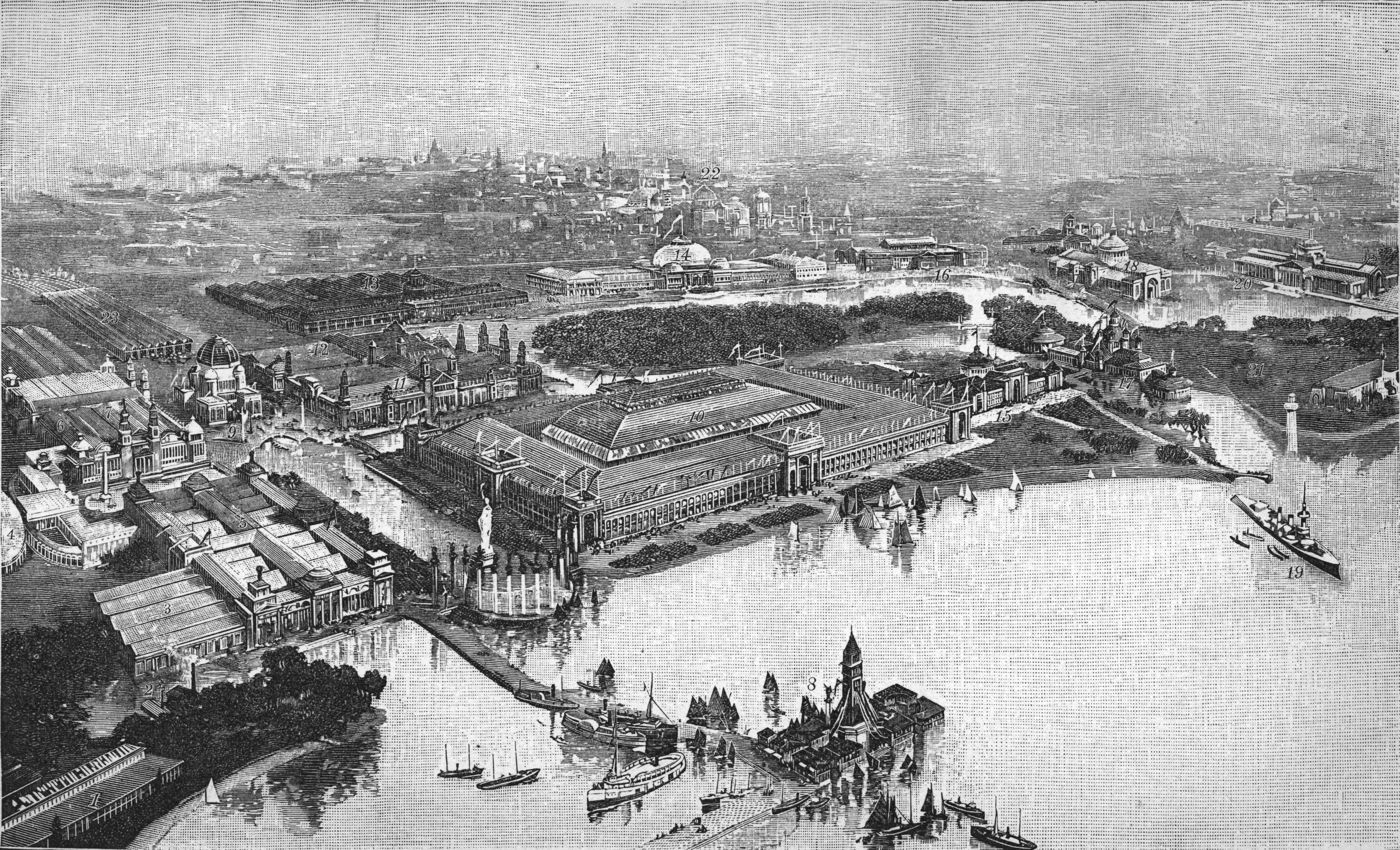
An aerial view of the exposition at Jackson Park in Brockhaus' encyclopedia

The fair opened in May and ran through October 30, 1893. Forty-six nations participated in the fair, which was the first world's fair to have national pavilions. They constructed exhibits and pavilions and named national "delegates"; for example, Haiti selected Frederick Douglass to be its delegate. The Exposition drew over 27 million visitors. The fair was originally meant to be closed on Sundays, but the Chicago Woman's Club petitioned that it stay open. The club felt that if the exposition was closed on Sunday, it would restrict those who could not take off work during the work-week from seeing it.

The exposition was located in Jackson Park and on the Midway Plaisance on 630 acres (2.5 km^{2}) in the neighborhoods of South Shore, Jackson Park Highlands, Hyde Park, and Woodlawn. Charles H. Wacker was the director of the fair. The layout of the fairgrounds was created by Frederick Law Olmsted, and the Beaux-Arts architecture of the buildings was under the direction of Daniel Burnham, Director of Works for the fair. Renowned local architect Henry Ives Cobb designed several buildings for the exposition. The director of the American Academy in Rome, Francis Davis Millet, directed the painted mural decorations. Indeed, it was a coming-of-age for the arts and architecture of the "American Renaissance", and it showcased the burgeoning neoclassical and Beaux-Arts styles.

=== Assassination of mayor and end of fair ===
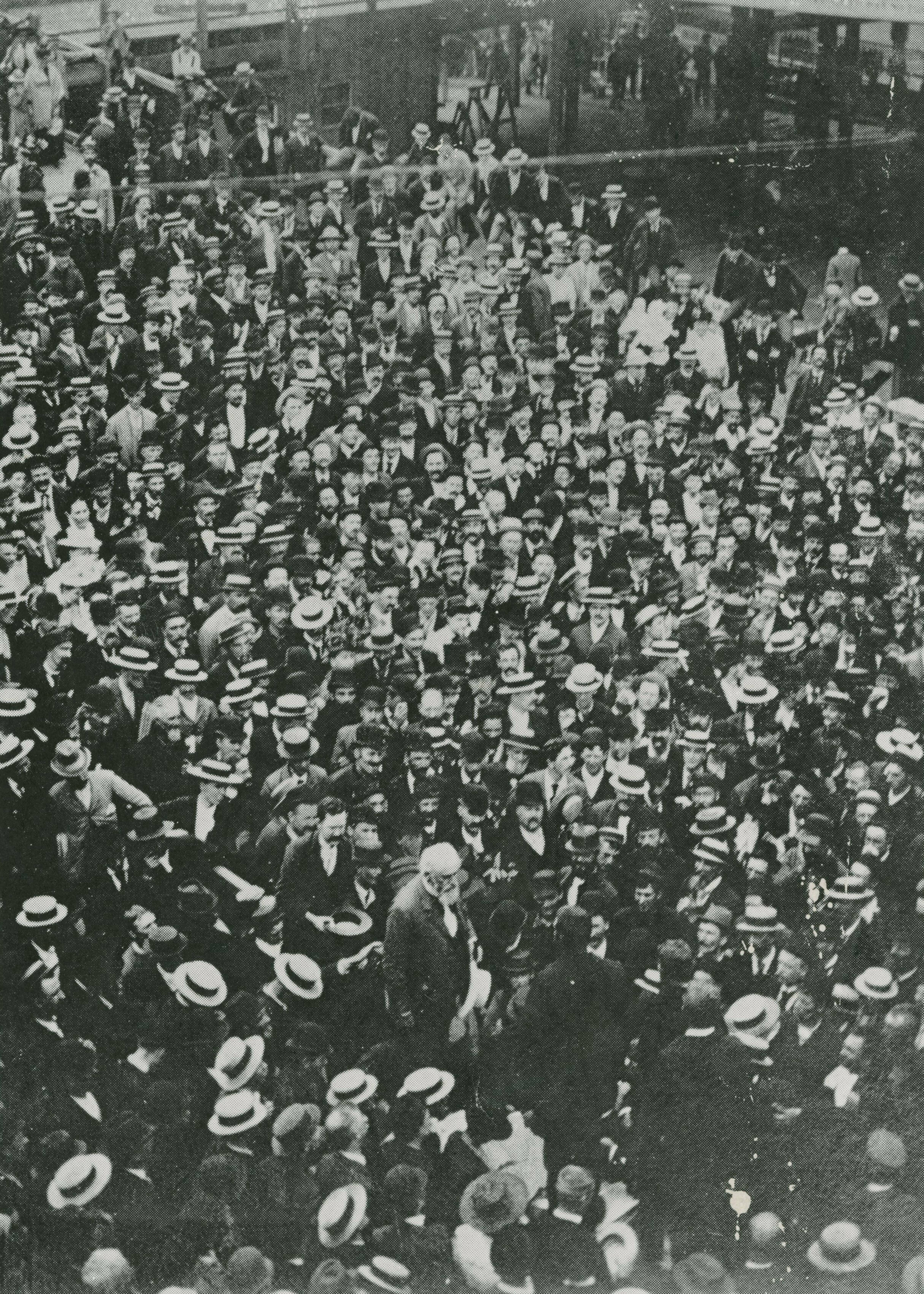
Photograph showing Carter Harrison III (mayor of Chicago) delivering a speech to crowd during "American Cities Day"

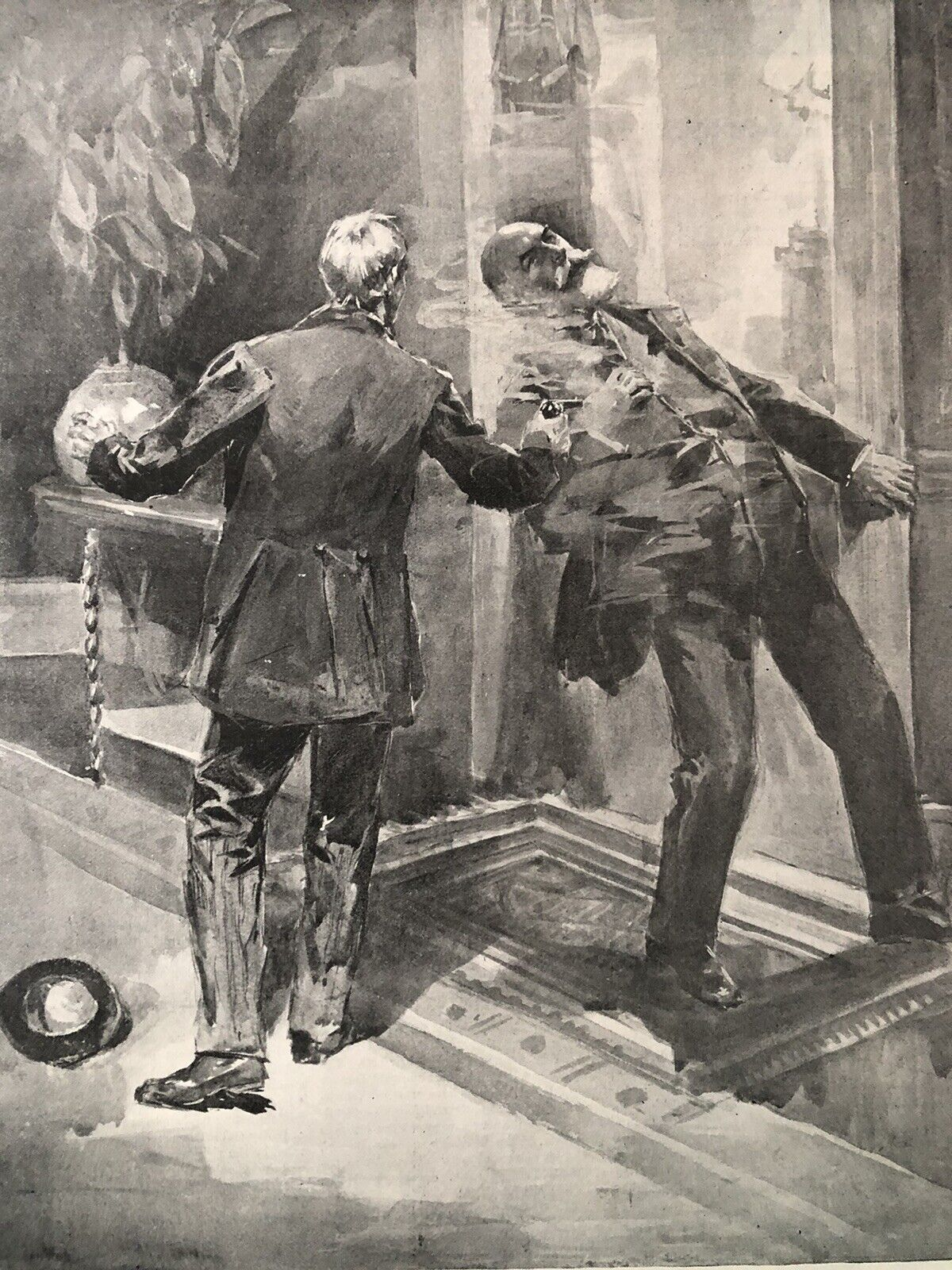
Illustration of Harrison's assassination by Patrick Eugene Prendergast later that day

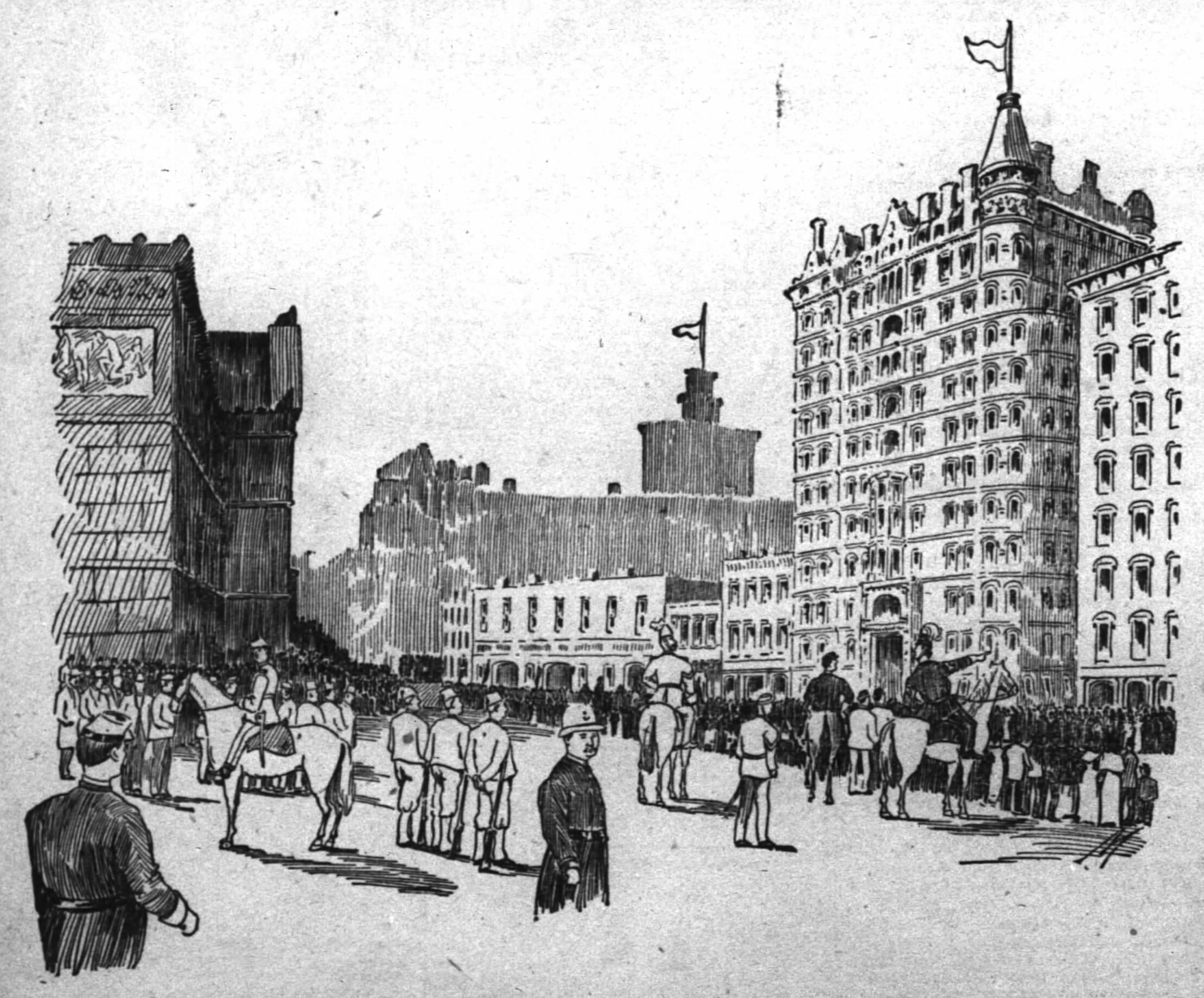
Illustration of the procession for Harrison's funeral traveling down Michigan Avenue on November 1 (after the close of the fair), with the Art Institute of Chicago Building (built for the fair) at the left and the Auditorium Building visible in the far back

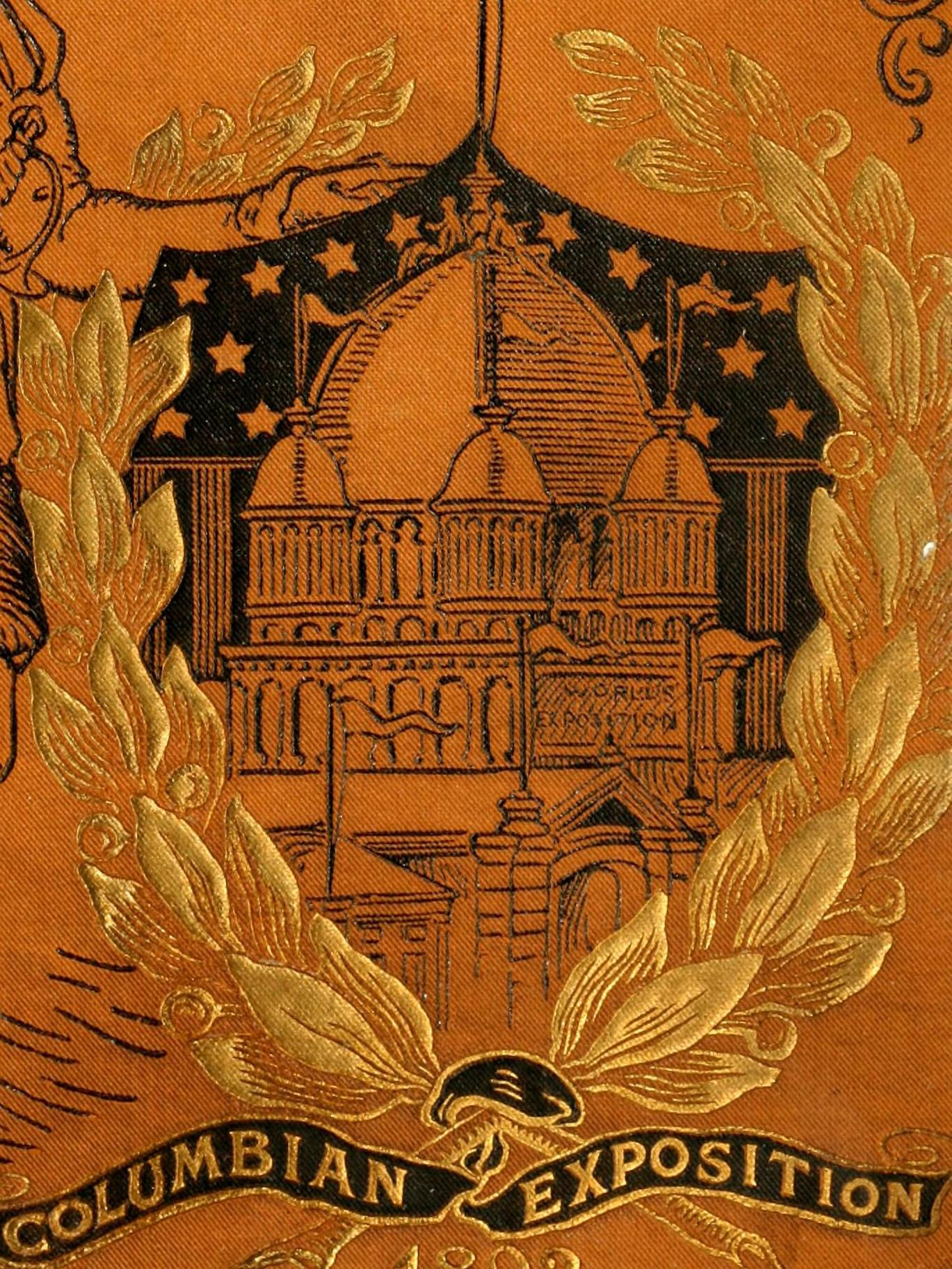
"Columbian Exposition" of 1892 book cover art

The fair ended with the city in shock, as popular mayor Carter Harrison III was assassinated by Patrick Eugene Prendergast two days before the fair's closing. Closing ceremonies were canceled in favor of a public memorial service.

Jackson Park was returned to its status as a public park, in much better shape than its original swampy form. The lagoon was reshaped to give it a more natural appearance, except for the straight-line northern end where it still laps up against the steps on the south side of the Palace of Fine Arts/Museum of Science & Industry building. The Midway Plaisance, a park-like boulevard which extends west from Jackson Park, once formed the southern boundary of the University of Chicago, which was being built as the fair was closing (the university has since developed south of the Midway). The university's football team, the Maroons, were the original "Monsters of the Midway." The exposition is mentioned in the university's alma mater: "The City White hath fled the earth, / But where the azure waters lie, / A nobler city hath its birth, / The City Gray that ne'er shall die."

== Attractions ==
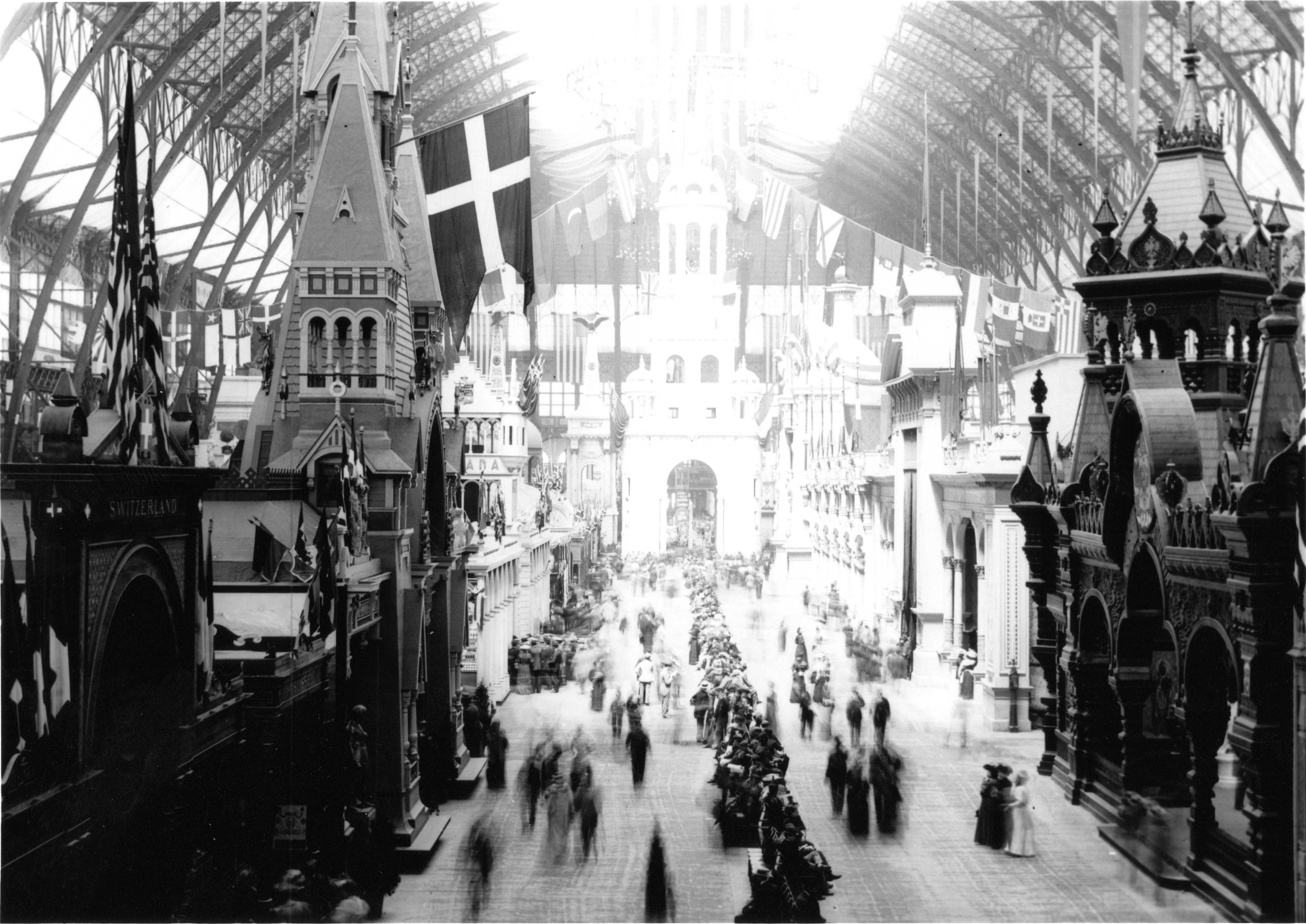
An exhibit hall interior

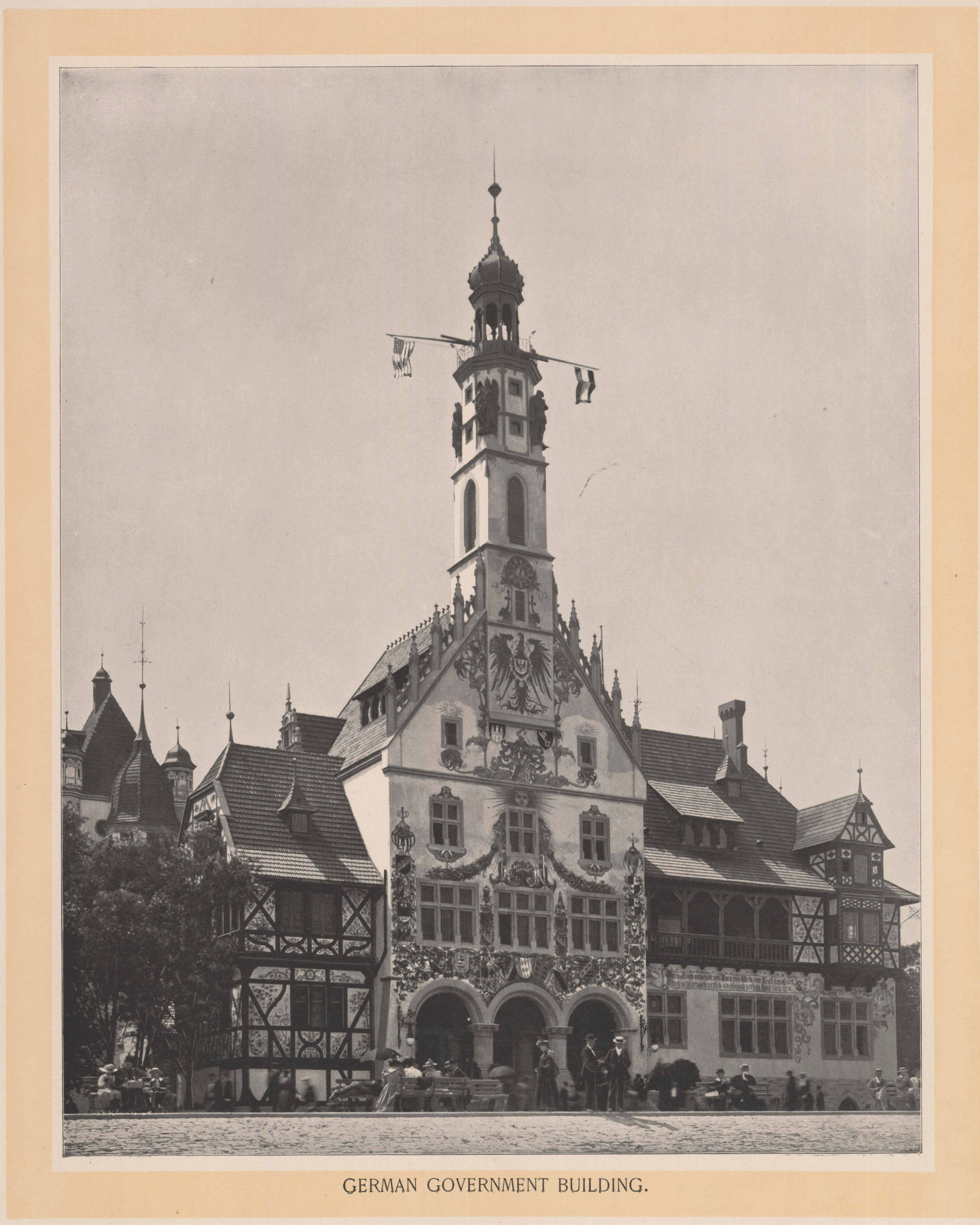
The German pavilion, which remained standing after the Expo

The World's Columbian Exposition was the first world's fair with an area for amusements that was strictly separated from the exhibition halls. This area, developed by a young music promoter, Sol Bloom, concentrated on Midway Plaisance and introduced the term "midway" to American English to describe the area of a carnival or fair where sideshows are located. It included carnival rides, among them the original Ferris Wheel, built by George Washington Gale Ferris Jr. This wheel was 264 feet (80 m) high and had 36 cars, each of which could accommodate 40 people. The importance of the Columbian Exposition is highlighted by the use of rueda de Chicago ("Chicago wheel") in many Latin American countries such as Costa Rica and Chile in reference to the Ferris wheel. One attendee, George C. Tilyou, later credited the sights he saw on the Chicago midway for inspiring him to create America's first major amusement park, Steeplechase Park in Coney Island, New York.

The fair included life-size reproductions of Christopher Columbus' three ships, the Niña (real name Santa Clara), the Pinta, and the Santa María. These were intended to celebrate the 400th anniversary of Columbus' discovery of the Americas. The ships were constructed in Spain and then sailed to America for the exposition. The celebration of Columbus was an intergovernmental project, coordinated by American special envoy William Eleroy Curtis, the Queen Regent of Spain, and Pope Leo XIII. The ships were a very popular exhibit.

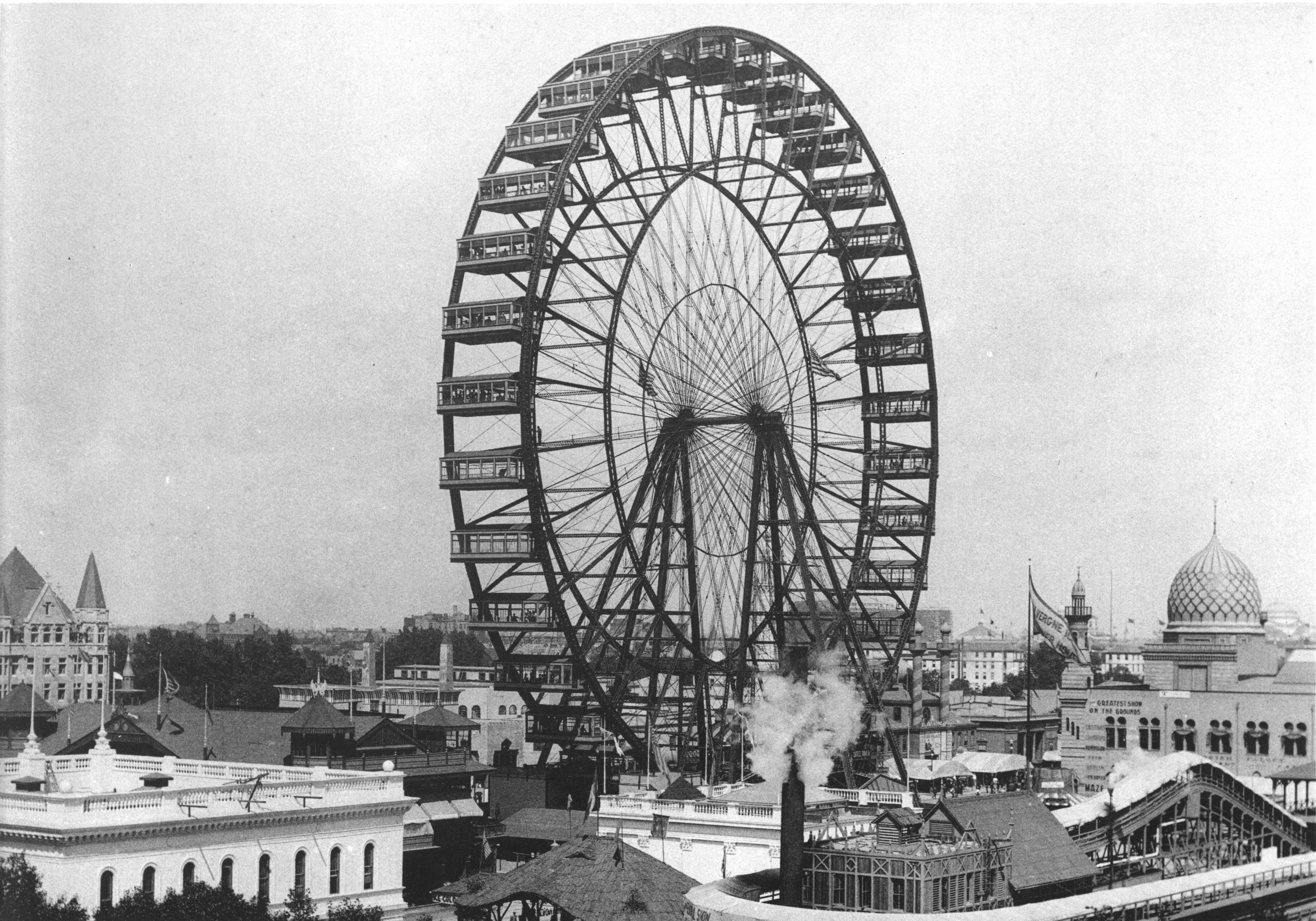
The original Ferris Wheel

Eadweard Muybridge gave a series of lectures on the Science of Animal Locomotion in the Zoopraxographical Hall, built specially for that purpose on Midway Plaisance. He used his zoopraxiscope to show his moving pictures to a paying public. The hall was the first commercial movie theater. Also demonstrated was Ottomar Anschütz's electrotachyscope, which used a Geissler tube to project the illusion of moving images.

The "Street in Cairo" included the popular dancer known as Little Egypt. She introduced America to the suggestive version of the belly dance known as the "hootchy-kootchy", to a tune said to have been improvised by Sol Bloom (and now more commonly associated with snake charmers) which he had composed when his dancers had no music to dance to. Bloom did not copyright the song, putting it immediately in the public domain. This led to Bloom becoming one of the earliest people in U.S. history to make large sums of money from shows which were reminiscent of stripteases.

Although denied a spot at the fair, Buffalo Bill Cody decided to come to Chicago anyway, setting up his Buffalo Bill's Wild West Show just outside the edge of the exposition. Nearby, historian Frederick Jackson Turner gave academic lectures reflecting on the end of the frontier which Buffalo Bill represented.

Louis Comfort Tiffany made his reputation with a stunning chapel designed and built for the Exposition. After the Exposition the Tiffany Chapel was sold several times, even going back to Tiffany's estate. It was eventually reconstructed and restored and in 1999 it was installed at the Charles Hosmer Morse Museum of American Art.

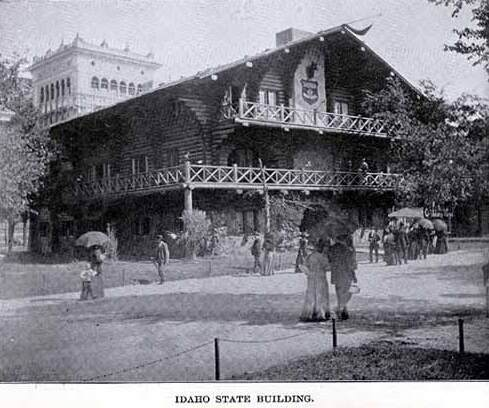
Idaho Building

Architect Kirtland Cutter's Idaho Building, a rustic log construction, was a popular favorite, visited by an estimated 18 million people. The building's design and interior furnishings were a major precursor of the Arts and Crafts movement.

=== Anthropology ===
There was an Anthropology Building at the World's Fair. Nearby, "The Cliff Dwellers" featured a rock and timber structure that was painted to recreate Battle Rock Mountain in Colorado, a stylized recreation of an American Indian cliff dwelling with pottery, weapons, and other relics on display. There was also an Eskimo display. There were also birch bark wigwams of the Penobscot tribe. Nearby was a working model American Indian boarding school, organized by the Office of Indian Affairs, that housed delegations of Native American students and their teachers from schools around the country for weeks at a time. Indigenous children were told to perform civilized skills while being watched by onlookers, demonstrating the cultural assimilation of Native Americans.

=== Rail ===
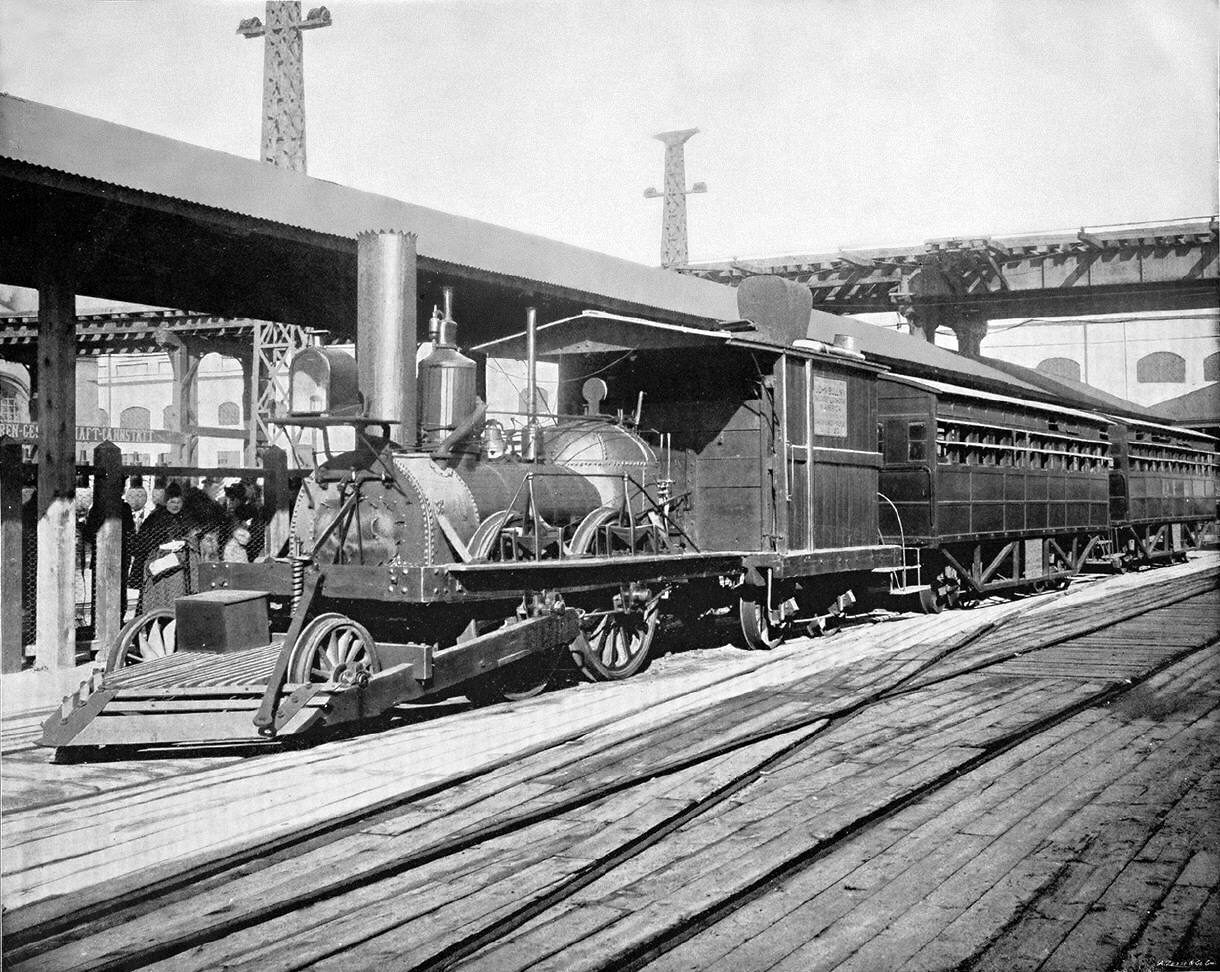
John Bull on display at the exposition.

The John Bull locomotive was displayed. It was only 62 years old, having been built in 1831. It was the first locomotive acquisition by the Smithsonian Institution. The locomotive ran under its own power from Washington, DC, to Chicago to participate, and returned to Washington under its own power again when the exposition closed. In 1981 it was the oldest surviving operable steam locomotive in the world when it ran under its own power again.

A Baldwin 2-4-2 locomotive was showcased at the exposition, and subsequently the 2-4-2 type was known as the Columbia.

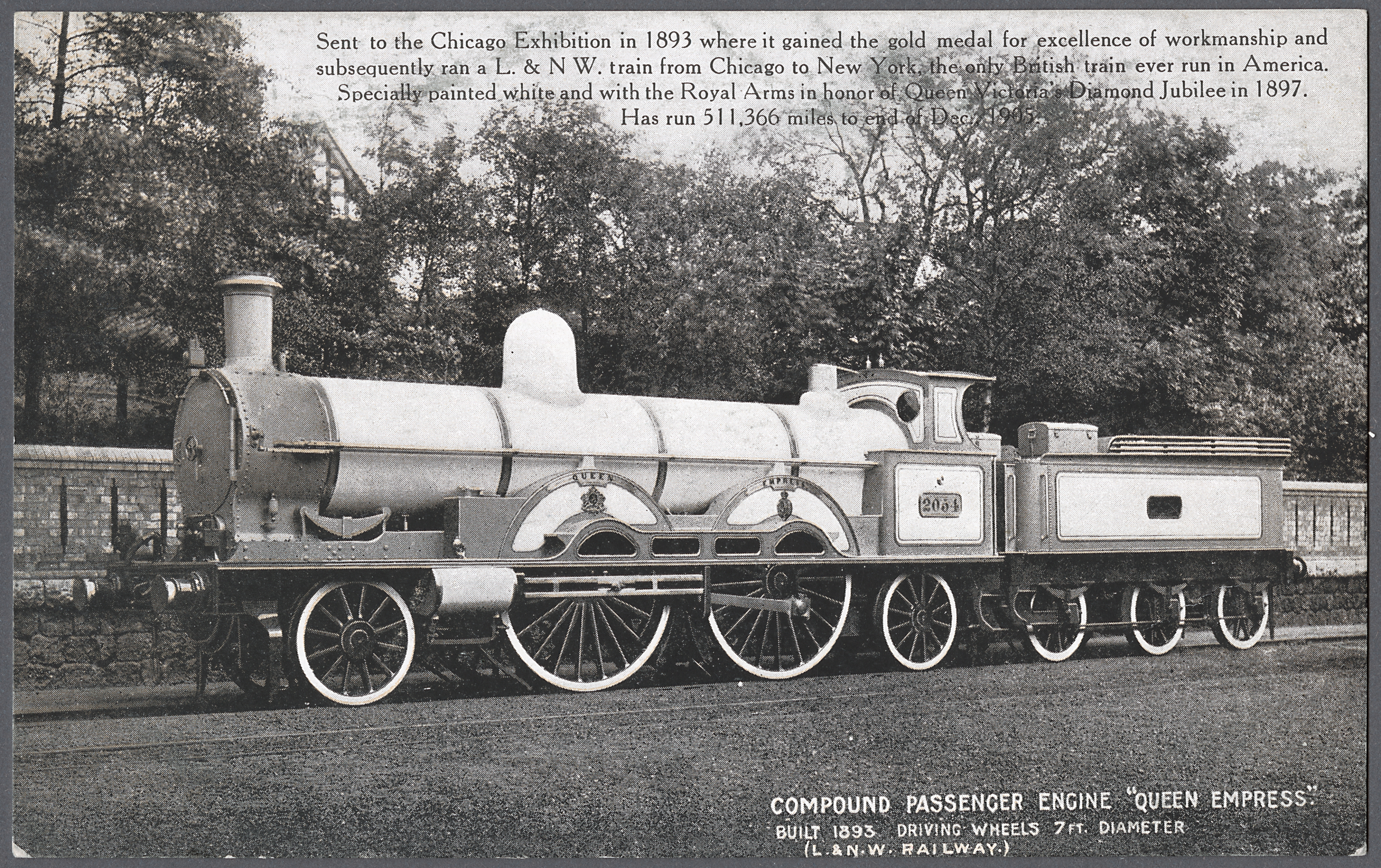
Postcard commemorating the visit by LNWR engine No.2054 Queen Empress', issued in 1897

A British 2-2-2-2 locomotive, London and North Western Railway No.2054 'Queen Empress' was exhibited and later hauled a train to New York.

An original frog switch and portion of the superstructure of the famous 1826 Granite Railway in Massachusetts could be viewed. This was the first commercial railroad in the United States to evolve into a common carrier without an intervening closure. The railway brought granite stones from a rock quarry in Quincy, Massachusetts, so that the Bunker Hill Monument could be erected in Boston. The frog switch is now on public view in East Milton Square, Massachusetts, on the original right-of-way of the Granite Railway.

Rail was the major mode of transportation. A 26-track train station was built at the southwest corner of the fair. While trains from around the country would unload there, there was a local train to shuttle tourists from the Chicago Grand Central Station to the fair. The newly built Chicago and South Side Rapid Transit Railroad also served passengers from Congress Terminal to the fairgrounds at Jackson Park. The line exists today as part of the CTA Green Line.

=== Country and state exhibition buildings ===
Forty-six countries had pavilions at the exposition. Norway participated by sending the Viking, a replica of the Gokstad ship. It was built in Norway and sailed across the Atlantic Ocean by 12 men, led by Captain Magnus Andersen. In 1919, this ship was moved to Lincoln Park. It was relocated in 1996 to Good Templar Park in Geneva, Illinois, where it awaits renovation.

Thirty-four U.S. states also had their own pavilions. The work of noted feminist author Kate McPhelim Cleary was featured during the opening of the Nebraska Day ceremonies at the fair, which included a reading of her poem "Nebraska". Among the state buildings present at the fair were California, Colorado, Connecticut, Florida, Massachusetts, New Jersey, New York, Pennsylvania, and Texas; each was meant to be architecturally representative of the corresponding states.

Four United States territories also had pavilions located in one building: Arizona, New Mexico, Oklahoma, and Utah.

Visitors to the Louisiana Pavilion were each given a seedling of a cypress tree. This resulted in the spread of cypress trees to areas where they were not native. Cypress trees from those seedlings can be found in many areas of West Virginia, where they flourish in the climate.

The Illinois was a detailed, full-scale mockup of an Indiana-class battleship, constructed as a naval exhibit.

=== Guns and artillery ===
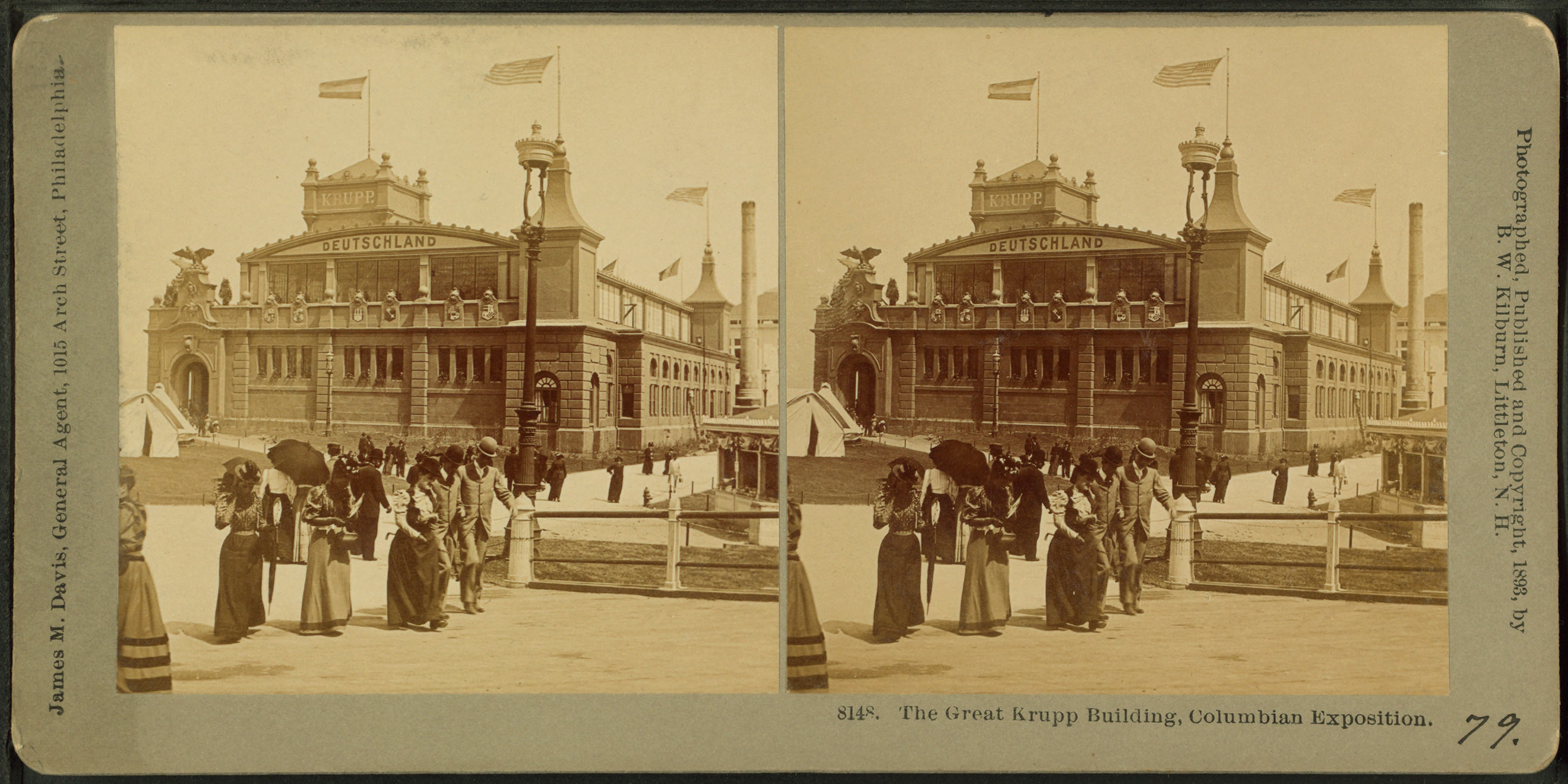
Stereoscopic image of the Great Krupp Building

The German firm Krupp had a pavilion of artillery, which apparently had cost one million dollars to stage, including a coastal gun of 42 cm in bore (16.54 inches) and a length of 33 calibres (45.93 feet, 14 meters). A breech-loaded gun, it weighed 120.46 long tons (122.4 metric tons). According to the company's marketing: "It carried a charge projectile weighing from 2,200 to 2,500 pounds which, when driven by 900 pounds of brown powder, was claimed to be able to penetrate at 2,200 yards a wrought-iron plate three feet thick if placed at right angles."

Nicknamed "The Thunderer", the gun had an advertised range of 15 miles. On this occasion John Schofield declared Krupps' guns "the greatest peacemakers in the world". This gun was later seen as a precursor of the company's World War I Dicke Berta howitzers.

=== Religions ===
The 1893 Parliament of the World's Religions, which ran from September 11 to September 27, marked the first formal gathering of representatives of Eastern and Western spiritual traditions from around the world. According to Eric J. Sharpe, Tomoko Masuzawa, and others, the event was considered radical at the time, since it allowed non-Christian faiths to speak on their own behalf. For example, it is recognized as the first public mention of the Baháʼí Faith in North America; it was not taken seriously by European scholars until the 1960s.

=== Moving walkway ===
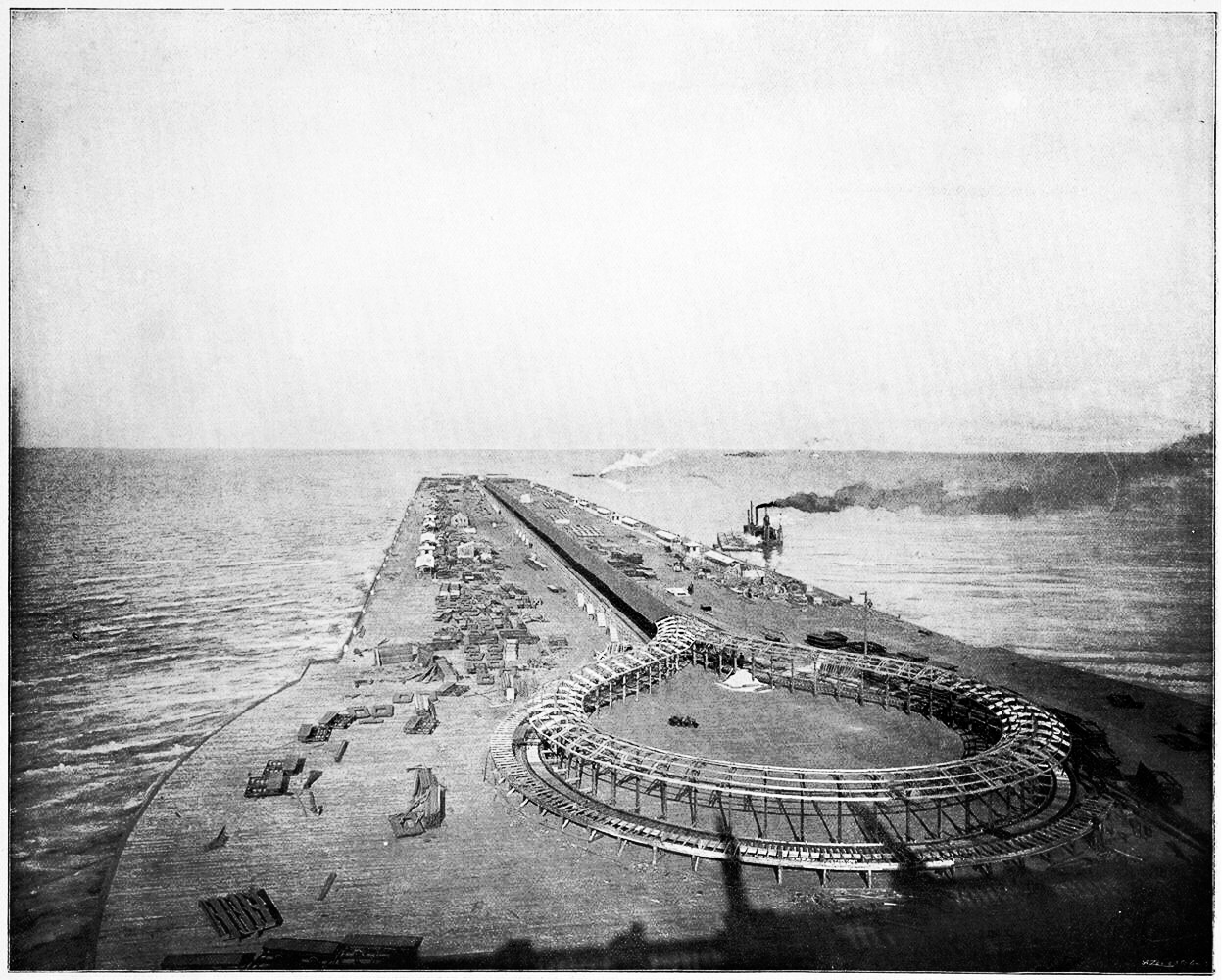
The Great Wharf, Moving Sidewalk

Along the banks of the lake ran a moving walkway designed by architect Joseph Lyman Silsbee, the first of its kind open to the public. Called The Great Wharf, Moving Sidewalk, it carried patrons to the casino and allowed people to walk along or ride in seats.

=== Horticulture ===
Horticultural exhibits at the Horticultural Hall included cacti and orchids as well as other plants in a greenhouse.

== Architecture ==
=== White City ===
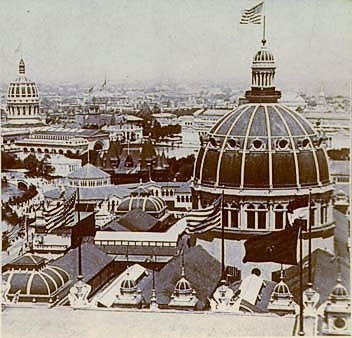
White City

Most of the buildings of the fair were designed in the neoclassical architecture style. The area at the Court of Honor was known as The White City. Façades were made not of stone, but of a mixture of plaster, cement, and jute fiber called staff, which was painted white, giving the buildings their "gleam". Architecture critics derided the structures as "decorated sheds." The buildings were clad in white stucco, which, in comparison to the tenements of Chicago, seemed illuminated. It was also called the White City because of the extensive use of street lights, which made the boulevards and buildings usable at night.

In 1892, working under extremely tight deadlines to complete construction, director of works Daniel Burnham appointed Francis Davis Millet to replace the fair's official director of color-design, William Pretyman. Pretyman had resigned following a dispute with Burnham. After experimenting, Millet settled on a mix of oil and white lead whitewash that could be applied using compressed air spray painting to the buildings, taking considerably less time than traditional brush painting. Joseph Binks, maintenance supervisor at Chicago's Marshall Field's Wholesale Store, who had been using this method to apply whitewash to the subbasement walls of the store, got the job to paint the Exposition buildings. Claims this was the first use of spray painting may be apocryphal, since journals from that time note this form of painting had already been in use in the railroad industry from the early 1880s.

Many of the buildings included sculptural details and, to meet the Exposition's opening deadline, chief architect Burnham sought the help of Chicago Art Institute instructor Lorado Taft to help complete them. Taft's efforts included employing a group of talented women sculptors from the Institute known as "the White Rabbits" to finish some of the buildings, getting their name from Burnham's comment "Hire anyone, even white rabbits if they'll do the work."

The words "Thine alabaster cities gleam" from the song "America the Beautiful" were inspired by the White City.

==== Role in the City Beautiful movement ====
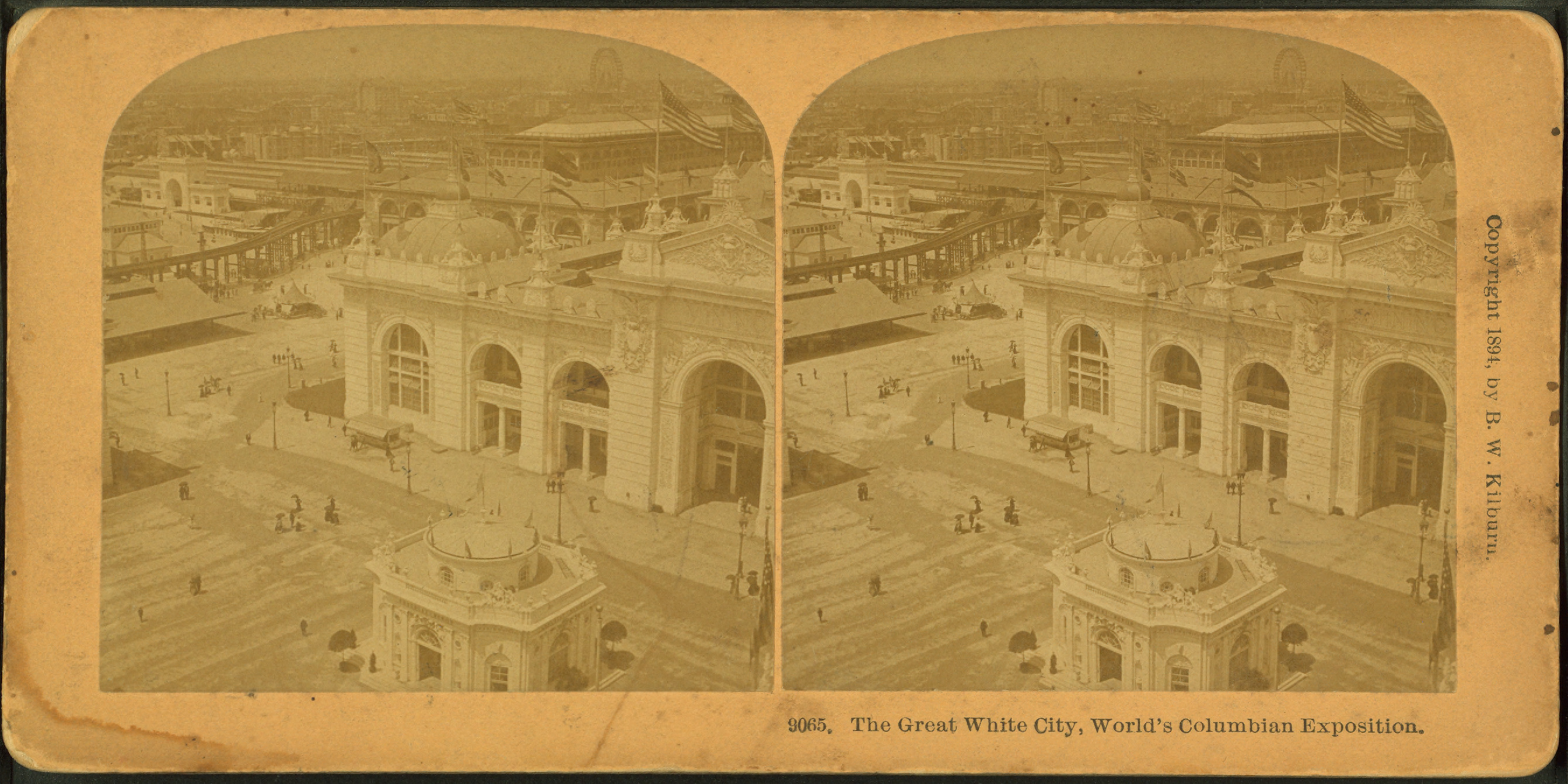
The "Great White City"

The White City is largely credited for ushering in the City Beautiful movement and planting the seeds of modern city planning. The highly integrated design of the landscapes, promenades, and structures provided a vision of what is possible when planners, landscape architects, and architects work together on a comprehensive design scheme.

The White City inspired cities to focus on the beautification of the components of the city in which municipal government had control; streets, municipal art, public buildings, and public spaces. The designs of the City Beautiful Movement (closely tied with the municipal art movement) are identifiable by their classical architecture, plan symmetry, picturesque views, and axial plans, as well as their magnificent scale. Where the municipal art movement focused on beautifying one feature in a city, the City Beautiful movement began to make improvements on the scale of the district. The White City of the World's Columbian Exposition inspired the Merchants Club of Chicago to commission Daniel Burnham to create the Plan of Chicago in 1909.

=== Great buildings ===
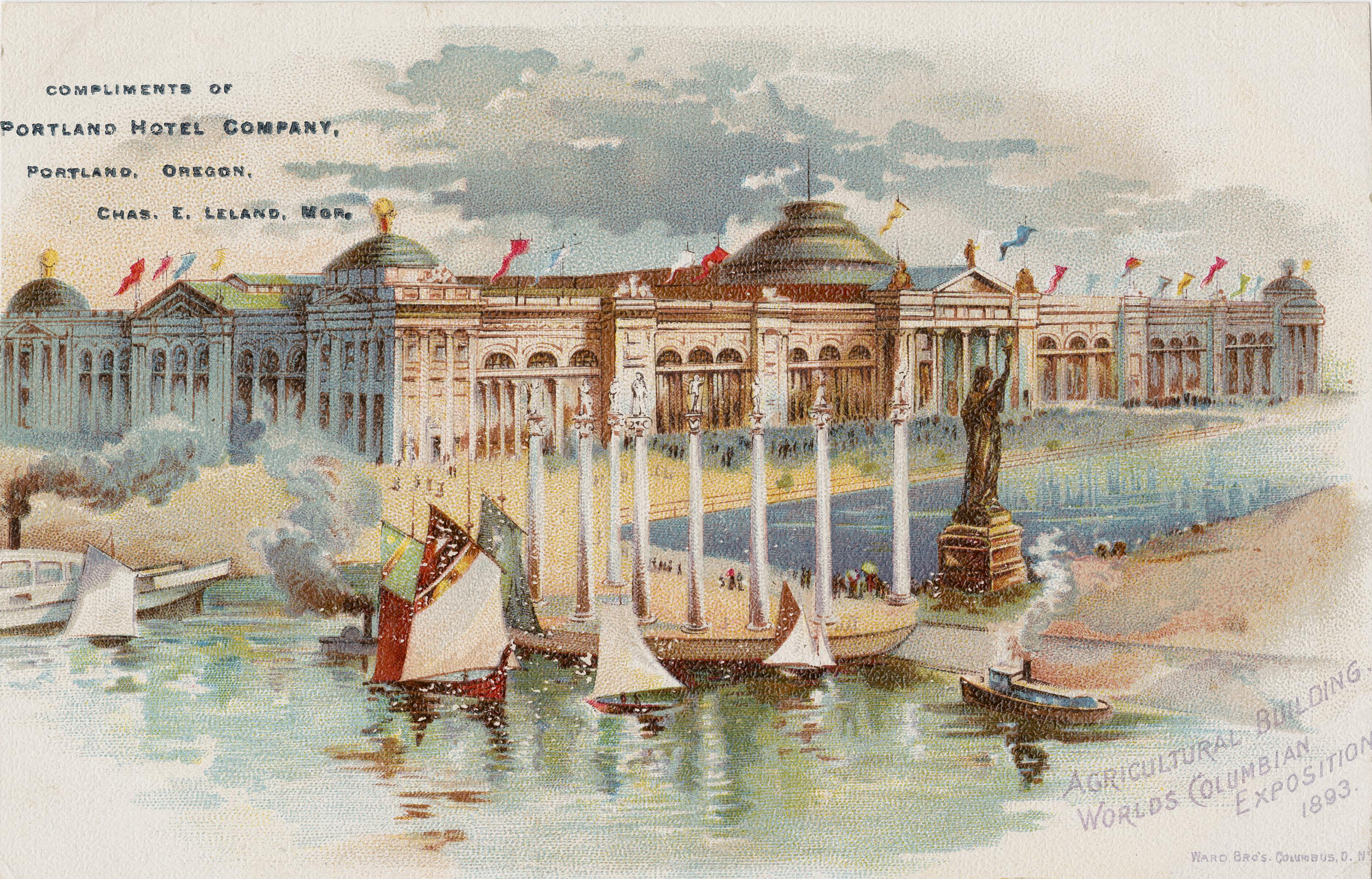
Painting of the Agricultural Building

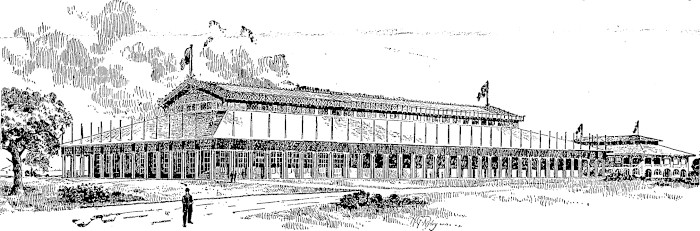
The Forestry Building

There were fourteen main "great buildings" centered around a giant reflective pool called the Grand Basin. Buildings included:

- The Administration Building, designed by Richard Morris Hunt
- The Agricultural Building, designed by Charles McKim of McKim, Mead & White
- The Manufactures and Liberal Arts Building, designed by George B. Post. If this building were standing today, it would rank third in volume (8,500,000m^{3}) and eighth in footprint (130,000 m^{2}) on list of largest buildings. It exhibited works related to literature, science, art and music.
- The Mines and Mining Building, designed by Solon Spencer Beman
- The Electricity Building, designed by Henry Van Brunt and Frank Maynard Howe
- The Machinery Hall, designed by Robert Swain Peabody of Peabody and Stearns
- The Woman's Building, designed by Sophia Hayden
- The Transportation Building, designed by Adler & Sullivan
- The Fisheries Building designed by Henry Ives Cobb
- Forestry Building designed by Charles B. Atwood
- Horticultural Building designed by Jenney and Mundie
- Anthropology Building designed by Charles B. Atwood

=== Transportation Building ===
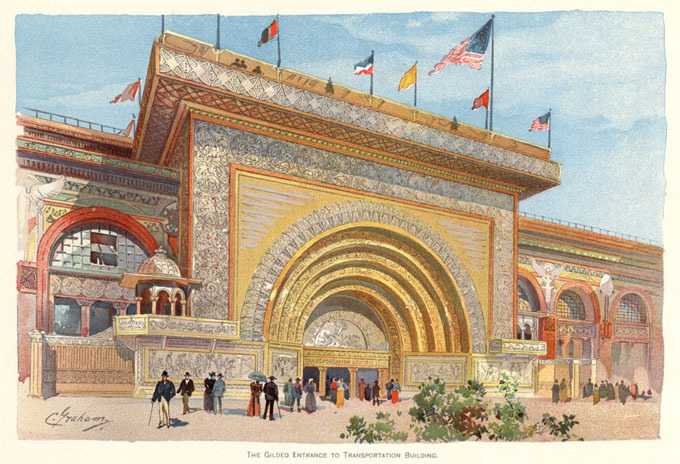
Golden Arch at Louis Sullivan's Transportation Building

Louis Sullivan's polychrome proto-Modern Transportation Building was an outstanding exception to the prevailing style, as he tried to develop an organic American form. Years later, in 1922, he wrote that the classical style of the White City had set back modern American architecture by forty years. During June to December 1893, the building and its exhibits were superintended by US Army Colonel William A. Shunk.

As detailed in Erik Larson's popular history The Devil in the White City, extraordinary effort was required to accomplish the exposition, and much of it was unfinished on opening day. The famous Ferris Wheel, which proved to be a major attendance draw and helped save the fair from bankruptcy, was not finished until June, because of waffling by the board of directors the previous year on whether to build it. Frequent debates and disagreements among the developers of the fair added many delays. The spurning of Buffalo Bill's Wild West Show proved a serious financial mistake. Buffalo Bill set up his highly popular show next door to the fair and brought in a great deal of revenue that he did not have to share with the developers. Nonetheless, construction and operation of the fair proved to be a windfall for Chicago workers during the serious economic recession that was sweeping the country.

=== Surviving structures ===
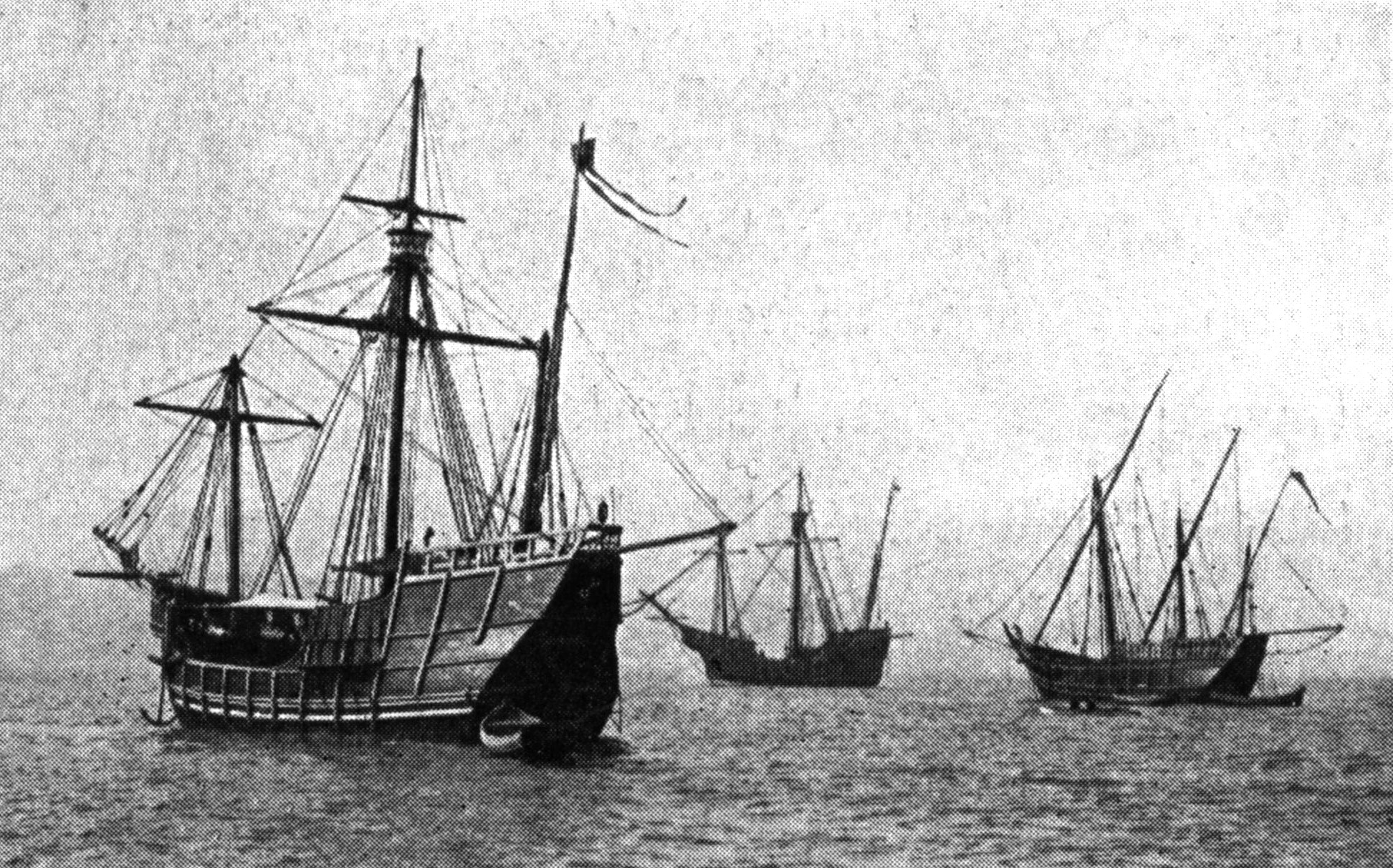
Pinta, Santa María, and Niña replicas from Spain.

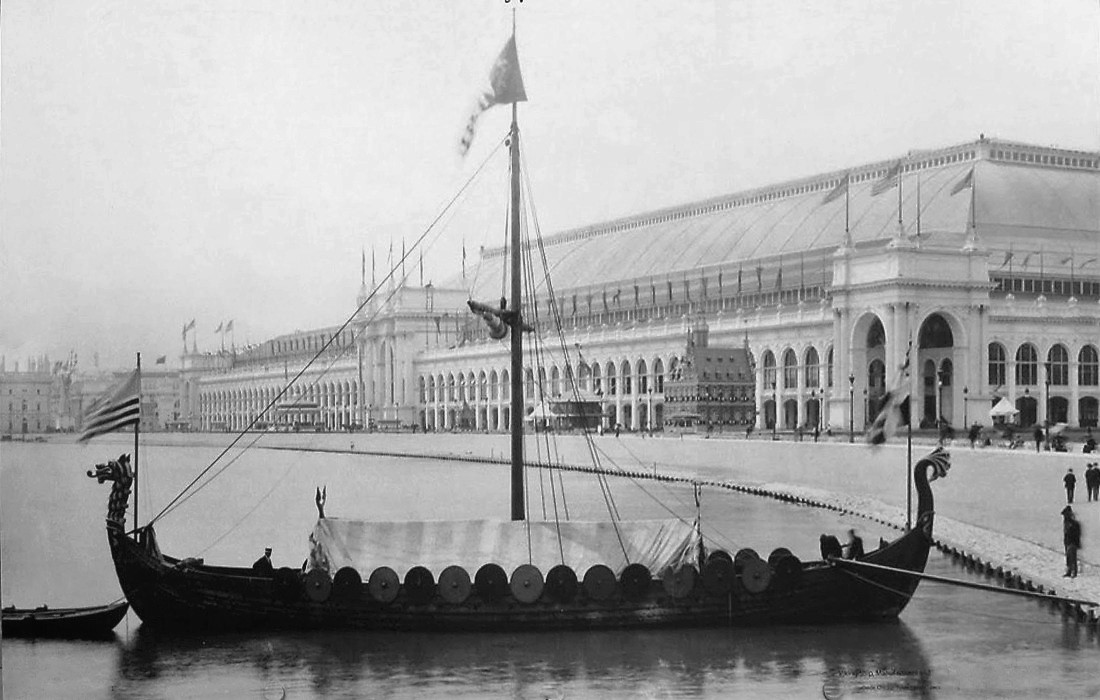
Viking, a replica of the Gokstad ship.

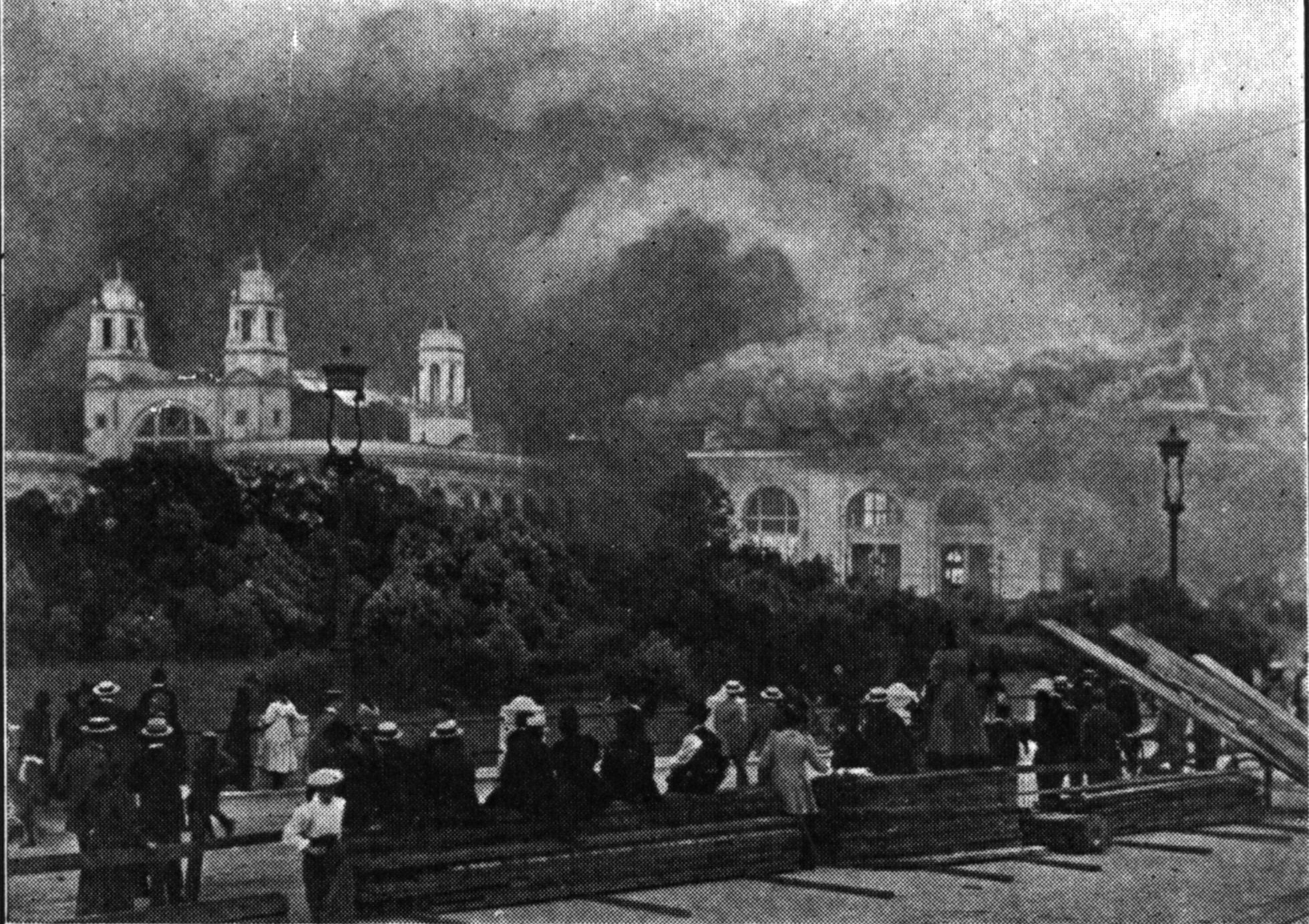
After the fair, the White City on fire.

Almost all of the fair's structures were designed to be temporary; of the more than 200 buildings erected for the fair, the only two which still stand in place are the Palace of Fine Arts and the World's Congress Auxiliary Building. From the time the fair closed until 1920, the Palace of Fine Arts housed the Field Columbian Museum (now the Field Museum of Natural History, since relocated); in 1933 (having been completely rebuilt in permanent materials), the Palace building re-opened as the Museum of Science and Industry. The second building, the World's Congress Building, was one of the few buildings not built in Jackson Park, instead it was built downtown in Grant Park. The cost of construction of the World's Congress Building was shared with the Art Institute of Chicago, which, as planned, moved into the building (the museum's current home) after the close of the fair.

The three other significant buildings that survived the fair represented Norway, the Netherlands, and the State of Maine. The Norway Building was a recreation of a traditional wooden stave church. After the fair it was relocated to Lake Geneva, and in 1935 was moved to a museum called Little Norway in Blue Mounds, Wisconsin. In 2015 it was dismantled and shipped back to Norway, where it was restored and reassembled. The second is the Maine State Building, designed by Charles Sumner Frost, which was purchased by the Ricker family of Poland Spring, Maine. They moved the building to their resort to serve as a library and art gallery. The Poland Spring Preservation Society now owns the building, which was listed on the National Register of Historic Places in 1974. The third is The Dutch House, which was moved to Brookline, Massachusetts.

The 1893 Viking ship that was sailed to the Exposition from Norway by Captain Magnus Andersen is located in Geneva, Illinois. The ship is open to visitors on scheduled days April through October.

The main altar at St. John Cantius in Chicago, as well as its matching two side altars, are reputed to be from the Columbian Exposition.

Since many of the other buildings at the fair were intended to be temporary, they were removed after the fair. The White City so impressed visitors (at least before air pollution began to darken the façades) that plans were considered to refinish the exteriors in marble or some other material. These plans were abandoned in July 1894, when much of the fair grounds was destroyed in a fire.

=== Gallery ===
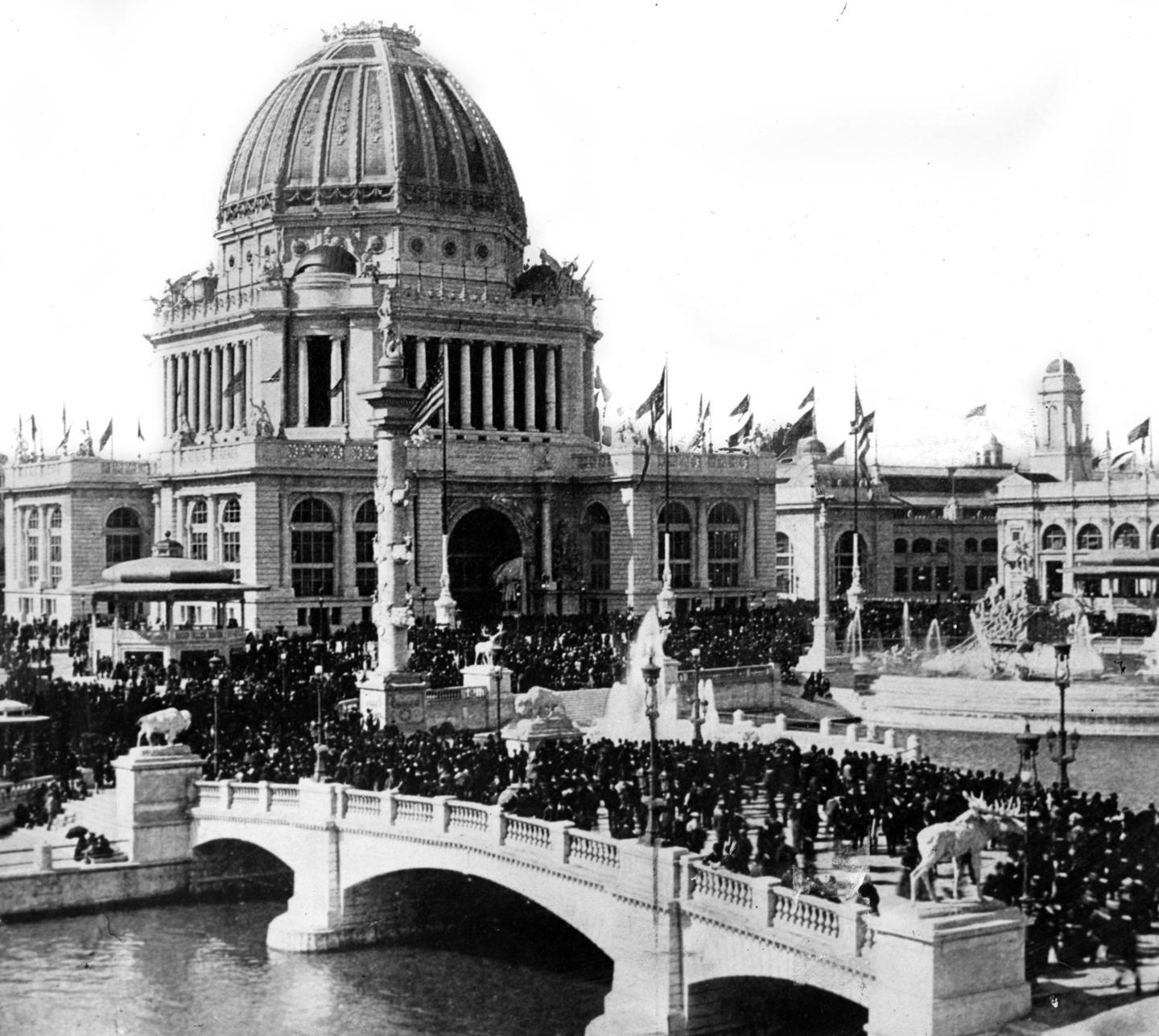
The Administration Building and Grand Court during the October 9, 1893, commemoration of the 22nd anniversary of the Chicago Fire.

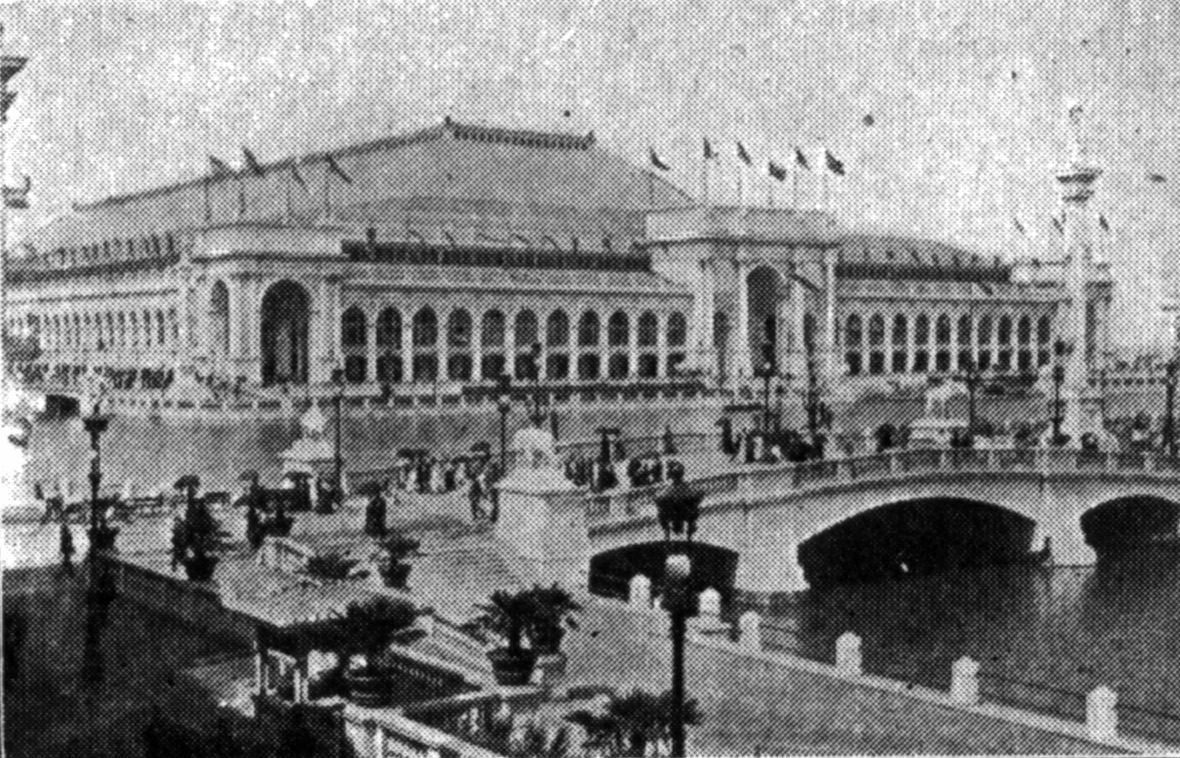
The Manufactures and Liberal Arts Building, seen from the southwest.

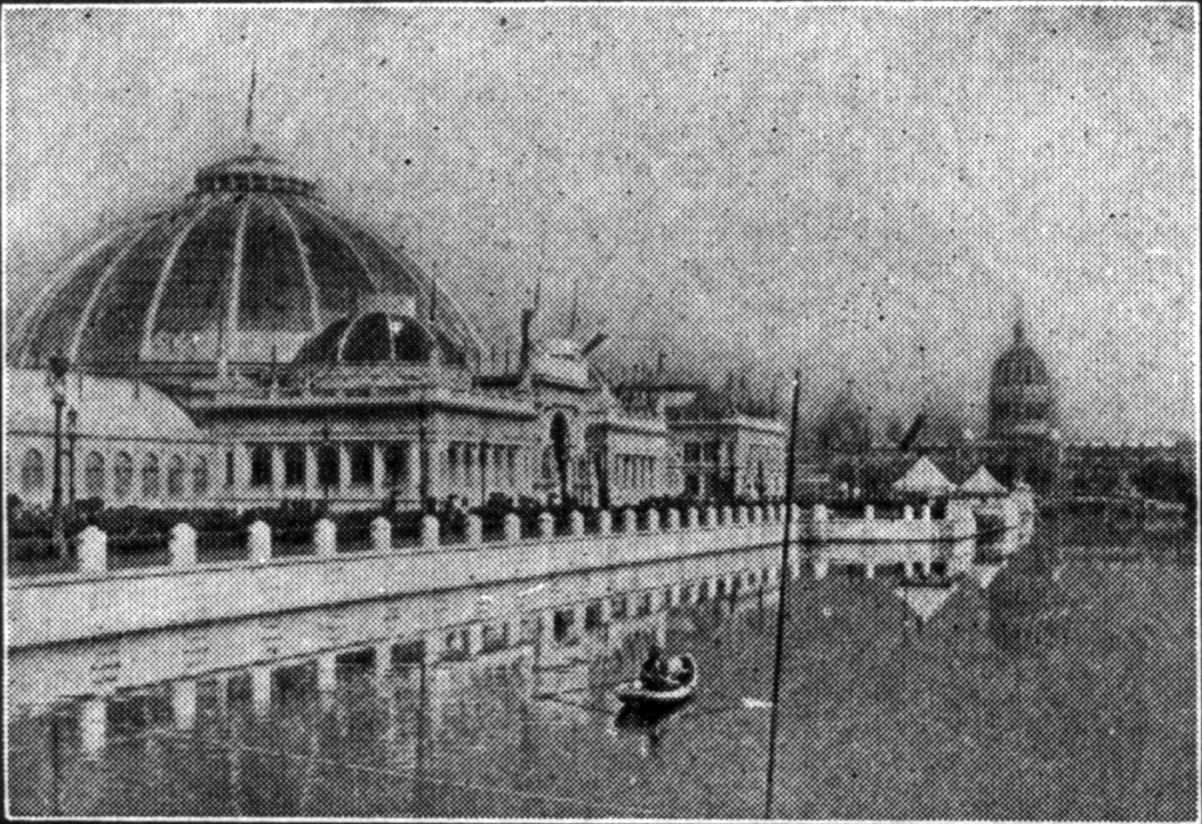
Horticultural Building, with Illinois Building in the background.

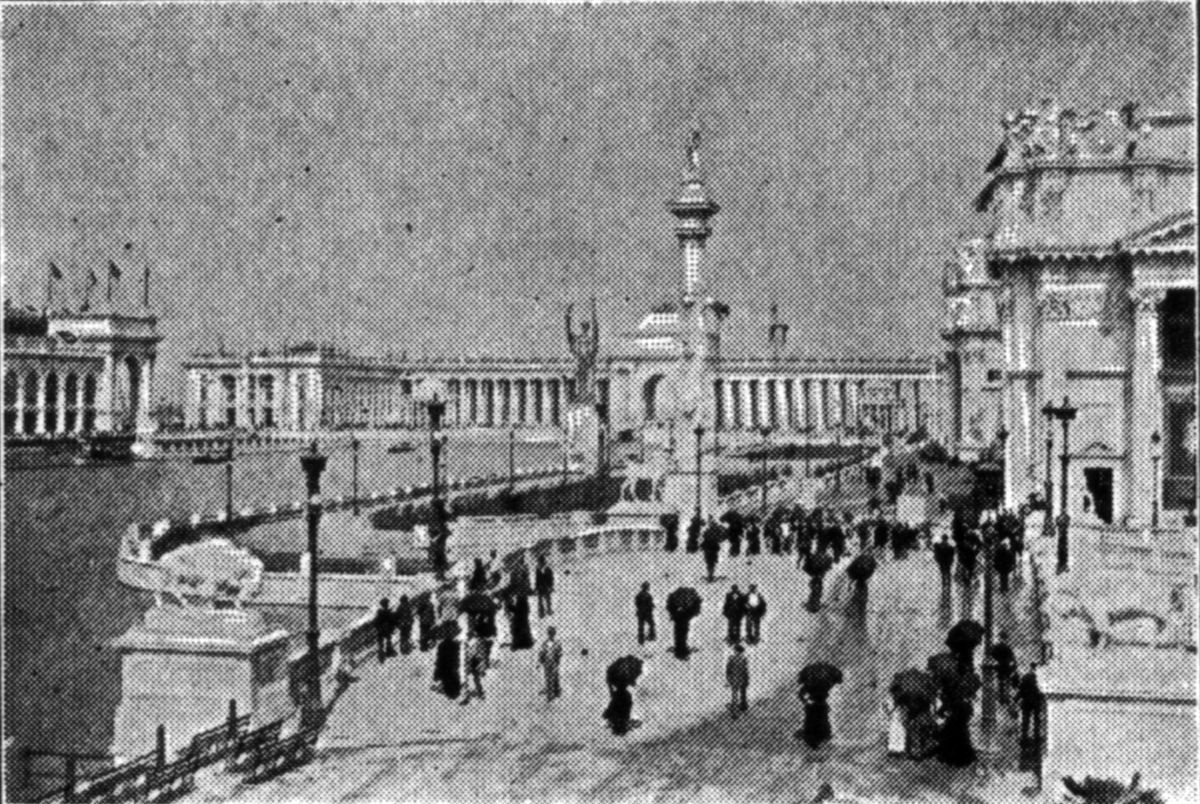
A view toward the Peristyle from Machinery Hall.

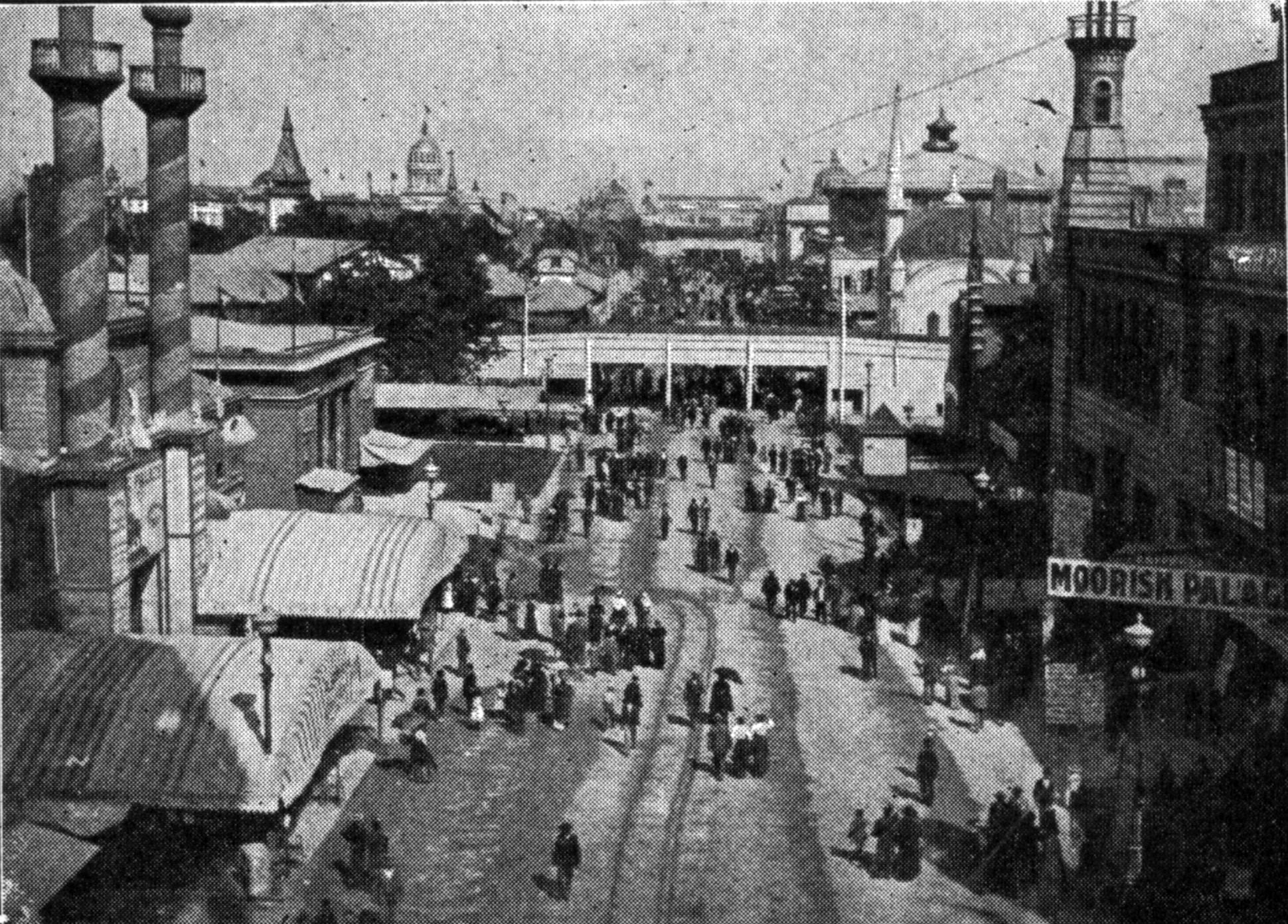
Midway Plaisance

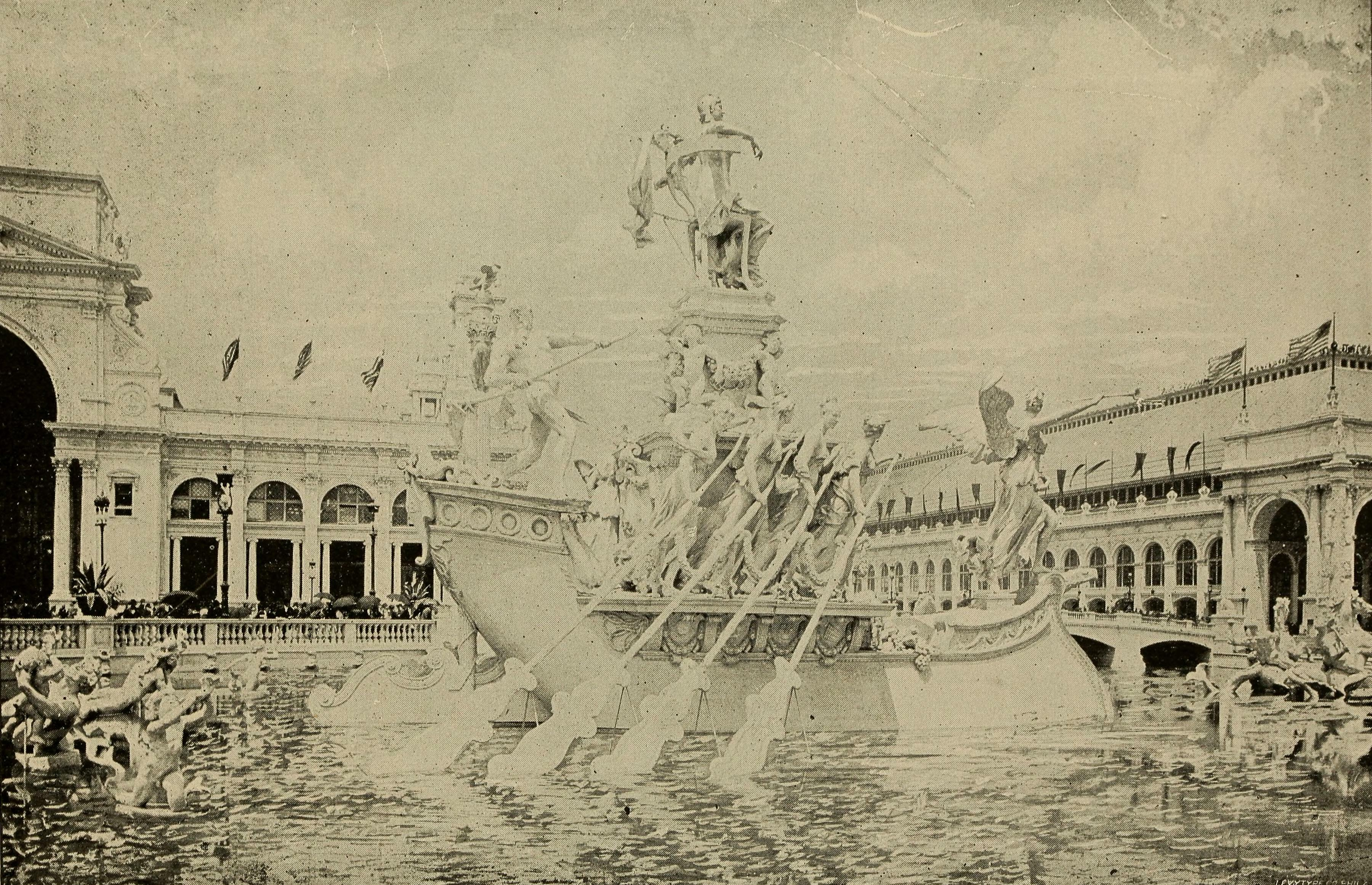
Frederick MacMonnies' Columbian Fountain.

"Canal of Venice" during Chicago World's Fair 1893

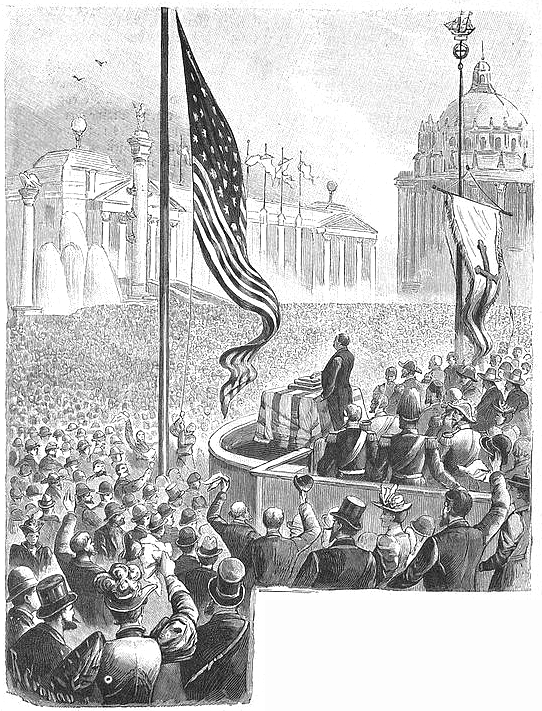
President Cleveland opens the World's Fair, as depicted by Rudolf Cronau in 1893

=== Later criticisms ===
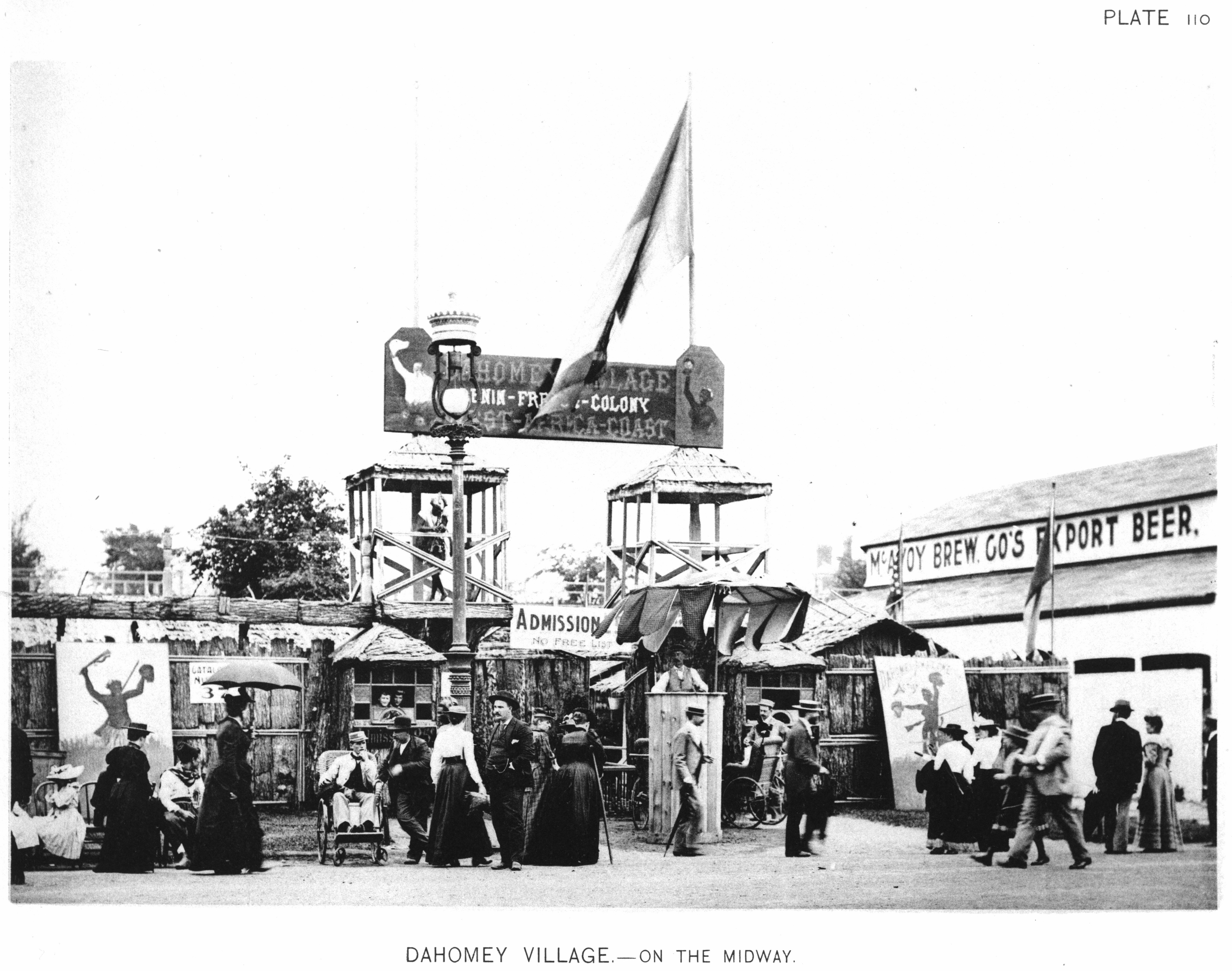
Apart from official nation displays, non-white cultures were largely excluded from the main park and were instead found on the Midway.

Frank Lloyd Wright later wrote that "By this overwhelming rise of grandomania I was confirmed in my fear that a native architecture would be set back at least fifty years."

According to University of Notre Dame history professor Gail Bederman, the event symbolized a male-dominated and Eurocentrist society. In her 1995 text Manliness and Civilization, she writes, "The White City, with its vision of future perfection and of the advanced racial power of manly commerce and technology, constructed civilization as an ideal of white male power".

According to Bederman, people of color were barred entirely from participating in the organization of the White City and were instead given access only to the Midway exhibit, "which specialized in spectacles of barbarous races – 'authentic' villages of Samoans, Egyptians, Dahomans, Turks, and other exotic peoples, populated by actual imported 'natives.'"

Two small exhibits were included in the White City's "Woman's Building" which addressed women of color. One, entitled "Afro-American" was installed in a distant corner of the building. The other, called "Woman's Work in Savagery," included baskets, weavings, and African, Polynesian, and Native American arts. Though they were produced by living women of color, the materials were represented as relics from the distant past, embodying "the work of white women's own distant evolutionary foremothers."

=== Visitors ===
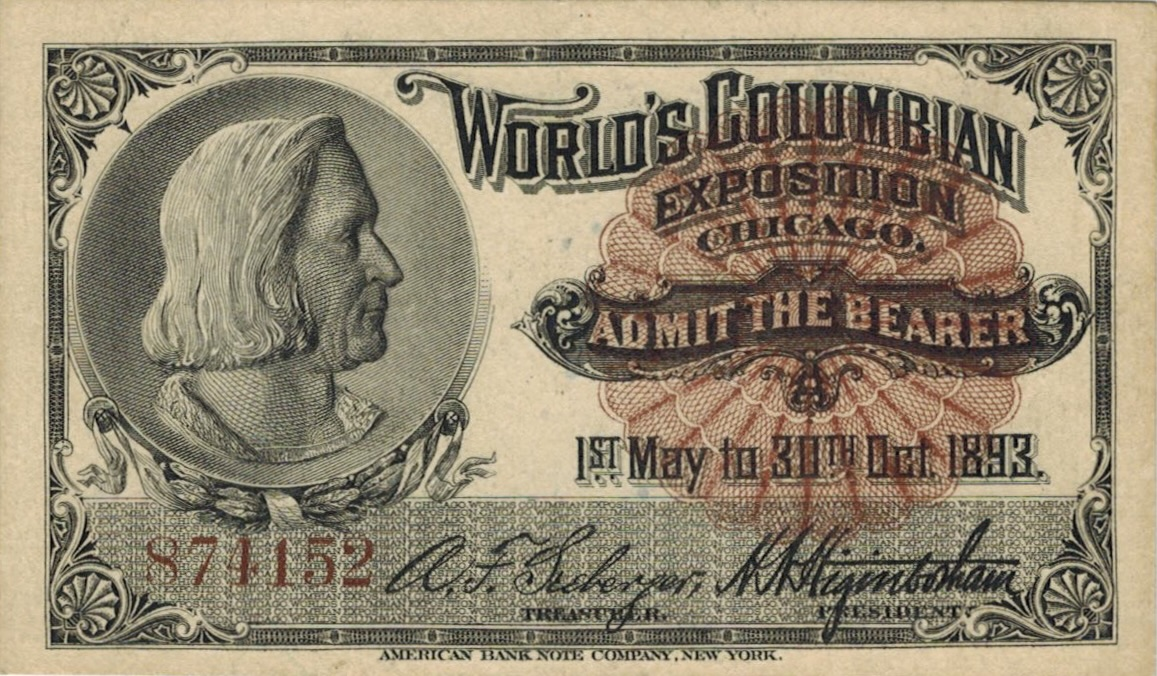
Front of ticket for admission to the World's Columbian Exposition

Helen Keller, along with her mentor Anne Sullivan and Dr. Alexander Graham Bell, visited the fair in summer 1893. Keller described the fair in her autobiography The Story of My Life. Early in July, a Wellesley College English teacher named Katharine Lee Bates visited the fair. The White City later inspired the reference to "alabaster cities" in her poem and lyrics "America the Beautiful". The exposition was extensively reported by Chicago publisher William D. Boyce's reporters and artists. There is a very detailed and vivid description of all facets of this fair by the Persian traveler Mirza Mohammad Ali Mo'in ol-Saltaneh written in Persian. He departed from Persia on April 20, 1892, especially for the purpose of visiting the World's Columbian Exposition.

Pierre de Coubertin visited the fair with his friends Paul Bourget and Samuel Jean de Pozzi. He devotes the first chapter of his book Souvenirs d'Amérique et de Grèce (1897) to the visit. Swami Vivekananda visited the fair to attend the Parliament of the World's Religions and delivered his famous speech Sisters and Brothers of America!. Kubota Beisen was an official delegate of Japan. As an artist, he sketched hundreds of scenes, some of which were later used to make woodblock print books about the Exhibition. Serial killer H. H. Holmes attended the fair with two of his eventual victims, Annie and Minnie Williams. Bulgarian writer Aleko Konstantinov visited the fair and wrote his nonfiction book To Chicago and Back.

Milton S. Hershey visited the fair. Upon seeing German exhibitor J.M. Lehmann's chocolate making machinery, he purchased the machinery which launched The Hershey Company.

== Souvenirs ==
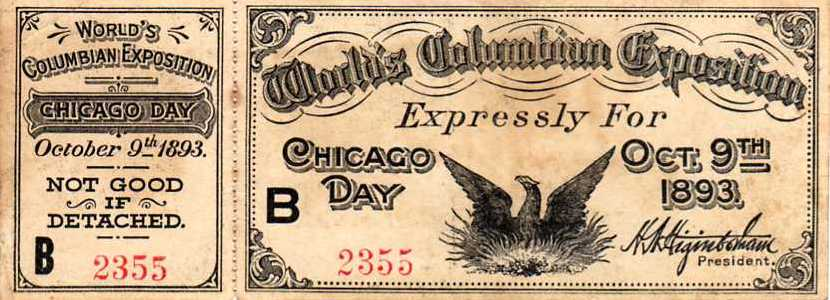
Ticket for Chicago Day

Examples of exposition souvenirs can be found in various American museum collections. One example, copyrighted in 1892 by John W. Green, is a folding hand fan with detailed illustrations of landscapes and architecture. Charles W Goldsmith produced a set of ten postcard designs, each in full colour, showing the buildings constructed for the exhibition. Columbian Exposition coins were also minted for the event.

== Electricity ==
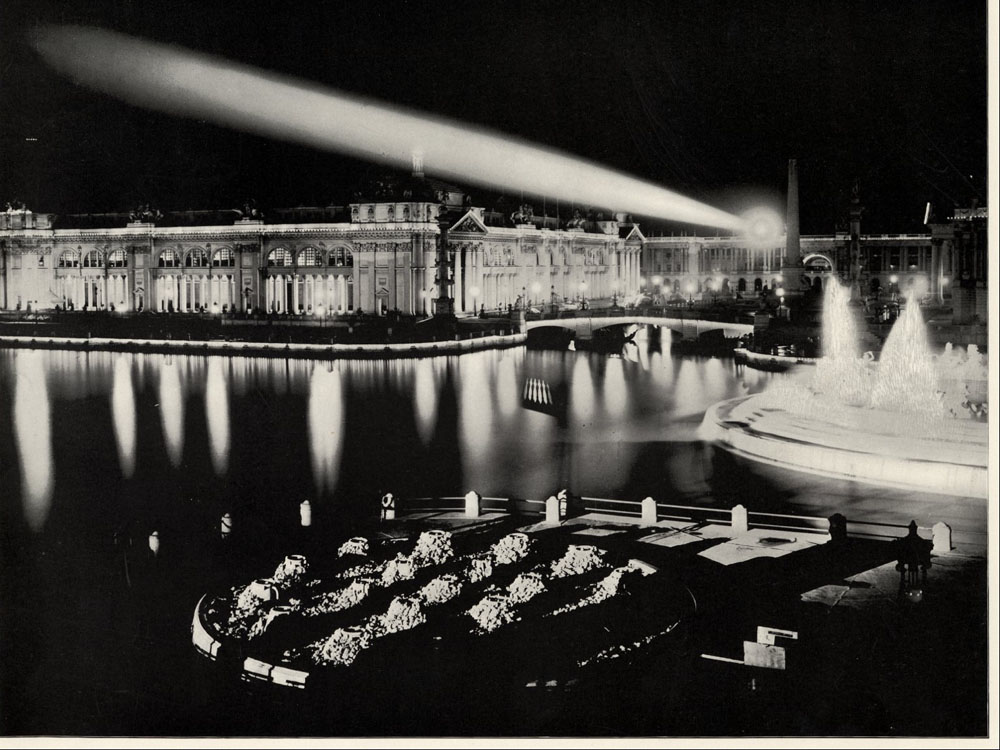
Electricity was used to decorate the buildings with incandescent lights, illuminate fountains, and power three huge spotlights.

The effort to power the fair with electricity, which became a demonstration piece for Westinghouse Electric and the alternating current system they had been developing for many years, took place at the end of what has been called the War of the currents between DC and AC. Westinghouse initially did not put in a bid to power the fair but agreed to be the contractor for a local Chicago company that put in a low bid of US$510,000 to supply an alternating current-based system.

Edison General Electric, which at the time was merging with the Thomson-Houston Electric Company to form General Electric, put in a US$1.72 million bid to power the fair and its planned 93,000 incandescent lamps with direct current. After the fair committee went over both proposals, Edison General Electric re-bid their costs at $554,000 but Westinghouse underbid them by 70 cents per lamp to get the contract. Westinghouse could not use the Edison incandescent lamp since the patent belonged to General Electric and they had successfully sued to stop use of all patent infringing designs. Since Edison specified a sealed globe of glass in his design Westinghouse found a way to sidestep the Edison patent by quickly developing a lamp with a ground-glass stopper in one end, based on a Sawyer-Man "stopper" lamp patent they already had. The lamps worked well but were short-lived, requiring a small army of workmen to constantly replace them.

Westinghouse Electric had severely underbid the contract and struggled to supply all the equipment specified, including twelve 1,000-horsepower single-phase AC generators and all the lighting and other equipment required. They also had to fend off a last-minute lawsuit by General Electric claiming the Westinghouse Sawyer-Man-based stopper lamp infringed on the Edison incandescent lamp patent.

The International Exposition was held in an Electricity Building which was devoted to electrical exhibits. A statue of Benjamin Franklin was displayed at the entrance. The exposition featured interior and exterior light and displays as well as displays of search lights, a seismograph, electric incubators for chicken eggs, and Morse code telegraph.

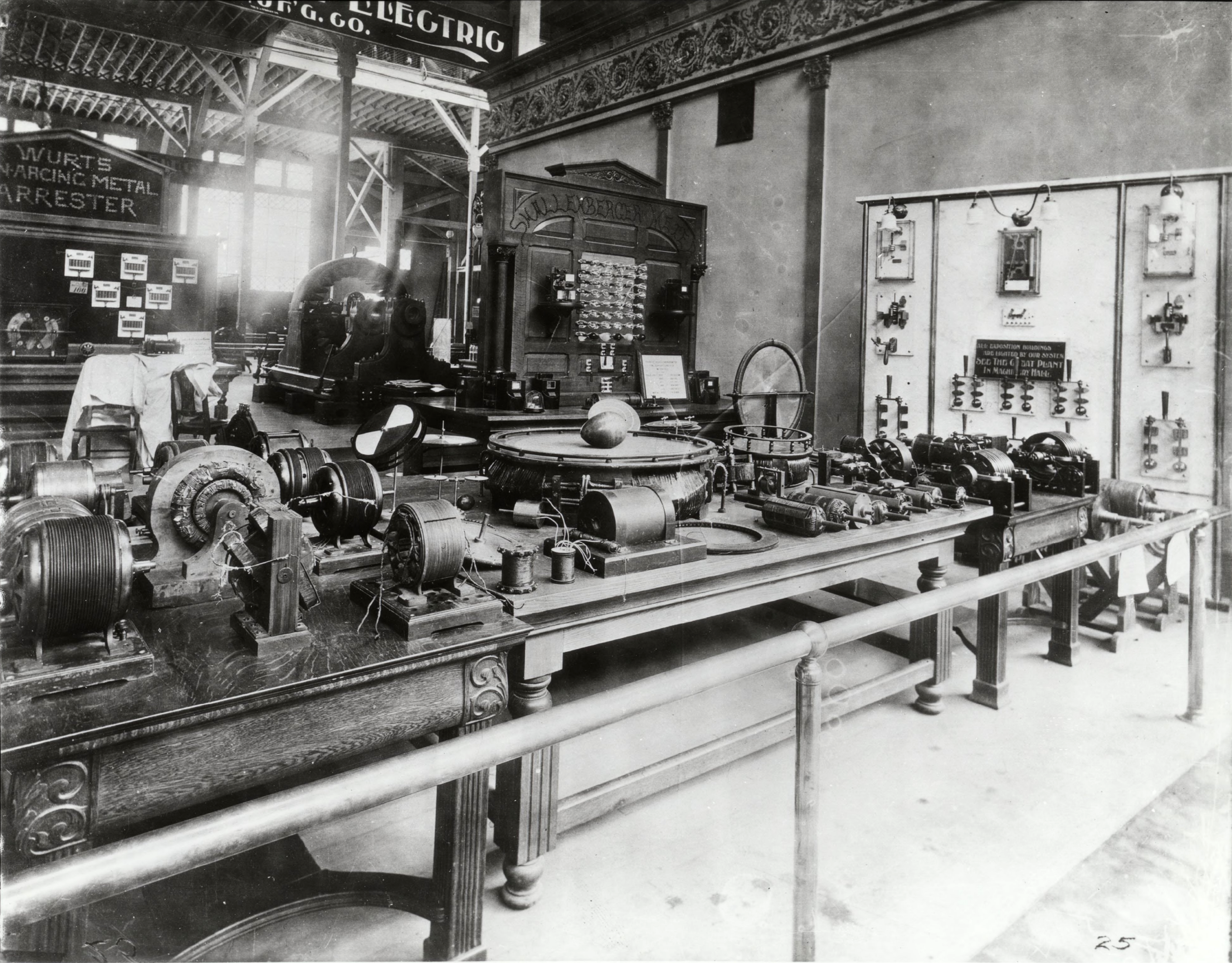
Westinghouses' World's Fair presentation explaining Tesla's AC induction motors and high frequency experiments

All the exhibits were from commercial enterprises. Participants included General Electric, Brush, Western Electric, and Westinghouse. The Westinghouse Company displayed several polyphase systems. The exhibits included a switchboard, polyphase generators, step-up transformers, transmission line, step-down transformers, commercial size induction motors and synchronous motors, and rotary direct current converters (including an operational railway motor). The working scaled system allowed the public a view of a system of polyphase power which could be transmitted over long distances, and be utilized, including the supply of direct current. Meters and other auxiliary devices were also present.

Part of the space occupied by the Westinghouse Company was devoted to demonstrations of electrical devices developed by Nikola Tesla including induction motors and the generators used to power the system. The rotating magnetic field that drove these motors was explained through a series of demonstrations including an Egg of Columbus that used the two-phase coil in the induction motors to spin a copper egg making it stand on end.

Tesla himself showed up for a week in August to attend the International Electrical Congress, being held at the fair's Agriculture Hall, and put on a series of demonstrations of his wireless lighting system in a specially set up darkened room at the Westinghouse exhibit. These included demonstrations he had previously performed throughout America and Europe including using a nearby coil to light a wireless gas-discharge lamp held in his hand.

Also at the fair, the Chicago Athletic Association Football team played one of the first night football games against West Point (the earliest being on September 28, 1892, between Mansfield State Normal and Wyoming Seminary). Chicago won the game, 14–0. The game lasted only 40 minutes, compared to the normal 90 minutes.

== Music ==
=== Musicians ===
Bird's Eye View, 1893

- John Philip Sousa′s Band played for the Exposition dedication celebration in Chicago, 10 October through 21 October 1892.
- Joseph Douglass, classical violinist, who achieved wide recognition after his performance there and became the first African-American violinist to conduct a transcontinental tour and the first to tour as a concert violinist.
- Sissieretta Jones, a soprano known as "the Black Patti" and an already-famous opera singer.
- A paper on African-American spirituals and shouts by Abigail Christensen was read to attendees.

There were many other black artists at the fair, ranging from minstrel and early ragtime groups to more formal classical ensembles to street buskers.

- Scott Joplin, pianist, from Texarkana, Texas; became widely known for his piano playing at the fair.

=== Other music and musicians ===
- The first Indonesian music performance in the United States was at the exposition. The gamelan instruments used in the performance were later placed in the Field Museum of Natural History.
- A group of hula dancers led to increased awareness of Hawaiian music among Americans throughout the country.
- Stoughton Musical Society, the oldest choral society in the United States, presented the first concerts of early American music at the exposition.
- The first eisteddfod (a Welsh choral competition with a history spanning many centuries) held outside Wales was held in Chicago at the exposition.
- A 250-voice Mormon Tabernacle Choir competed in the Eisteddfod, taking the second place prize of $1,000. This was the first appearance of the choir outside the Utah Territory.
- On August 12, 1893, Antonín Dvořák conducted a gala "Bohemian Day" concert at the exposition. The program included works by Smetena, Bendl, and other Czech composers. Dvorak conducted his Symphony No. 8, selections from his Slavonic Dances, and My Home Overture.
- American composer Amy Beach (1867–1944) was commissioned by the Board of Lady Managers of the fair to compose a choral work (Festival Jubilate, op. 17) for the opening of the Woman's Building.
- Sousa's Band played concerts in the south bandstand on the Great Plaza, 25 May to 28 June 1893.
- The University of Illinois Military Band conducted by student leaders Charles Elder and Richard Sharpe played concerts twice daily in the Illinois Building 9 June to 24 June 1893. Soloists were William Sandford, euphonium; Charles Elder, clarinet; William Steele, cornet. The band members slept on cots on the top floor of the building.
- On June 7, 1893, the Chicago Symphony, conducted by Woizech Iwanowich Hlavac, premiered Russian Composer Alexandr Glazunov's Triumphal March,
- On June 8, 1893, The Exposition Orchestra, an expanded version of the Chicago Symphony, conducted by guest conductor Vojtěch I. Hlaváč, played the American premiere of Modest Mussorgsky's A Night on Bald Mountain as part of a concert of Russian folk music.
- A pipe organ containing over 3,900 pipes, one of the largest in the world at the time, was built by the Farrand & Votey Organ Company to the specifications of Chicago organist Clarence Eddy. It was one of the first great organs to rely on electrical connections from its keys to its pipes.
- Musicologist Anna Morsch and composer Charlotte Sporleder presented a program of German music.
- Composer and pianist Anita Socola Specht won the title "best amateur pianist in the United States," although some of the judges told her, "You are not an amateur, you are an artist!"

== Art ==
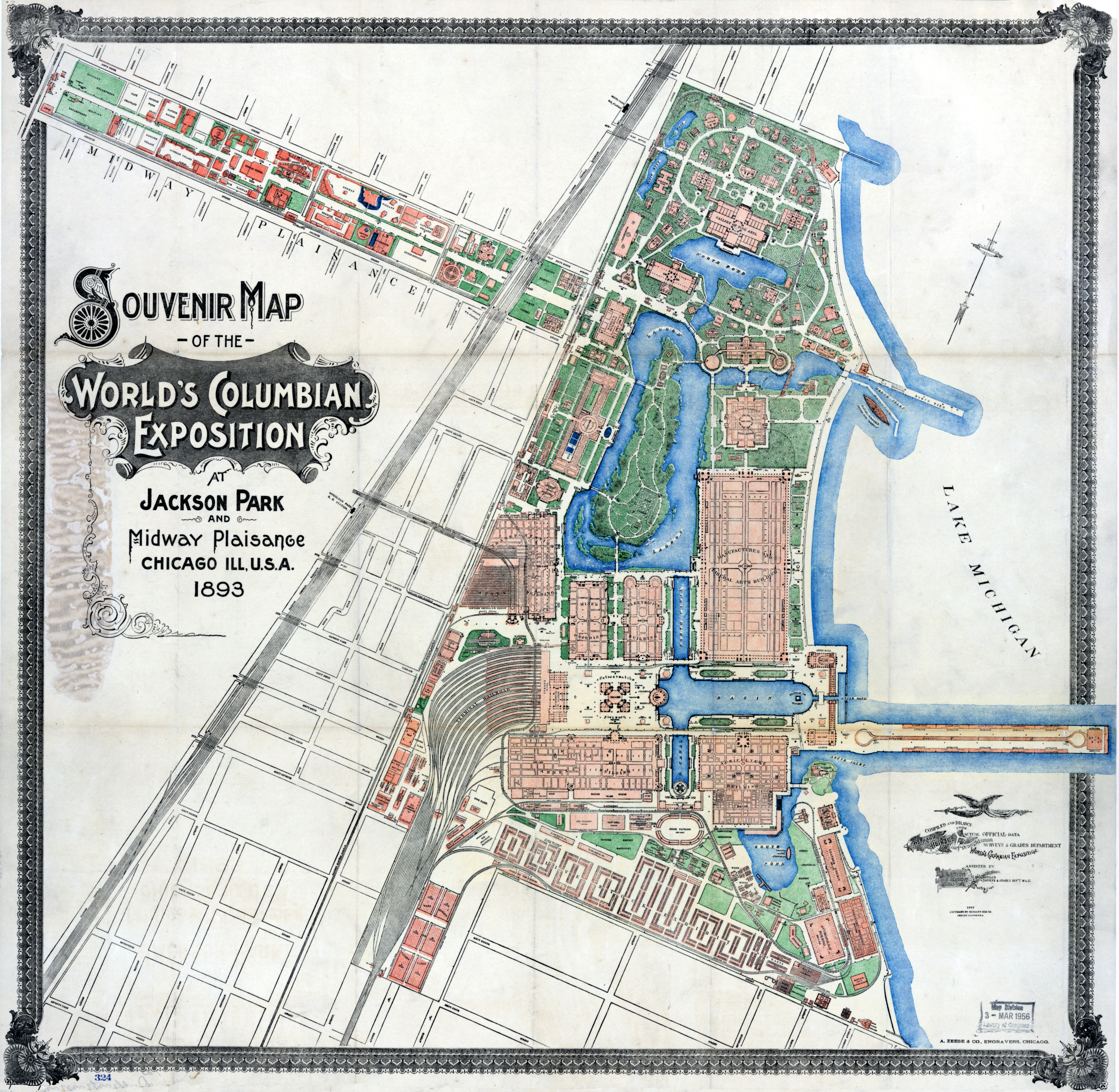
Souvenir Map, 1893, Jackson Park at left hosted the main fair exhibitions, while the Midway, the narrow extension to the left, hosted various amusements

=== American artists exhibiting ===
==== Painters ====
- Adam Emory Albright
- Henry Alexander
- Maitland Armstrong
- William Jacob Baer
- William Bliss Baker
- Cecilia Beaux
- James Carroll Beckwith
- Enella Benedict
- Frank Weston Benson
- Daniel Folger Bigelow
- Ralph Albert Blakelock
- Edwin Howland Blashfield
- Mary Cassatt
- Sarah Paxton Ball Dodson
- Thomas Eakins
- Charles Morgan McIlhenney
- Gari Melchers
- Anna Lea Merritt
- John Harrison Mills
- Robert Crannell Minor
- Louis Moeller
- Harry Humphrey Moore
- Edward Moran
- John Singer Sargent

==== Sculptors ====
- Sarah Fisher Ames, sculptor
- John J. Boyle sculptor
- Cyrus Edwin Dallin, sculptor – Signal of Peace
- Charles Grafly – Bust of Daedalus
- Mary Lawrence, sculptor
- Edward Kemeys
- Theo Alice Ruggles Kitson (as Theo Alice Ruggles)
- Aloys Loeher
- Carol Brooks MacNeil (as Caroline Brooks)
- Helen Farnsworth Mears
- Samuel Murray – Bust of Walt Whitman
- William Rudolf O'Donovan – Bust of Thomas Eakins
- Bessie Potter
- Peter Moran
- George D. Peterson
- Preston Powers
- Katherine Prescott
- A. Phimister Proctor
- John Rogers
- Carl Rohl-Smith
- Lorado Taft
- Douglas Tilden
- Luella Varney

=== Japanese art ===
Japan's artistic contribution was mainly in porcelain, cloisonné enamel, metalwork and embroidery. While 55 paintings and 24 sculptures came from Japan, 271 of the 290 exhibits in the Palace of Fine Arts were Japanese. Artists represented included Miyagawa Kozan, Yabu Meizan, Namikawa Sōsuke, and Suzuki Chokichi.

=== Women artists exhibiting ===
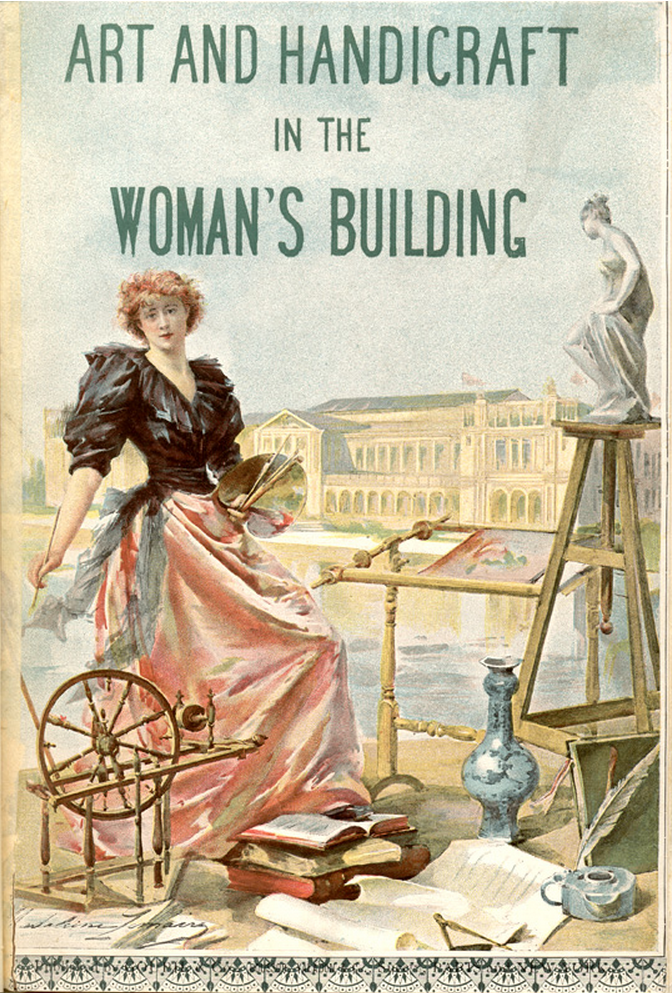
Woman's Building Lemaire poster

The women artists at the Woman's Building included Anna Lownes, Viennese painter Rosa Schweninger, and many others. American composer Amy Cheney Beach was commissioned by the Board of Lady Managers of the fair to compose a choral work (Festival Jubilate, op. 17) for the opening of the Woman's Building. The Mrs Potts sad-iron system was on display. Ami Mali Hicks' stencil design was selected to adorn the frieze in the assembly room of the Women's Building. Musicologist Anna Morsch and composer Charlotte Sporleder presented a program of German music.

The Woman's Building included a Woman's Building Library Exhibit, which had 7,000 books – all by women. The Woman's Building Library was meant to show the cumulative contribution of the world's women to literature.

== "Greatest Refrigerator on Earth" fire tragedy ==
A large Romanesque structure called "Greatest Refrigerator on Earth" stored thousands of pounds of the Exposition's food and held an ice-skating rink for patrons. The large structure demonstrated artificial freezing, a recent development, and was planned by architect Franklin P. Burnham. The structure's floor space was 130 by 255 feet (40 by 78 m) and its height reached almost 200 feet (61 m). On the evening of July 10, 1893, the "Greatest Refrigerator on Earth" caught fire. Two firemen entered, one sliding down a rope and another on a line of hose, and both were trapped in the burning refrigerator. A total of fifteen people died, twelve firefighters and three civilians, in front of a crowd of more than a thousand fairgoers. The only artifact that survived the fire was a twelve-foot copper statue of Christopher Columbus, which was kept as a monument to the men who lost their lives and is kept by the fire museum of Chicago.

== Notable firsts ==
=== Concepts ===
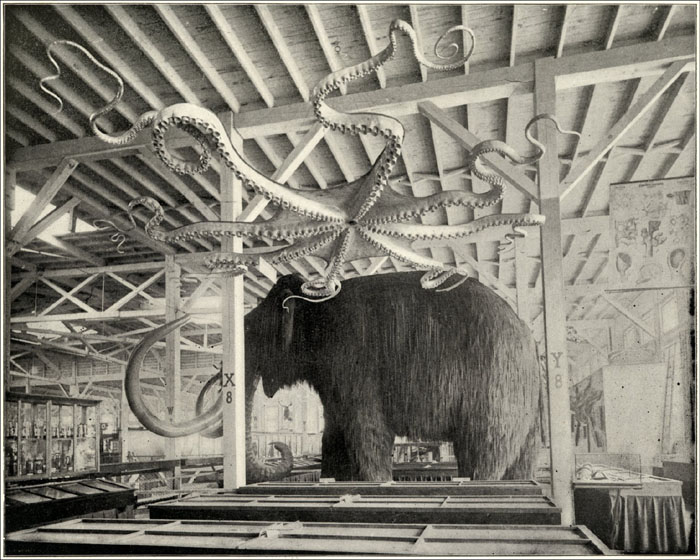
Mammoth and Giant Octopus, display at the Columbian World's Fair, 1893

- Frederick Jackson Turner lectured on his Frontier Thesis.
- The Pledge of Allegiance was first performed at the exposition by a mass of school children lined up in military fashion.
- Contribution to Chicago's nickname, the "Windy City". Some argue that Charles Anderson Dana of the New York Sun coined the term related to the hype of the city's promoters. Other evidence, however, suggests the term was used as early as 1881 in relation to either Chicago's "windbag" politicians or to its weather.

=== Commemorations ===
- United States Mint offered its first commemorative coins: the Columbian Exposition quarter dollar and Columbian Exposition half dollar
- The United States Post Office Department produced its first picture postcards and Columbian Issue commemorative stamps.

=== Edibles and potables ===
- Juicy Fruit gum
- Quaker Oats
- Shredded Wheat
- Pabst Blue Ribbon
- Vienna Sausage started selling its frankfurters and sausages near one of the entrances to the Midway Plaisance, just outside the Old Vienna Village. The company later became known as Vienna Beef, famously recognized as "Chicago's Hot Dog".

=== Inventions and manufacturing advances ===
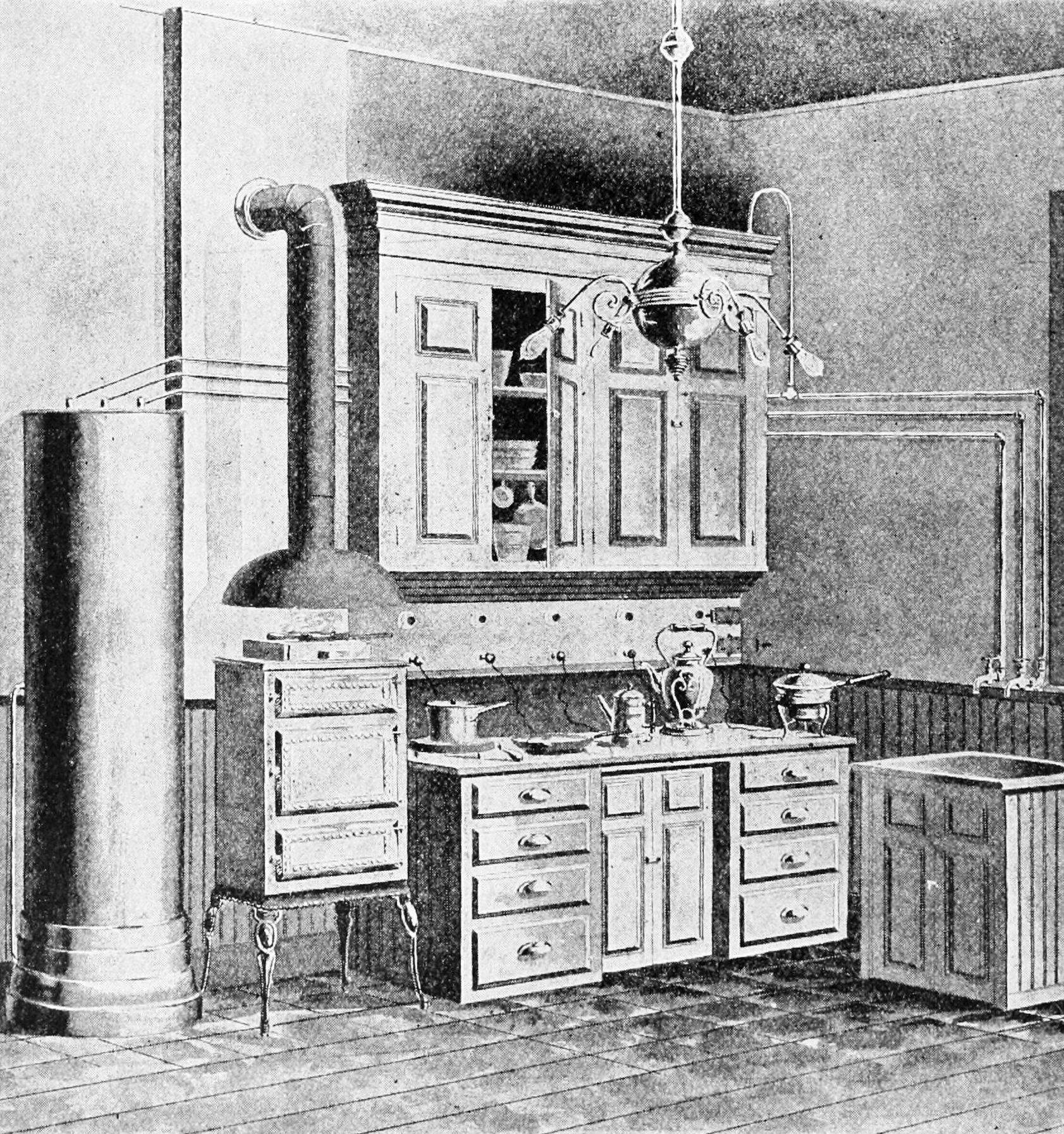
Electric kitchen

- A device that made plates for printing books in Braille, unveiled by Frank Haven Hall, who met Helen Keller and her teacher Anne Sullivan at the exhibit.
- Moving walkway, or travelator
- The third rail giving electric power to elevated trains led directly to its first continuing US use.
- The "clasp locker", a clumsy slide fastener and forerunner to the zipper was demonstrated by Whitcomb L. Judson
- Elongated coins (the squashed penny)
- Ferris Wheel
- First fully electrical kitchen including an automatic dishwasher
- Phosphorescent lamps (a precursor to fluorescent lamps)
- John T. Shayne & Company, the local Chicago furrier helped America gain respect on the world stage of manufacturing
- Clark cell as a standard for measuring voltage
- A first prototype of a pressurized aerosol spray, by Francis Davis Millet.
- The first practical electric automobile, invented by William Morrison.

=== Organizations ===
- Congress of Mathematicians, precursor to International Congress of Mathematicians
- Interfaith dialogue (the Parliament of the World's Religions)
  - First recorded public mention of the Baháʼí Faith in North America

=== Performances ===
- The poet and humorist Benjamin Franklin King, Jr. first performed at the exposition.
- Bodybuilder Eugen Sandow demonstrated feats of strength, promoted by Florenz Ziegfeld.
- Magician Harry Houdini and his brother Theodore performed their magic act at the Midway.

== Later years ==
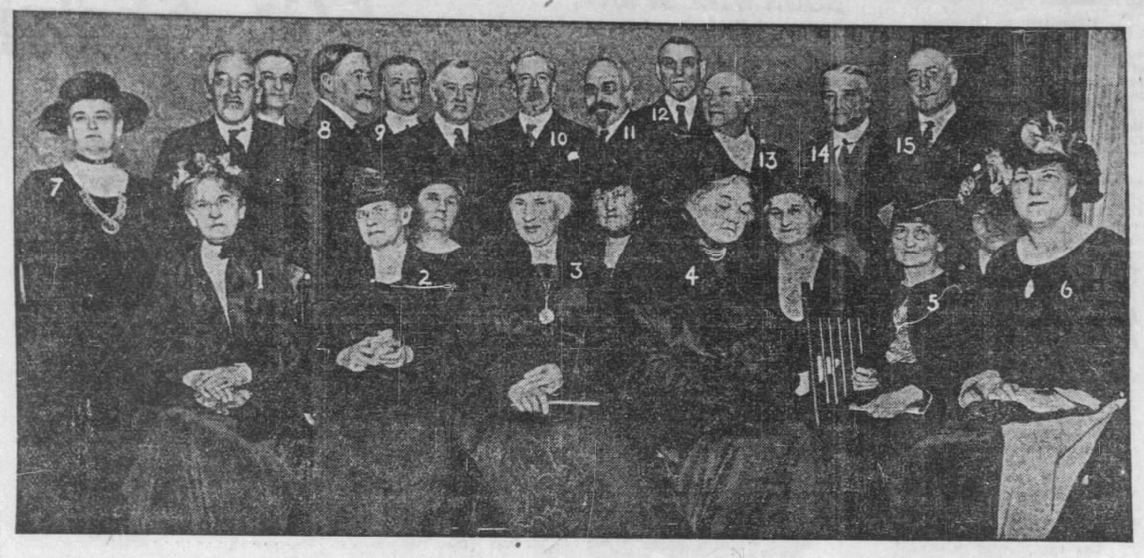
In 1923, notable Chicagoans associated with the fair met again.

Postal memorabilia
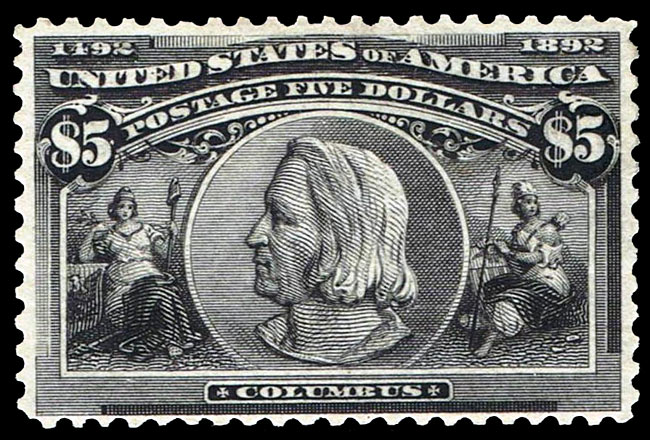
Columbus postage issued at the Exposition

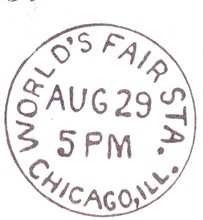
1893 postmark used at the Exposition

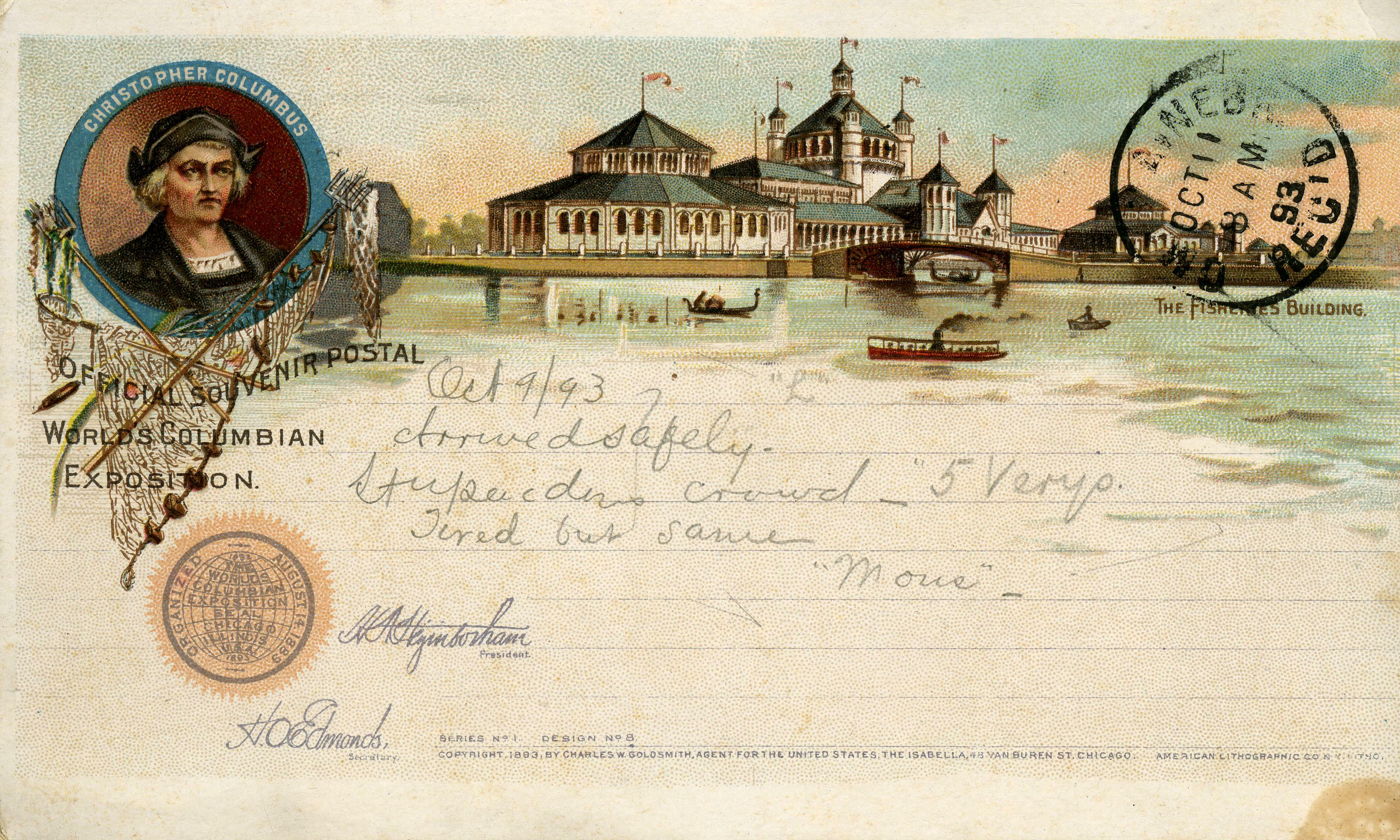
The Fisheries Building at the Exposition

The exposition was one influence leading to the rise of the City Beautiful movement. Results included grand buildings and fountains built around Olmstedian parks, shallow pools of water on axis to central buildings, larger park systems, broad boulevards and parkways and, after the start of the 20th century, zoning laws and planned suburbs. Examples of the City Beautiful movement's works include the City of Chicago, the Columbia University campus, and the National Mall in Washington, D.C.

After the fair closed, J.C. Rogers, a banker from Wamego, Kansas, purchased several pieces of art that had hung in the rotunda of the U.S. Government Building. He also purchased architectural elements, artifacts and buildings from the fair. He shipped his purchases to Wamego. Many of the items, including the artwork, were used to decorate his theater, now known as the Columbian Theatre.

Memorabilia such as books, tokens, published photographs, and well-printed admission tickets saved by guests are popular among collectors.

The George Washington University maintains a small collection of exposition tickets for viewing and research purposes. The collection is currently cared for by GWU's Special Collections Research Center, located in the Estelle and Melvin Gelman Library.

When the exposition ended the Ferris Wheel was moved to Chicago's north side, next to an exclusive neighborhood. An unsuccessful Circuit Court action was filed against the owners of the wheel to have it moved. The wheel stayed there until it was moved to St. Louis for the 1904 World's Fair.

The Columbian Exposition has celebrated many anniversaries since the fair in 1893. The Chicago Historical Society held an exhibition to commemorate the fair. The Grand Illusions exhibition was centered around the idea that the Columbian Exposition was made up of a series of illusions. The commemorative exhibition contained partial reconstructions, a video detailing the fair, and a catalogue similar to the one sold at the World's Fair of 1893.

== Academic views ==
Henry Adams wrote in his 1907 Education: "The Exposition denied philosophy ... [S]ince Noah’s Ark, no such Babel of loose and ill-jointed, such vague and ill-defined and unrelated thoughts and half-thoughts and experimental out-cries... had ruffled the surface of the Lakes."

Michel-Rolph Trouillot wrote that the academic aspect of the event was not very important, even though the Harvard Peabody Museum, the Smithsonian Institution, and Franz Boas made contributions.

== In popular culture ==
- The Exposition is portrayed in the 2017 historical film, The Current War, concerning the competition between George Westinghouse and Thomas Edison to establish the dominant form of electricity in the United States.
- 1893: A World's Fair Mystery, an interactive fiction (text adventure) by Peter Nepstad that recreates the Exposition in detail
- Against the Day, a historical fictional novel by Thomas Pynchon, the beginning of which takes place at the Exposition
- The Devil in the White City, a non-fiction book intertwining the true tales of the architect behind the Exposition and serial killer H. H. Holmes
- Timebound, a time travel novel by Rysa Walker, culminates at the Exposition.
- Expo: Magic of the White City, a 2005 documentary film about the Exposition by Mark Bussler
- The Exposition served as the setting for Against Odds, a novel by Emma Murdock Van Deventer.
- Jimmy Corrigan, the Smartest Kid on Earth, a graphic novel by Chris Ware set in part at the Exposition
- Wonder of the Worlds, an adventure novel by Sesh Heri, where Nikola Tesla, Mark Twain, and Houdini pursue Martian agents who have stolen a powerful crystal from Tesla at the Exposition
- The Will of an Eccentric, an adventure novel by Jules Verne, evokes the Exposition with admiration in the early chapters.
- The Exposition appears in the season 1 episode "The World's Columbian Exposition" of the NBC series Timeless.
- The Exposition is referenced in Sufjan Stevens's song in his album Illinois, "Come On! Feel The Illinoise!", which consists of two parts. Part 1 is titled, "World's Columbian Exposition".
- The Exposition plays a role in the historical novel, Owen Glen, by Ben Ames Williams.
- Mystery Train Island, a video game level on Poptropica released in 2011, is based on and is partially set at the Exposition, referred to as the 1893 Chicago World's Fair in the game.
- BioShock Infinite, a 2013 video game. The floating city-state of Columbia was created at the Exposition and toured across the world to promote American exceptionalism.
- The exposition is a key setting of the novel The City Beautiful by Aden Polydoros.
- The exposition appears in the travel book by Aleko Konstantinov, To Chicago and Back.
- The young adult novel Fair Weather by Illinois native author Richard Peck takes thirteen-year-old Rosie Beckett and her family from their downstate family farm to the 1893 World's Fair in Chicago.
- The Dark Pictures Anthology: The Devil in Me, a 2022 video game which was inspired by H. H. Holmes murder castle
- The Exposition appears in "1893", the third episode of the second season of the Marvel Cinematic Universe (MCU) television series Loki (2023). In the episode, Loki and Mobius M. Mobius attend the Exposition in search of Ravonna Renslayer and Miss Minutes, and encounter Victor Timely, a variant of Kang the Conqueror, whose help they need to save the multiverse.
- The Exposition also appears in the post-credits scene of the MCU film Ant-Man and the Wasp: Quantumania (2023), which uses footage from Loki season 2 despite being released before it.
- The exposition is one of the settings of the novel The Future of Another Timeline by Annalee Newitz.

== See also ==
- Signal of Peace
- Kwanusila
- List of world expositions
- List of world's fairs
- Benjamin W. Kilburn, stereoscopic view concession
- H. H. Holmes, serial killer associated with the 1893 World's Fair
- St. John Cantius Church (Chicago), whose main altar, as well as its matching two side altars, reputedly originate from the 1893 Columbian Exposition
- Spectacle Reef Light
- World's Largest Stove
- World's Largest Cedar Bucket
- Fairy lamp, candle sets popularized at Queen Victoria's Golden Jubilee which were used to illuminate an island at the Expo
- St. Louis Autumnal Festival Association
- Columbian half dollar, issued as an official silver commemorative coin for the event in 1892-1893
