= Bell (disambiguation) =

A bell is a percussion instrument, usually cup-shaped.

Bell may also refer to:

== Music ==
- Bell (wind instrument), a part of a wind instrument
- Bell cymbal, a type of cymbal, tending to be thick and uniformly so, and small
- Bell effect, a musical technique
- Cymbal bell, the most central part of a cymbal

== Signals ==
- Bell on an engine order telegraph, a communications device used on ships and submarines
- Alarm bell, used to alert of a fire or burglary, or as part of a traditional alarm clock
- Church bell, indicating when to go to church
- Doorbell, a signaling device to alert residents to visitors
- Division bell, used in a parliament to call members to a vote
- Last call bell, a signal that a bar is closing soon
- School bell, used for transitions during a school day
- Ship's bell, used for marking time on a ship

== People ==
=== Given name or nickname ===
==== Music ====
- Bell (singer) (born 2000), Swedish singer and songwriter
- Bell Duncan (1849–1934), Scottish traditional singer
- Bell Nuntita (born 1983), Thai actress, singer, entertainer, and radio DJ
- Bell T. Ritchie (1893–1970), American musician and vocalist
- Bell Robertson (1841–1922), Scottish reciter of folk songs
- Bell Yu Tian, Malaysian singer-songwriter

==== Other arts ====
- bell hooks (Gloria Jean Watkins, 1952–2021), American author, academic, and activist
- Bell Ngasri (born 1980), Malaysian actor and comedian
- Bell Nuntita (born 1983), Thai actress, singer, entertainer, and radio DJ
- Bell Elliott Palmer (1873–1947), American writer

==== Science and academia ====
- bell hooks (Gloria Jean Watkins, 1952–2021), American author, academic, and activist
- Bell M. Shimada (1922–1958), American fisheries scientist
- Bell Taylor (1829–1909), English ophthalmic surgeon
- Bell I. Wiley (1906–1980), American historian

==== Other fields ====
- Bell Berghuis (born 1985), Dutch snowboarder
- Bell Cox (1826–1897), Irish Anglican priest
- Bell Greve (1894–1957), American social worker
- Bell Ribeiro-Addy (born 1985), British politician

=== Surname ===
- Bell (surname), a list of people with the surname Bell, most notably:
  - Alexander Graham Bell (1847–1922), inventor of the telephone
  - Jocelyn Bell Burnell (1943-), astrophysicist who discovered pulsars
  - John Stewart Bell (1928–1990), originator of Bell's theorem in quantum physics

== Places ==
=== Argentina ===
- Bell Ville, Córdoba Province
- City Bell, Buenos Aires Province

=== Australia ===
- Bell, New South Wales
- Bell, Queensland, a town in the Western Downs Region

=== Canada ===
- Bell Island (Newfoundland and Labrador)
- Bell Peninsula, Nunavut
- Bell River (Quebec)

=== Germany ===
- Bell, Mayen-Koblenz, a municipality
- Bell, Rhein-Hunsrück, a municipality

=== United States ===
- Bell, California
- Bell, Florida
- Bell, Oklahoma
- Bell, Wisconsin
- Bell Canyon, California
- Bell City, Missouri
- Bell County, Kentucky
- Bell County, Texas
- Bell Township, Pennsylvania (disambiguation)

=== Other places ===
- Bell (crater), on the Moon
- Bell, South Africa
- Bell Creek (disambiguation)

== Businesses ==
=== Telecommunications ===
- Bell Canada, a Canadian telecommunications company
  - Bell Internet, an Internet service provided by Bell
- Bell Labs, a research & development organization founded by AT&T, now owned by Nokia
- Bell System, the organization that provided telephone service in the US until 1984
- Bell Telephone Company, founded in 1877 by the family of Alexander Graham Bell

=== Other businesses ===
- Bell Aircraft, a former American aircraft manufacturer
  - Bell Textron, formerly Bell Helicopter
- Bell ID, a Dutch software company
- Bell Inn, Enfield, London, England
- Bell Records, a record label
- Bell Sports, a helmet manufacturer
- Bell (St. Paul's Churchyard), a historical bookseller in London
- Bell's Brewery, based in Michigan, U.S.
- Bell's whisky, a brand of Scotch

== Science and technology ==
- Bell, the body of a jellyfish
- Bell character, in computing, a device control code
- Bell number, in mathematics
- Bell polynomials, in mathematics
- Bell state, in quantum information science
- Diving bell, a cable-suspended underwater airtight chamber

== Transportation ==
- Bell station (disambiguation)
- SS Empire Bell, a ship
- USS Bell, the name of two U.S. Navy ships
- Bell (cyclecar), made in 1920
- Bell maneuver, a version of the tailslide in aerobatics

== Other uses ==
- Bell (fictional currency), in the game Animal Crossing
- Bell (typeface)
- Bell, a character from the fourth season of Battle for Dream Island, an animated web series
- Super Bell, a power-up in Super Mario 3D World

== See also ==
- Bel (disambiguation)
- Bell High School (disambiguation)
- Bell House (disambiguation)
- Bell Lake (disambiguation)
- Bell pepper
- Bell, Book & Candle (disambiguation)
- Belle (disambiguation)
- Bells (disambiguation)
- The Bell (disambiguation)
- The Bells (disambiguation)
- Justice Bell (disambiguation)
- Old Bell (disambiguation)
- Glockenspiel (disambiguation)
- Alexander Graham Bell honors and tributes
- Service bell
