= Bell Creek =

Bell Creek or Bells Creek may refer to:

== Australia ==
- Bells Creek, Queensland, a locality in the Sunshine Coast Region
- Bells Creek (Blacktown, New South Wales), a river in Greater Western Sydney

== United States ==
- Bell Canyon, a creek in Orange County, California
- Bell Creek (Gasconade River tributary), a stream in Missouri
- Bell Creek (Elkhorn River), a river in Nebraska
- Belle Creek, Montana, a city in Montana
- Bell Creek (Pine Creek), in Luzerne County, Pennsylvania
- Bell Creek (Southern California), a tributary of the Los Angeles River in Los Angeles, California
- Bell Creek Township, Burt County, Nebraska, a township in Nebraska
- Bell Creek (Tunkhannock Creek), in Susquehanna County, Pennsylvania
- Bells Creek (West Virginia)

== See also ==
- Bell (disambiguation)
- Belle Creek (disambiguation)
