= Bell School =

Bell School may refer to:

- Alexander Graham Bell School (Chicago, Illinois), United States
- Bell School, an elementary school in Marblehead Public Schools, Massachusetts, United States

== See also ==
- Alexander Graham Bell honors and tributes#Honorary names of schools, organizations, awards, and placenames
- Bell Public School, Oklahoma, United States
- Bell High School (disambiguation)
