= Bell Hotel =

Bell Hotel or Hotel Bell may refer to:

- Bell Hotel, Driffield, East Riding of Yorkshire, England
- Bell Hotel, Epping, Essex, England
- Bell Hotel, Thetford, Norfolk, England
- Hotel Bell (Alva, Oklahoma), U.S.
- Bell Hotel (Ephrata, Washington), U.S., NRHP-listed in Grant County
- Old Bell (disambiguation), the name of several hotels

== See also ==
- Bell Tower Hotel, Xian, China
