= Eastern Creek =

Eastern Creek may refer to:

- Eastern Creek (New South Wales), a tributary watercourse in the Hawkesbury-Nepean catchment
- Eastern Creek, New South Wales, a suburb in Western Sydney bisected by Eastern Creek
- Sydney Motorsport Park, formerly known as Eastern Creek Raceway
