= Bell Tower of Xi'an =

Building in Xi'an, China

Coordinates: 34.261°N 108.942°E

- 西安钟楼
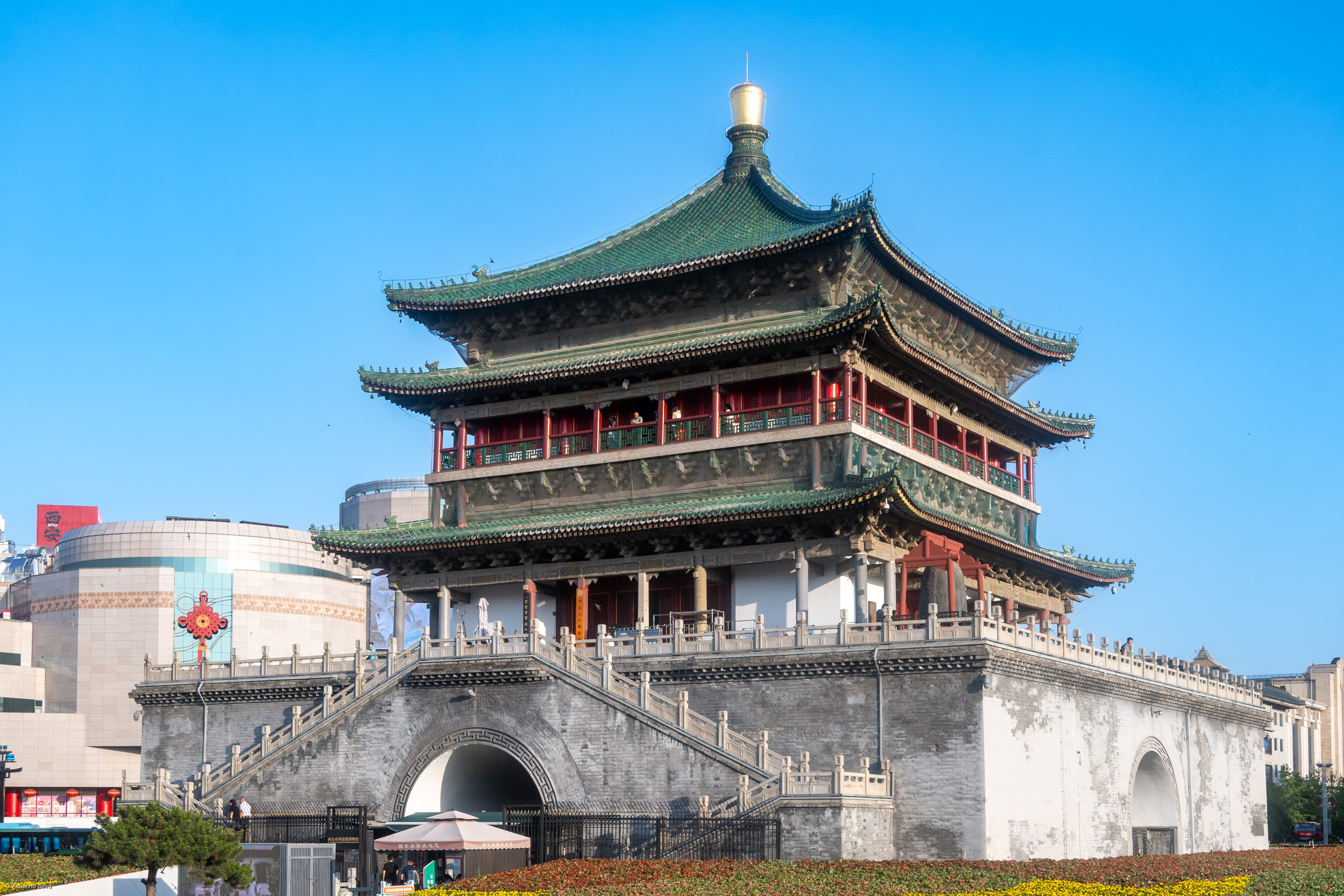
- Interactive map of the Bell Tower of Xi'an area

General information
- Location: Xi'an, Shaanxi, China
- Completed: 1384

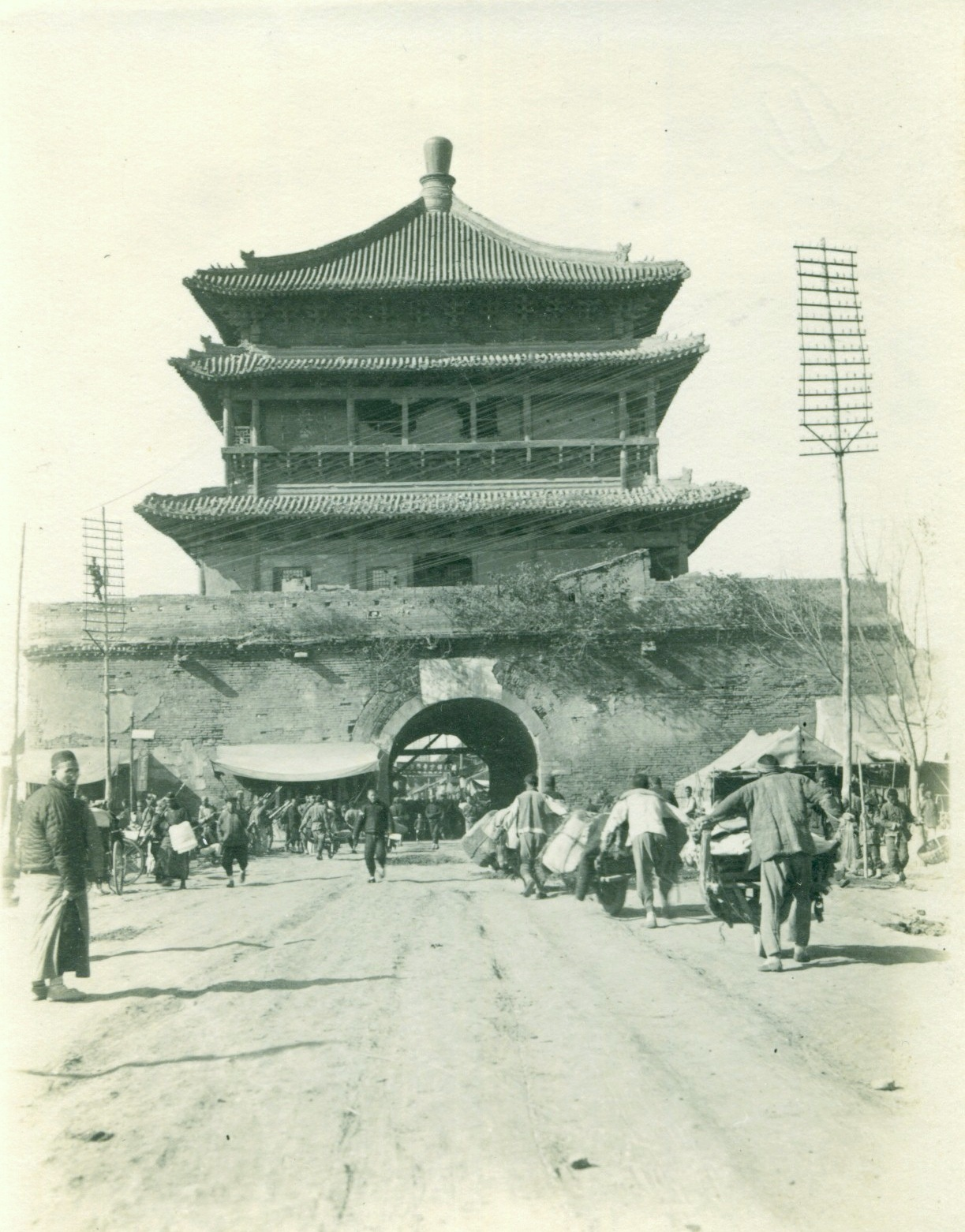

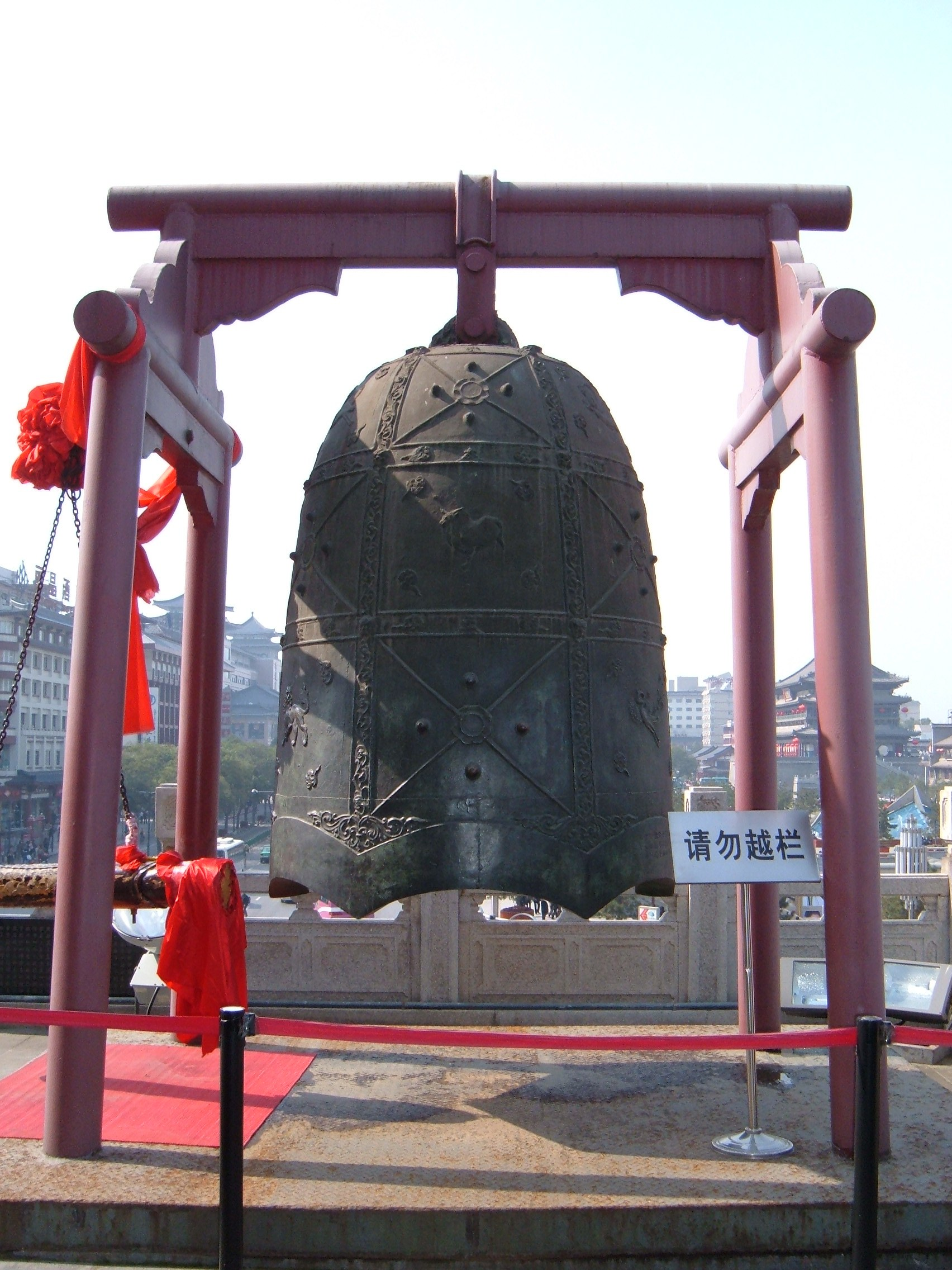
The jingyun bell, cast in 711 during the Tang dynasty, 247 cm high and 6,500 kg.

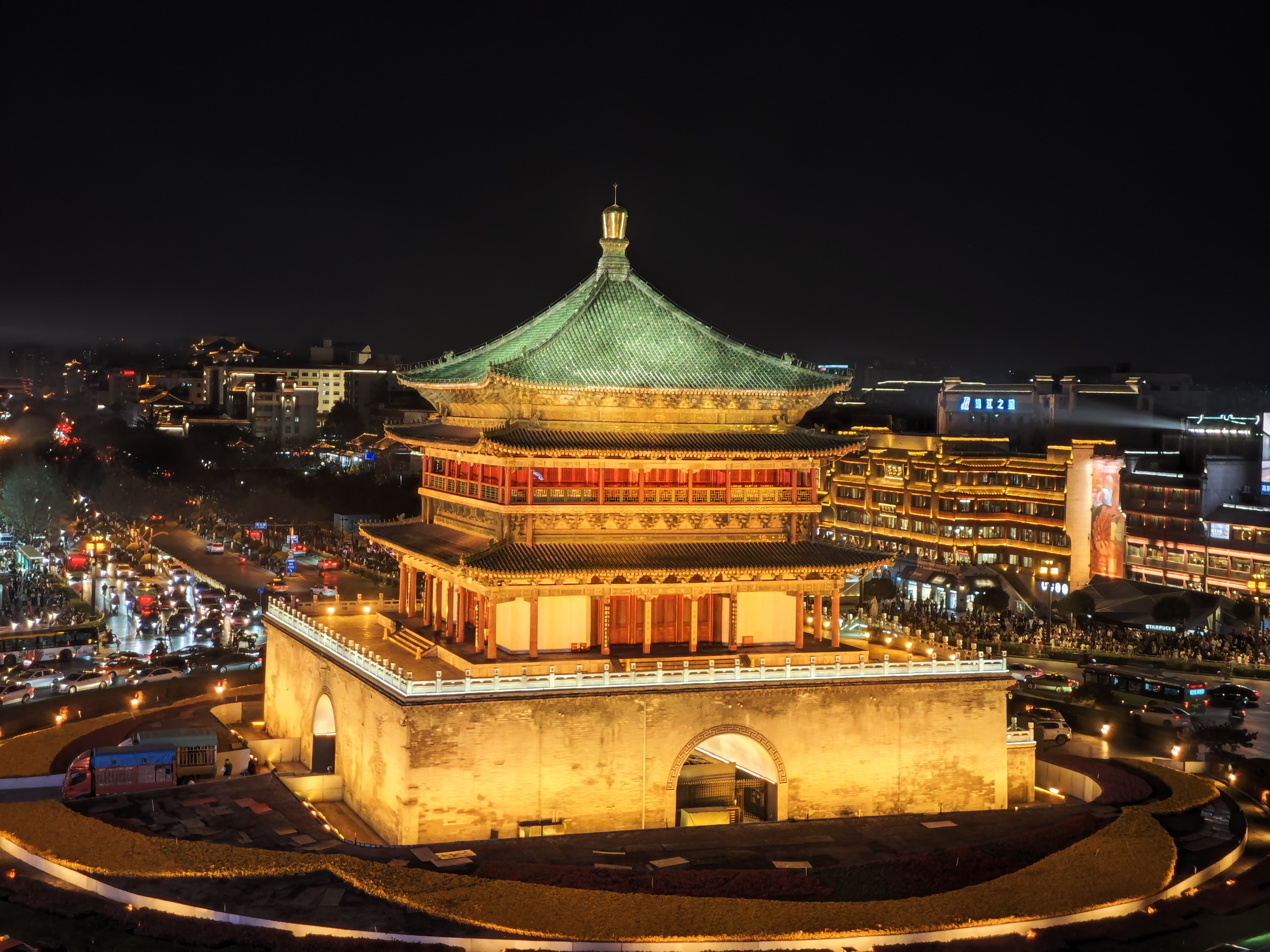
Bell Tower at night

The Bell Tower of Xi'an (simplified Chinese: 西安钟楼; traditional Chinese: 西安鐘樓; pinyin: Xī'ān Zhōnglóu), built in 1384 during the early Ming dynasty, is a symbol of the city of Xi'an and one of the grandest of its kind in China and lays on the axis of the Imperial Way. The Tang-dynasty Jingyun Bell formerly housed in the tower was moved to the Stele Forest Museum in 1953; a replica was installed at the tower in 1997. The tower base is square and it covers an area of 1,377 m^{2} (14,820 sq ft). The tower is a brick and timber structure and close to 40 m (130 ft) high. It is located in the center of Xi'an, at the intersection of the four streets of the east, west, south and north. It is the largest and most preserved one amongst the many bell towers left over from the history of China.

== History ==
Previous iterations of bell towers in modern-day Xi'an existed since the Tang dynasty, The current Xi'an Bell Tower is said to have been built in the 17th year of Hongwu in the Ming dynasty (1384). It was originally located at the Yingxiang Temple (迎祥观) of Guangji Street, north of West Street, facing the Xi'an Drum Tower, about one kilometer away from its current location. At that time, this place was directly opposite the north and south city gates, and it was the center of the city. With the expansion of Chang'an in the early Ming dynasty, the city center gradually moved eastward. After two centuries, the city gates were rebuilt, and the new four streets of East, South, West, and North were formed. The bell tower at Yingxiang Temple thus appeared to deviate from the center of the city.

In 1582, under the auspices of the Shaanxi investigating censor Gong Yuxian (龔懋賢), the county magistrates of Xianning and Chang'an were ordered to relocate the bell tower to the present site. While the pedestal was rebuilt, the intrinsic structure of the tower utilized original material, and as such the cost was comparatively low and reconstruction quickly completed. Gong Yuxian's "Ode to the Bell Tower Relocating East" (钟楼东迁歌) recorded the details of the project.

The bell tower underwent substantial repairs in 1699, 1740 and 1840. Among them, in 1740, the governor Zhang Wei rebuilt the tower according to the original structure and found that the house covered with Jingyun bell was so airtight that the bell sounded "not to be out" and the sound outside was small. Therefore, the Tang dynasty "Jingyun" bell, which was originally suspended in the room, was removed from the outdoors, so that the sound of the time was far-reaching, and he wrote the "Record of the Refurbishment of the Xi'an Bell Tower" (重修西安钟楼记).

On October 10, 1939, the bell tower was badly damaged in a Japanese air raid. Repair work was carried out afterwards by the Xijing Municipal Construction Committee Engineering Office.

After the founding of the People's Republic of China, the Xi'an Bell Tower was overhauled five times. In August 1956, it was listed in the Shaanxi Provincial People's Government as the first batch of key cultural relics protection units in Shaanxi Province. It was officially opened to the public in 1984. In November 1996, it was included in the national key cultural relics protection unit.

== Function ==
Similar to other Chinese bell towers, the Xi'an Bell Tower was mainly used for time reporting in pre-modern times. With the progress of the times, its traditional functions have been gradually phased out, and now it is open to the society as a national-level cultural relics protection unit for tourism and sightseeing. Visitors can purchase tickets to visit the building.

It has also been used for many other purposes in history. During the Revolution of 1911, the Rebels fought fiercely with the Qing army deployed here. During the National Protection War, the Shaanxi warlord Chen Shupan started the riots against Yuan Shikai from here. In 1927, Shilin, who came back from studying in the United States, opened a sound cinema here. This is the first cinema in Xi'an history. During the Anti-Japanese War, the Xi'an Bell Tower became an alarm station for warning the Japanese air raids because of its high terrain. The Kuomintang also used it to imprison criminals. During the period after the founding of the People's Republic of China, it became the main platform for parades and celebrations on Labor Day and National Day.

== Architectural features ==
=== Form ===
The lower part of the Xi'an Bell Tower is a square-shaped pedestal with a masonry structure. The surface is made of blue brick and the base is a two-story wooden structure. The height from the ground to the top of the building is 36 meters, of which the base is 8.6 meters high. Each side is 35.5 meters long and has a construction area of about 1,377.4 square meters. There are stairs inside to hover up. The overall style is typical of the Ming Dynasty architectural style. The top is a triple-sided four-sided spire structure supported by a brawl. The top part is the "golden top" of the real gold platinum wrapped in the inner heart of the wood. The dark green roof tiles are covered with dark green glazed tiles, and the interior is decorated with gold paintings. In the middle of the pedestal, there are holes intersecting each other with a cross of about 6 meters. In the past, there were passages for the intersection of four streets in the southeast and northwest, and pedestrian vehicles passed through the cave. With the development of urban construction, the hole can not adapt to the traffic flow needs, and now the hole has been closed. There is a road turntable around the clock tower, and there is a circular passage for the pedestrians underground.

=== Emboss ===
The door and window carvings of the Xi'an Bell Tower are exquisite and complex, showing the decorative arts prevailing in the Ming and Qing Dynasties. There are 8 reliefs on each door leaf.

== Cultural relics ==
=== Giant Bell ===
The original giant bell of Xi'an Bell Tower was the "Jingyun" bell cast by the year of Jingyun in the Tang dynasty. It was originally used by Jinglong temple in Chang'an City (currently in Xi'an West Street today). It was moved to Xi'an Bell Tower in the early Ming dynasty. In 1953, the Jingyun bell was moved to Stele Forest Museum and is now on display there.

The Xi'an Municipal Bureau of Cultural Relics made a replica of the Jingyun Bell. It was hung on the northwest corner of the base of the Xi'an Bell Tower on January 30, 1997 and is now open to tourists. The imitation Jingyun bell looks similar to the original bell. The height is 2.45 meters, the weight is 6.5 tons, and the outer diameter of the bell skirt is 1.65 meters.

=== Inscription ===
The west wall of the first floor hall of Xi'an Bell Tower is inlaid with three inscriptions. The first one is the inscription on the inscription after the Xi'an Municipal People's Government renovated the clock tower in 1953. The second one is the Shaanxi governor Zhang Yishu after the five-year major overhaul by the Qianlong Emperor. The "Record of the Refurbishment of the Xi'an Bell Tower" (重修西安钟楼记) monument was written; the third is the "Ode to the Bell Tower Relocating East" (钟楼东迁歌) monument written by the Shaanxi investigating censor Gong Yuxian.

=== Couplet ===
On the second floor of Xi'an Bell Tower, there is a couplet on each sides of the doorpost, and they are all added recently.

== Legends ==
There are several legends regarding the Bell Tower, one of them tells:

In Ming Dynasty, several earthquakes struck Guanzhong area, thousands were dead and injured. Then a legend appeared: There was a great river flowing across the center of Xi'an City. A dragon in the river was always active and caused trouble, so an earthquake occurred. An official of Xi'an government believed these words, so he ordered the blacksmiths of the whole city to make a several thousand feet of long iron chain in order to lock the dragon and sink it to river. He then ordered 5,000 craftsmen to repair the Bell Tower day and night in order to use the tower to restrain the dragon. He believed this would suppress the dragon firmly under the river and so it would no longer be active and cause trouble again. After establishing the Bell Tower, earthquakes never occurred in Xi'an again.

—

According to another legend:

The forefather of Ming Dynasty named Zhu Yuanzhang was born into a poor family and his parents died early. He depended on tending sheep for others when he was very little. When he grew up, he left home and became a monk. When he became the emperor, he was afraid that the real emperor ("dragon son of heaven"-means king sent from heaven, a dragon is the symbol of the emperor) in the country somewhere will fight for the throne with him. He then ordered to build the bell towers to suppress the "dragon power". Xi'an was the emperor city in ancient times and it was the place of emperor's throne and the "dragon power" was very strong of course. Zhu Yuanzhang was afraid, so the Bell Tower in Xi'an was built not only quickly, but also very tall.

—

== See also ==
- Drum Tower of Xi'an
- Bell Tower Hotel
