= Die Glocke =

Die Glocke (German, 'the bell') may refer to:

- Die Glocke (magazine), a German socialist journal published 1915–1925
- Die Glocke (Bremen), Germany, a concert house in Bremen
- Die Glocke (conspiracy theory), about a supposedly secret Nazi weapon
- Die Glocke (film), a silent film
- Die Glocke (newspaper), a daily newspaper in Oelde, Germany
- "Die Glocke", an episode of 12 Monkeys

== See also ==
- Glockenspiel (disambiguation)
- Glock (disambiguation)
