= The Bell =

The Bell may refer to:

== Arts, entertainment and media ==
=== Literature ===
- The Bell (magazine), an Irish literary magazine 1940–1954
- The Bell (novel), by Iris Murdoch, 1958
- "The Bell", a poem by Ralph Waldo Emerson
- The Bell (newspaper), an independent online newspaper in Russia
- Kolokol (newspaper) ('Bell'), a 19th century Russian and French language newspaper in London and Geneva

=== Music ===
- "The Bell" (Mike Oldfield song), 1992
- "The Bell" (Yeat song), 2025
- "The Bell", a 2002 album by Stephan Said

=== Television ===
- The Bell (TV series), a 1982 British television series

== Pubs in England ==
- The Bell, City of London, England
- The Bell Inn, Aldworth, Berkshire, England
- The Bell Inn, Long Hanborough, Oxfordshire, England
- The Bell Inn, Nottingham, England
- The Bell Inn, formerly at 9 and 9A Southgate Street, Gloucester

== Other uses ==
- Dundonald Bluebell F.C., a football club in Scotland, nicknamed The Bell

== See also ==
- Die Glocke (disambiguation)
- The Bells (disambiguation)
- Bell (disambiguation)
