= Bells =

Bells may refer to:

- Bell, a musical instrument

== Arts and entertainment ==
- Bells (album), by Albert Ayler, 1965
- "Bells", a song by Fred Wesley and Horny Horns from the 1994 album The Final Blow
- "Bells" (Blackadder), a 1986 TV episode
- "Bells", a 2011 episode of New Girl
- Murder by Phone, or Bells, a 1982 Canadian-American film

== Business and brands ==
- Bell's Brewery, an American craft brewing company
- Bell's (restaurant), a French restaurant in Los Alamos, California
- Bell's whisky, a blended whisky
- Bells Stores, a defunct English convenience store chain

== Places ==
- Bells, North Carolina, U.S., an unincorporated community
- Bells, Tennessee, U.S., a city
- Bells, Texas, U.S., a city
- Bells Beach, Victoria, Australia, a locality

== Other uses ==
- Bells (suit), a playing card suit
- "Bells", nickname of former professional basketball player Joe Colone (1924–2009)
- Bell's theorem, in physics, created by Irish physicist John Stewart Bell
- Bellingham Bells, an American baseball team
- Ship's bells, used for timekeeping
- The Bells of 1961, a meteorite fall in Texas, United States
- "Bells", a fictional currency in game Animal Crossing

== See also ==
- The Bells (disambiguation)
- Bel (disambiguation)
- Belis (disambiguation)
- Bell (disambiguation)
- Bell (surname)
- Bell House (disambiguation)
- Belle (disambiguation)
- The Bell (disambiguation)
- Carillon, a musical instrument
- Glockenspiel, a musical instrument
- Tubular bells, a musical instrument also known as chimes
- Paul Revere, 18th century bell caster
