= List of people from Jacksonville, Illinois =

The following list includes notable people who were born or have lived in Jacksonville, Illinois. For a similar list organized alphabetically by last name, see the category page People from Jacksonville, Illinois.

== Authors and academics ==
- Dr. Greene Vardiman Black (1836–1915), considered the "father of modern dentistry"; first to use nitrous oxide gas for extracting teeth without pain
- Frank Haven Hall, inventor of the Hall Braille Writer and other Braille printing devices
- Everett Dean Martin (born and raised in Jacksonville), writer, lecturer, social psychologist, and an advocate of adult education; final director of the People's Institute of Cooper Union in New York City, 1922–1934
- Martha Capps Oliver (1845–1917), poet, hymnwriter
- Bell Elliott Palmer (1873–1947), playwright, born and died in Jacksonville
- Willis Polk, architect
- J. F. Powers (1917–1999), Roman Catholic short story author and novelist; born in Jacksonville
- Alfred Henry Sturtevant (1891–1970), geneticist; constructed the first genetic map of a chromosome (1913)
- Wilson "Bob" Tucker (1914–2006), mystery, adventure, and science fiction writer; lived in Jacksonville
- Jonathan Baldwin Turner (1805–1899), classical scholar, botanist, and political activist
- Janice May Udry (1928–2023), Caldecott Medal-winning children's author, born in Jacksonville
- Bari Wood (1936–), science fiction, crime and horror author, born in Jacksonville

== Media and arts ==
- Marjorie Best (1903–1997), Academy Award-winning costume designer; born in Jacksonville
- Roger Deem (1958–2020), photographer
- William Fitzsimmons, folk singer; lived in Jacksonville
- Richard Moore (1925–2009), cinematographer and co-founder of Panavision; born in Jacksonville
- Kyra Phillips, correspondent for CNN and HLN, raised in Jacksonville
- Frank Reaugh (1860–1945), western artist
- Liam Sullivan, actor; born in Jacksonville

== Military ==
- Benjamin Grierson (1826–1911), Civil War era general; commanded the all-Black 10th Cavalry known as Buffalo Soldiers; music teacher from Jacksonville
- John J. Hardin (1810–1847), congressman; killed as a colonel leading the First Regiment, Illinois Volunteer Infantry, at the Battle of Buena Vista during the Mexican War
- Martin Davis Hardin (1837–1923), brigadier general during the Civil War; born in Jacksonville

== Politics and law ==
- James M. Barnes (1899–1958), U.S. congressman
- William H. Barnes, jurist
- William Jennings Bryan (1860–1925), lawyer and politician; ran for US president; known for his involvement in the Scopes Trial
- J. Edward Day (1914–1996), U.S. Postmaster General
- Stephen A. Douglas (1813–1861), U.S. senator and presidential candidate; settled in Jacksonville
- Joseph Duncan (1794–1844), sixth governor of Illinois
- Nancy Farmer (1956–), Missouri state treasurer
- Paul Findley (1921–2019), U.S. congressman
- Hugh Green (1887–1968), Illinois legislator and lawyer
- Edward E. Johnston (1918–2011), high commissioner of the Trust Territory of the Pacific Islands
- Ruth Bryan Owen (1885–1954), U.S. congresswoman, ambassador to Denmark and Iceland, daughter of William Jennings Bryan
- Mary Louise Preis (1941–), state congressman from Maryland
- Harris Rowe (1923–2013), politician, lawyer, and businessman
- Richard Yates Rowe (1888–1973), politician and businessman
- Andrew Russel (1854–1934), Illinois politician and businessman
- Paul Samuell (1886–1938), Illinois Supreme Court justice
- Wiley Scribner (1840–1889), politician and acting governor of Montana Territory
- Owen P. Thompson (1852–1933), judge of the Seventh Judicial District of Illinois and a delegate to Democratic National Convention from Illinois in 1904
- Richard Yates (1818–1873), U.S. congressman (1851–1855) and senator (1865–1871); 13th governor of Illinois (1861–1865)
- Richard Yates Jr. (1860–1936), 22nd governor of Illinois (1901–1905)

== Sports ==
- Jerry Barber (1916–1994), golfer with the PGA Tour, winner of 1961 PGA Championship
- Doug Brady (1969–), second baseman for the Chicago White Sox
- Red Dorman (1900–1974), outfielder for the Cleveland Indians
- Jim Hackett (1877–1961), pitcher and first baseman for the St. Louis Cardinals
- "Blake" Hance (1996–), offensive lineman for the Cleveland Browns
- Mabel Holle (1920–2011), third basewoman and outfielder in the All-American Girls Professional Baseball League; born in Jacksonville
- Milton McPike (1939–2008), tight end for the San Francisco 49ers, educator and community leader; born in Jacksonville
- Brett Merriman (1966–), pitcher for the Minnesota Twins
- Ken Norton (1943–2013), boxer; broke Muhammad Ali's jaw in a historical heavyweight fight
- Ken Norton, Jr. (1966–), linebacker for Dallas Cowboys and San Francisco 49ers, defensive coordinator for Oakland Raiders; first NFL player to win three consecutive Super Bowls; born in Jacksonville
- Henry Eli "Harry" Staley (1866–1910), pitcher for the St. Louis Browns, Boston Beaneaters, and Pittsburgh Pirates; born in Jacksonville
- F. Calvert "Cal" Strong (1907–2001), Olympic water polo bronze medalist; born in Jacksonville
- Luther Haden "Dummy" Taylor (1875–1958), coach and pitcher for New York Giants and Cleveland Bronchos; died in Jacksonville
