= Reedy Creek (Blacktown, Sydney) =

Coordinates: 33°49′S 150°51′E

Reedy Branch of Reedy Creek

Location
- Country: Australia
- Region: Sydney basin (IBRA), Greater Western Sydney
- Local government area: Fairfield, Blacktown

Physical characteristics
- Source: Horsley Memorial Park
  - location: Horsley Park
- Mouth: confluence with Eastern Creek
  - location: Eastern Creek (suburb)
- Length: 6 km (3.7 mi)

Basin features
- River system: Hawkesbury-Nepean catchment

Reedy Creek, an urban watercourse that is part of the Hawkesbury-Nepean catchment, is located in Greater Western Sydney, New South Wales, Australia.

== Course and features ==
Reedy Creek rises in the western suburbs of Sydney about 2 kilometres (1.2 mi) north-west of the Melville trigonometry station in the Memorial Park located in the suburb of Horsley Park. The creek flows generally north-east by north before reaching its confluence with Eastern Creek, in the suburb of Eastern Creek, west of Sydney Motorsport Park. The course of the creek is approximately 6 kilometres (3.7 mi).

In 2005, the Reedy Creek catchment area was rated the lowest polluting catchment out of the twenty-two catchments in the Blacktown local government area. Whilst only a small proportion of the catchment lies within the City of Blacktown, it is anticipated that future development pressure may lead to significant detrimental changes due to the altering of the run off and stream flow regime and its resulting impacts on the creek.

Reedy Creek is transversed by both the Westlink M7 and Wallgrove Road.

As part of the Streamwatch program, students from Marion Catholic Primary School compare weekly physical and chemical tests on water collected from Reedy Creek.

== See also ==
- Rivers of New South Wales
