= I Can See Your Voice Malaysia (Chinese language) season 1 =

Television game show season

I Can See Your Voice Malaysia
- Season 1
- Starring: Rickman Chia; Orange Tan
- Hosted by: Wind Lee; Xiaoyu; Wong Yinyin
- No. of episodes: 10

Release
- Original network: 8TV
- Original release: 20 August – 29 October 2017

Season chronology
- Next → Season 2

The first season of the Malaysian Mandarin-language television mystery music game show I Can See Your Voice Malaysia premiered on 8TV on 20 August 2017.

== Gameplay ==
=== Format ===
According to the original South Korean rules, the guest artist(s) must attempt to eliminate bad singers during its game phase. At the final performance, the last remaining mystery singer is revealed as either good or bad by means of a duet between them and one of the guest artists.

=== Rounds ===
1. Visual round
  The guest artist is given some time to observe and examine each mystery singer based on its appearance. Afterward, a muted video of each mystery singer that reveals only 0.3 seconds of their singing voice is played as an additional hint.
2. Lip sync round
  Each mystery singer performs a lip sync to a song; good singers mime to a recording of their own, while bad singers mime to a backing track by another vocalist.
3. Evidence round
  A proof of each mystery singer's singing ability (i.e. photo, video, certificates, etc.) is shown on the screen. Good singers have own evidences, while bad singers have their evidences fabricated.

== Episodes ==
=== Guest artists ===
Legend:
Good singer
Bad singer

Episode		Guest artist (Note: Players' notes: For the returning guest artists (who also include foreigners and former good singers), names are displayed in italics.; For the mixed groups, names who identified as bad singers are displayed in italics.)	Mystery singers (In their respective numbers and aliases)					
#	Date	Guest artist	Elimination order					Winner
#	Date	Guest artist	Visual round	Lip sync round		Evidence round		Winner
1	20 August 2017	Z-Chen	1. ()	2. ()	3. ()	4. ()	5. ()	6. ()
2	27 August 2017	Namewee	1. ()	2. ()	3. ()	4. ()	5. ()	6. ()
3	3 September 2017	Geraldine Gan	1. ()	2. ()	3. ()	4. ()	5. ()	6. ()
4	10 September 2017	Nicholas Teo	1. ()	2. ()	3. ()	4. ()	5. ()	6. ()
5	17 September 2017	Bell Yu Tian	1. ()	2. ()	3. ()	4. ()	5. ()	6. ()
6	24 September 2017	Thomas and Jack	1. ()	2. ()	3. ()	4. ()	5. ()	6. ()
7	8 October 2017	Fuying & Sam	1. ()	2. ()	3. ()	4. ()	5. ()	6. ()
8	15 October 2017	Joyce Chu	1. ()	2. ()	3. ()	4. ()	5. ()	6. ()
9	22 October 2017	Rynn Lim	1. ()	2. ()	3. ()	4. ()	5. ()	6. ()
10	29 October 2017	Victor Wong	1. ()	2. ()	3. ()	4. ()	5. ()	6. ()

=== Panelists ===
Legend:
Regular panelist
Guest panelist

Apps		Panelists in attendance (Sorted by first appearance, with episode designations)
g#	p#	Panelists in attendance (Sorted by first appearance, with episode designations)
6	1	Rickman Chia (1–3, 5, 7–8)
5	1	Orange Tan (1–2, 6, 9–10)
4	3	Hoon Mei Sim (1, 4, 6, 10); Luke Loke (3–4, 6–7); Monkey D. (Da.Mon.Ster) (3, 7, 9–10)
2	9	Daniel Fong (1, 5); Winnie Ho (1, 6); KeQing (2, 5); Lim Ching Miau (2, 8); Shir Chong (2, 8); Bryan Ho (2, 10); Chrystina Ng (4–5); Yen Hue Tan (4, 8); Gary Yap (7–8)
1	10	Lynn Lim and Zac Zhi Xiang (1); Brian See (4); Nicholas Song (5); Baki Zainal (6); Pauline Tan (7); Juztin Lan, Tan Ley Teng, and Ky Tha (9); Hanz Koay (10)
