= West Avenue =

West Avenue may refer to:

- West Avenue (Xi'an), a major thoroughfare in China
- West Avenue (Quezon City), one of the major roads in Quezon City, Metro Manila, Philippines
- West Avenue (band), an American rock band from Ames, IA
