= Breakfast Creek (Blacktown, New South Wales) =

Coordinates: 33°45′20″S 150°55′00″E

Breakfast

Location
- Country: Australia
- State: New South Wales
- Region: Sydney basin (IBRA), Greater Western Sydney
- Local government area: Blacktown

Physical characteristics
- Source: Cavanaugh Reserve
  - location: Lalor Park
- Mouth: confluence with Eastern Creek
  - location: Quakers Hill
- Length: 7 km (4.3 mi)
- Basin size: 22.48 km^{2} (8.68 sq mi)

Basin features
- River system: Hawkesbury-Nepean catchment
- Tributaries
  - left: Turner Creek, Ashlar Creek
  - right: Waller Creek

Breakfast Creek, an urban watercourse that is part of the Hawkesbury-Nepean catchment, is located in Greater Western Sydney, New South Wales, Australia.

== Course and features ==
Breakfast Creek rises in the western suburbs of Sydney in Lalor Park, near Cavanaugh Reserve, and flows generally north-west by west, joined by the Turner, Wallar and Ashlar creeks, before reaching its confluence with Eastern Creek, in the suburb of Quakers Hill. The course of the creek is approximately 7 kilometres (4.3 mi).

In 2005, the Breakfast Creek catchment area was rated the third highest polluting catchment out of the twenty-two catchments in the Blacktown local government area. Breakfast Creek is severely modified and has few significant natural values with regard to habitat and longitudinal connectivity. A 900 metres (3,000 ft) concrete channel bisects the creek and fish barriers are present every 300–500 metres (980–1,640 ft). There is little to no connectivity with the floodplain and riparian vegetation is scattered or non-existent. In-stream habitats are homogeneous but both bed and bank are largely stable. There were no significant populations of noxious aquatic weeds identified during the assessment. Large carp were noted throughout the creek during the 2005 study. Breakfast Creek attributes include community usage and access, such as the Ashlar Golf Course. The cycle paths and proximity to sports facilities and schools throughout much of the creek have led to one of the most accessible watercourses within Blacktown.

Evidence of early Aboriginal people has been found in several locations within the City of Blacktown. Shell middens from the Darug people have been found near the sewage treatment plant on Breakfast Creek and South Creek.

Breakfast Creek is transversed by the Westlink M7 and the Richmond railway line at Quakers Hill.

== See also ==
- List of rivers of Australia
- List of rivers of New South Wales (A-K)
- Rivers of New South Wales
