= The Bells =

The Bells may refer to:

== Film and television ==
- The Bells (1911 film), Australian feature-length film
- The Bells (1913 film), directed by Oscar Apfel
- The Bells (1918 film), a lost silent drama
- The Bells (1926 film), directed by James Young, starring Lionel Barrymore and Boris Karloff
- The Bells (1931 film), directed by Harcourt Templeman and Oscar Werndorff
- "The Bells" (Game of Thrones), a 2019 TV episode
- "The Bells", a 2023 episode of Outer Banks

== Music ==
- The Bells (band), a Canadian soft rock band
- The Bells (symphony), by Sergei Rachmaninoff, 1913 (based on the Edgar Allan Poe poem)
- The Bells (Lou Reed album), 1979
- The Bells (Nils Frahm album), 2009
- "The Bells" (Billy Ward and His Dominoes song), 1952
- "The Bells" (The Originals song), 1970
- "The Bells", a 1991 song by Fluke
- "The Bells", a 2006 EP by Jeff Mills
- "The Bells", a song by Pedro the Lion from the 1998 album It's Hard to Find a Friend

== Other uses ==
- The Bells (play), by Leopold Davis Lewis, 1871
- "The Bells" (poem), by Edgar Allan Poe, 1849
- The Bells, a 1914 oil painting by Ilmari Aalto
- The Bells, a demolished carriage house on what is now Brenton Point State Park in Newport, Rhode Island, U.S.

== See also ==
- Bell (disambiguation)
- Bells (disambiguation)
- The Bell (disambiguation)
- The Bells of the Strasbourg Cathedral (Die Glocken des Strassburger Münsters), a cantata by Liszt
