= Judge Bell =

Judge Bell may refer to:

- Griffin Bell (1918–2009), judge of the United States Court of Appeals for the Fifth Circuit
- J. Spencer Bell (1906–1967), judge of the United States Court of Appeals for the Fourth Circuit
- Kenneth D. Bell (born 1958), judge of the United States District Court for the Western District of North Carolina
- Robert C. Bell (1880–1964), judge of the United States District Court for the District of Minnesota
- Robert Holmes Bell (1944–2023), judge of the United States District Court for the Western District of Michigan
- Sam H. Bell (1925–2010), judge of the United States District Court for the Northern District of Ohio

== See also ==
- Justice Bell (disambiguation)
