= Glock (disambiguation) =

Glock is a line of pistols manufactured by Glock Ges.m.b.H.

Glock may also refer to:

- Glock GmbH, an Austrian weapons manufacturer
  - Glock knife
- Niersteiner Glöck, Germany's oldest vine denomination

== People with the surname ==
- Charles Y. Glock (1919–2018), American sociologist
- Gaston Glock (1929–2023), Austrian weapons designer
- Timo Glock (born 1982), Formula One driver
- William Glock (1908–2000), British musical administrator

== See also ==
- Gloc-9 (born 1977), Filipino rapper
- 9lokkNine (born 2000), American rapper
- G-LOC, g-force induced loss of consciousness
- Glockenspiel, a musical instrument
- Die Glocke (disambiguation)
