= Badgerys Creek (watercourse) =

Coordinates: 33°51′S 150°45′E

- Etymology: In honour of James Badgery (1769-1827)

Location
- Country: Australia
- State: New South Wales
- Region: Sydney basin (IBRA), Greater Western Sydney
- Local government areas: Camden, Liverpool, Penrith, Blacktown, Hawkesbury

Physical characteristics
- Source
  - location: near Bringelly
- Mouth: confluence with South Creek
  - location: Badgerys Creek
- Length: 16 km (9.9 mi)

Basin features
- River system: Hawkesbury-Nepean catchment

Badgerys Creek, a watercourse that is part of the Hawkesbury-Nepean catchment, is located in Greater Western Sydney, New South Wales, Australia.

== Course and features ==
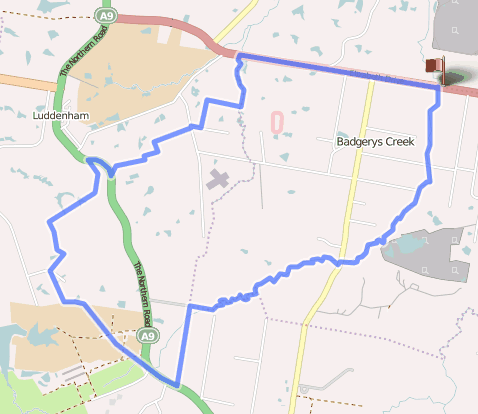

Badgerys Creek rises in Sydney's south western suburbs about 4 kilometres (2.5 mi) west of Bringelly and flows generally north then north-east before reaching its confluence with South Creek, in the suburb of Badgerys Creek. The creek descends 94 metres (308 ft) over its 16 kilometres (9.9 mi) course.

== Etymology ==
Badgerys Creek is named after James Badgery who received a grant of 640 acres (260 ha) in 1812. Badgery (1769–1827) had arrived in the colony in November 1799 as an emigrant in the employ of William Paterson of the New South Wales Corps. In 1803, Badgery obtained a grant of 100 acres (40 ha) at Agnes Banks in the area of Yarramundi Lagoon and an additional 39 acres (16 ha) was granted the following year. However it was this large grant of 640 acres (260 ha) that Badgery used to establish a farming enterprise which included property in the Sutton Forest region and evolved over the nineteenth century into the agricultural company Pitt Son & Badgery. Badgery named the grant Exeter Farm after his English birthplace. By 1828 the Badgery family had 1,900 acres (770 ha) of land in the colony. Essentially rural and sparsely populated throughout the nineteenth century, local government representation was forced on the area by the New South Wales Government in 1906 through the establishment of Nepean Shire. In the early 1920s, Badgery's old grant was divided under the provisions of the Soldier Settlement Act, while in 1936 a large area with frontage to South Creek was acquired by the Commonwealth of Australia for a CSIRO research station for animal health (McMaster's Field Station) and also for a short time was a field station for research into radio astronomy. The site was sold by the CSIRO in 1996.

== See also ==
- Rivers of New South Wales
- Second Sydney Airport
