= Belis =

Belis may refer to:

- Belize, a country in Central America
- Bélis, a commune in Landes department, France
- Beliș, a commune in Cluj County, Romania
- Beliș (river), a tributary of the river Someșul Cald in Cluj County, Romania

== See also ==
- Bells (disambiguation)
