= Justice Bell =

Justice Bell or Judge Bell, may refer to:

== People ==
Judges named Bell include:

- Bennett Douglas Bell (1852–1934), associate justice of the Tennessee Supreme Court
- Charles S. Bell (1880–1965), associate justice of the Supreme Court of Ohio
- James F. Bell (judge) (1915–2005), associate justice of the Supreme Court of Ohio
- James H. Bell (1825–1892), associate justice of the Texas Supreme Court
- John C. Bell Jr. (1892–1974), associate justice and chief justice of the Pennsylvania Supreme Court
- Kenneth B. Bell, associate justice of the Florida Supreme Court
- Richard Bell (Georgia judge) (1920–2005), associate justice of the Supreme Court of Georgia
- R. C. Bell (judge) (1880–1962), associate justice of the Supreme Court of Georgia
- Robert M. Bell (born 1943), judge of the Maryland Court of Appeals
- Samuel Dana Bell (1798–1868), chief justice of the New Hampshire Supreme Court
- Virginia Bell (judge) (born 1951), justice of the High Court of Australia

== Other uses ==
- Justice Bell (Valley Forge), Pennsylvania, USA; a replica of the Liberty Bell used to campaign for women's suffrage

== See also ==
- Bell (surname)
- Judge Bell (disambiguation)
- Bell (disambiguation)
