= Drum Tower of Xi'an =

Historical tower in Xi'an, China

- 西安鼓楼
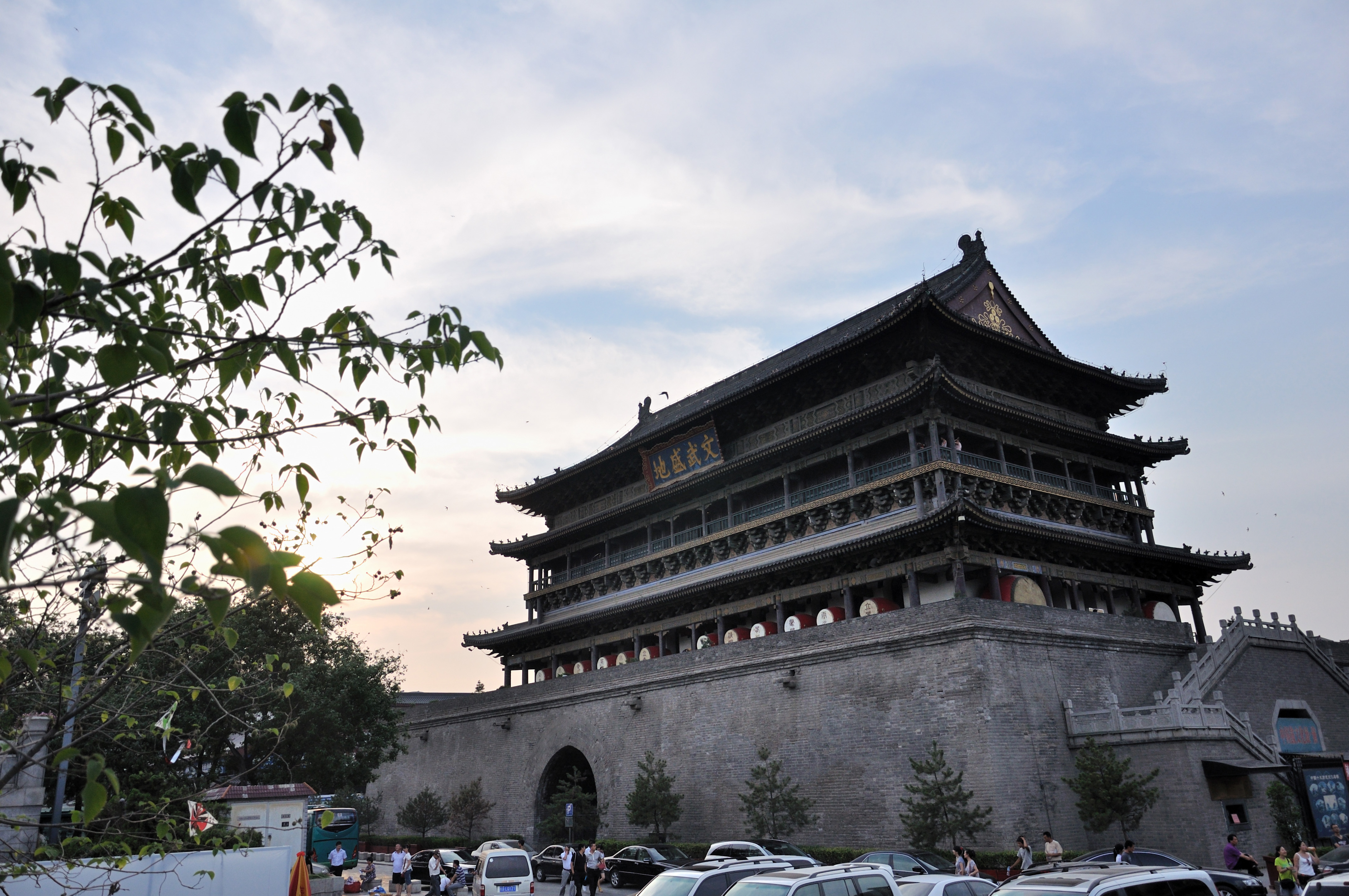
- Drum Tower with the plaque Wenwu Shengdi (Chinese: 文武盛地, a place of prosperous literary and military)
- Interactive map of the Drum Tower of Xi'an area

General information
- Location: Xi'an, Shaanxi, China
- Coordinates: 34°15′42″N 108°56′19″E
- Completed: 1380

The Drum Tower of Xi'an (Chinese: 西安鼓楼), located in the heart of Xi'an, the capital of Shaanxi province, Northwestern China, along with the Bell Tower is a symbol of the city. Erected in 1380 during the early Ming Dynasty (Hongwu era), it stands towering above the city center and offers an incredible view of Xi'an. The Drum Tower is in a predominantly Muslim district of Xi'an, known as the Drum Tower Muslim District (DTMD).

The Drum Tower got its name from the huge drum located within the building. For centuries, the Drum Tower has worked in conjunction with the Bell Tower to announce the time, with the bells signifying morning and the drums signifying evening.

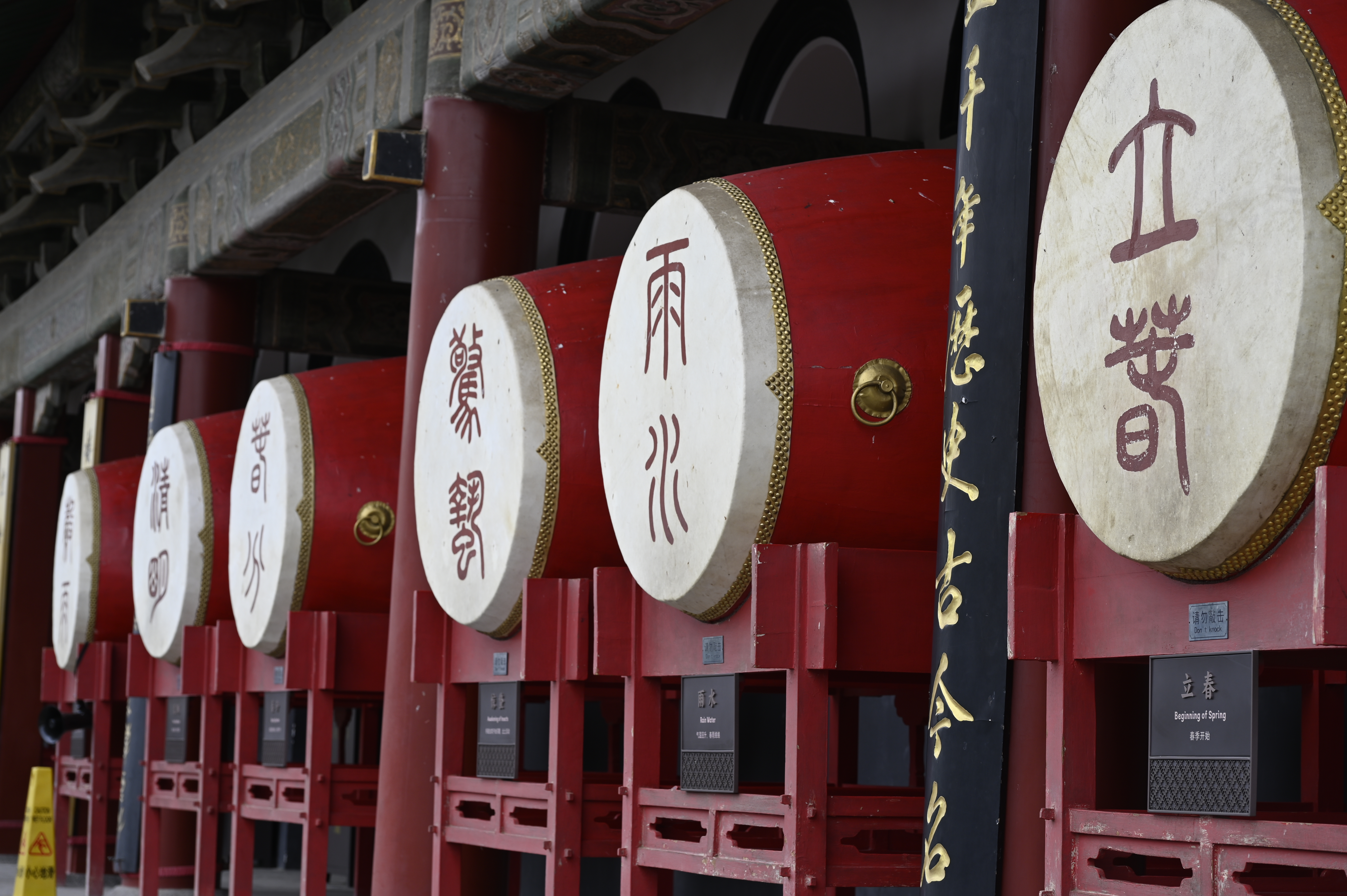
Outward-facing small Drums from the Tower, with Traditional Chinese inscriptions for Each Solar Term

== Drums ==
On the outer terrace of the first floor of the tower, there are 24 "small" drums on the North and South sides of the tower. These drums are inscribed with Traditional Chinese characters for the 24 Solar Terms of the traditional Chinese lunisolar calendar Besides these drums, the Hall also houses the so-called Wentian Drum (north side) made in 1996, claimed then as the largest cowhide drum in the world. These drums are played as part of a daily bell and drum symphony.

== Gallery ==
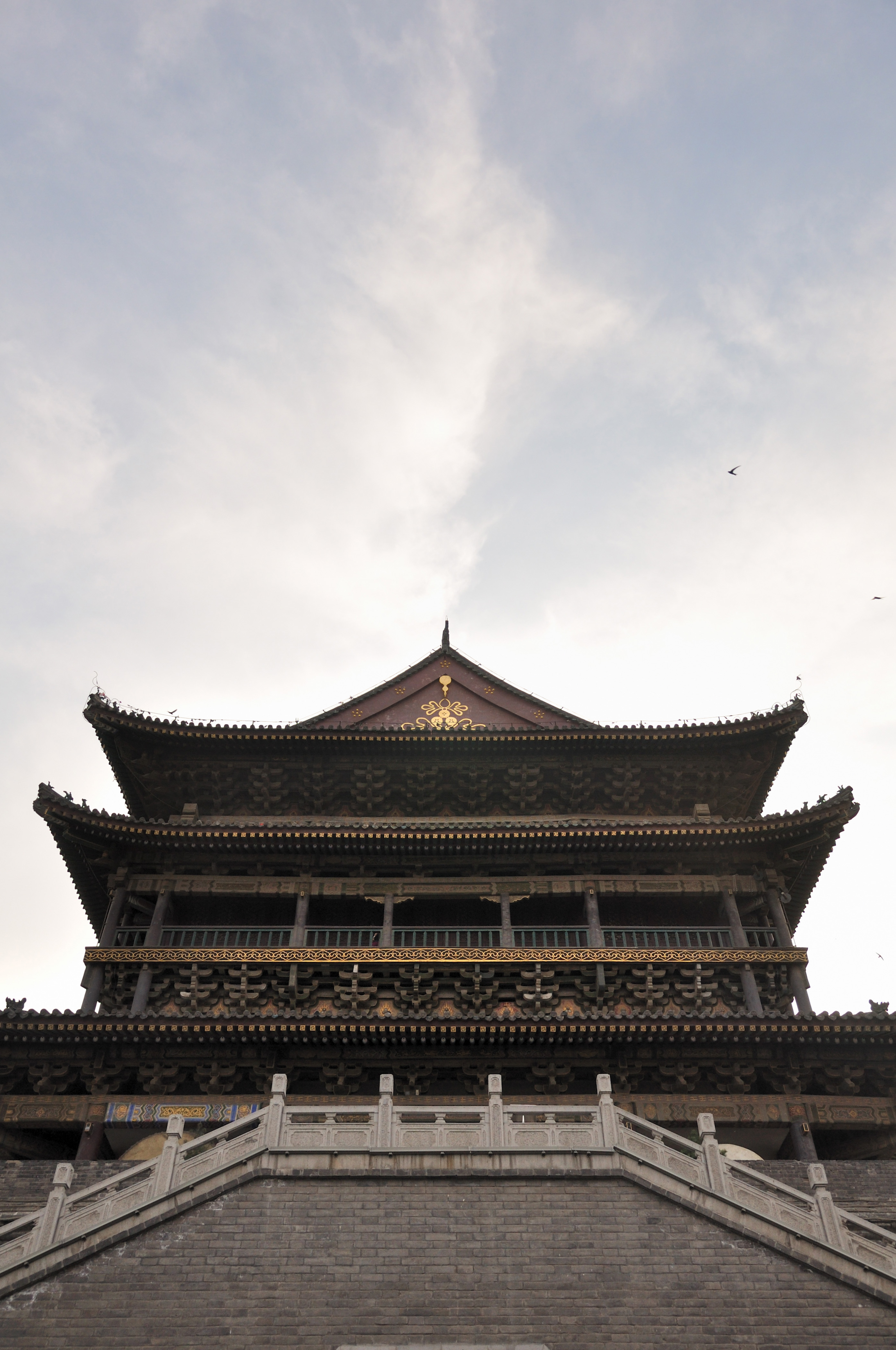
Drum Tower from east

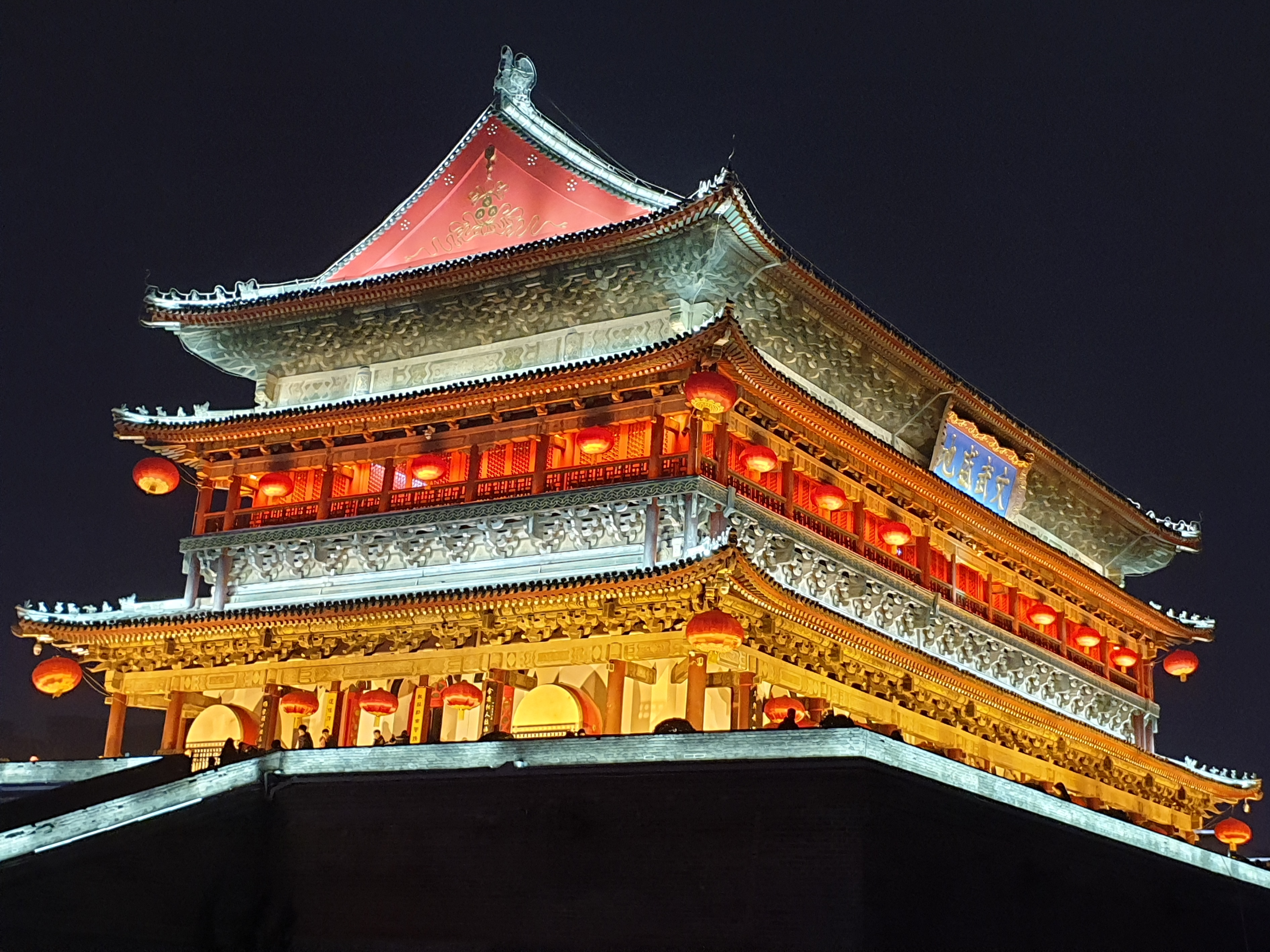
Drum Tower in night

== See also ==
- Bell Tower of Xi'an
- Giant Wild Goose Pagoda, another main symbol of Xi'an
- Drum Tower of Nanjing, a tower also built in Hongwu era
