= Old Bell =

The Old Bell or Olde Bell may refer to:

- Old Bell, Fleet Street, London, England, a 17th-century pub
- The Old Bell, Covent Garden, London, England, a pub built in 1835
- The Old Bell, Hemel Hempstead, England, an 18th-century pub built on the site of a 1603 inn
- The Old Bell, Henley on Thames, England, a pub established in 1325
- The Old Bell, Malmesbury, England, a hotel and restaurant established in 1220
- The Old Bell Hotel, Derby, England, established in 1650
- The Old Bell Museum, Montgomery, Wales, a former 16th-century inn
- The Olde Bell, Hurley, England, a hotel and pub established in 1135
- The Olde Bell, Rye, England, an inn established in 1390

== See also ==
- Bell (disambiguation)
- Bell Hotel (disambiguation)
- Old Bell Telephone Building (Osceola, Arkansas), U.S.
