= Bells Creek (Blacktown, New South Wales) =

Coordinates: 33°43′S 150°51′E

Bells

Location
- Country: Australia
- State: New South Wales
- Region: Sydney basin (IBRA), Greater Western Sydney
- Local government area: Blacktown

Physical characteristics
- Source
  - location: Rooty Hill
- Mouth: confluence with Eastern Creek
  - location: near Marsden Park
- Length: 9 km (5.6 mi)
- Basin size: 13.8 km^{2} (5.3 sq mi)

Basin features
- River system: Hawkesbury-Nepean catchment

Bells Creek, an urban watercourse that is part of the Hawkesbury-Nepean catchment, is located in Greater Western Sydney, New South Wales, Australia.

== Course and features ==
Bells Creek rises in the western suburbs of Sydney about 1 kilometre (0.62 mi) west by south of the Woodstock trigonometry station in Rooty Hill, and flows generally north by east before reaching its confluence with Eastern Creek, east of the suburb of Marsden Park. The course of the creek is approximately 9 kilometres (5.6 mi).

In 2005, the Bells Creek catchment area was rated the fourteenth-highest polluting catchment out of the twenty-two catchments in the Blacktown local government area. Bells Creek catchment can be split into two defined halves. The northern half of the catchment consists of predominantly semi-rural and light industry whilst the southern catchment is older residential. There are areas of intact creek with high ecological values in the lower catchment and it is important to protect them through upper catchment works. The residential areas are high exporters of sediment and within the upper catchment it was estimated in 2005 that in excess of 300 tonnes (47,000 st) of sediment were being exported per annum. The catchment also contains areas of remnant vegetation that form vital corridors for native fauna. Due to the size and condition of these remnants, they form good habitat and important refuge areas. The creek south of Richmond Road is highly modified (piped) and has few remaining natural values. The creek forms a valuable function for flood mitigation. Downstream of Richmond Road the adjoining landholders have had severe impacts on the creek. There are blockages through the incorporation of weirs for irrigation and the construction of levee banks for limited flood protection. However, the channel still retains many natural features including canopy vegetation and in-stream habitat.

Evidence of early Aboriginal people has been found in several locations within the City of Blacktown, such as on the banks of the South Creek and its tributaries, including Eastern Creek.

Bells Creek is transversed by the Westlink M7 and the Richmond railway line at Quakers Hill.

== See also ==
- Rivers of New South Wales
