= Bells Creek (West Virginia) =

River in the United States of America

Coordinates: 38°14′14″N 81°11′09″W

Bells Creek is a stream in the U.S. state of West Virginia in Nicholas County.

Bells Creek was named for the how American Indians would ring cowbells in order to lure white settlers into a traps.

== See also ==
- List of rivers of West Virginia
