= Bell Public School =

Bell Independent School District

Location
- Stilwell, Oklahoma United States
- Coordinates: 35.7259°N 94.5766°W

District information
- Type: Public

The Bell Public School is a school based in Stilwell, Oklahoma in the United States. On May 27, 2010, the Oklahoma Board of Education revoked the district's accreditation.
