= Streamwatch =

Streamwatch may refer to:

- a school- and community-based environmentalism education and action program that raises awareness of the natural environment through testing water quality in local rivers and streams
  - StreamWatch, an example of such a program from Virginia, US
- the act of watching streaming video, especially in connection with reality television such as Big Brother
