= Die Glocke (magazine) =

German magazine

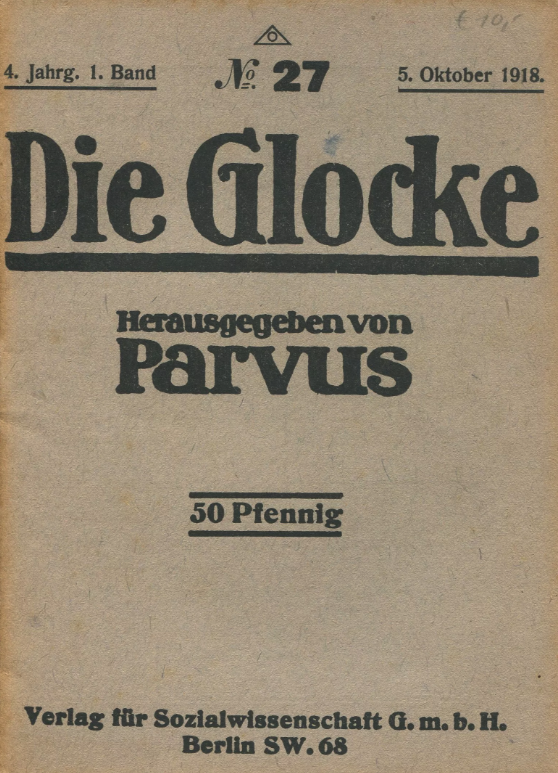
Die Glocke, No.27 published 5 October 1918

Die Glocke Sozialistische Wochenschrift was a political magazine established in 1915 by the maverick socialist Alexander Parvus to argue that socialists should support the German war effort. It attracted Marxist theoreticians who had previously been regarded as left-wing. It was published until 1925.

Die Glocke was originally published in Munich by the München Verlag Für Sozialwissenschaften. It was subsequently published in Berlin. The initial editor was Konrad Haenisch with Paul Lensch, Wilhelm Jansson and August Winnig on the permanent editorial team.

== Max Beer's editorship ==
Parvus invited Max Beer to become editor-in-chief in 1919, a position he held until February 1921. Beer attempted to change its content, dropping support for the Majority Social Democratic Party of Germany. The magazine included reviews of National Socialist pamphlets, which Beer excused on the grounds that the Party was not "prominently" antisemitic during that period. Beer experienced increasing tension with Parvus which came to a head after he published an article by Maxim Gorky and an article he had written himself about the ethics of Bolshevism. Beer resigned in February 1921.
