= Eastern Creek (New South Wales) =

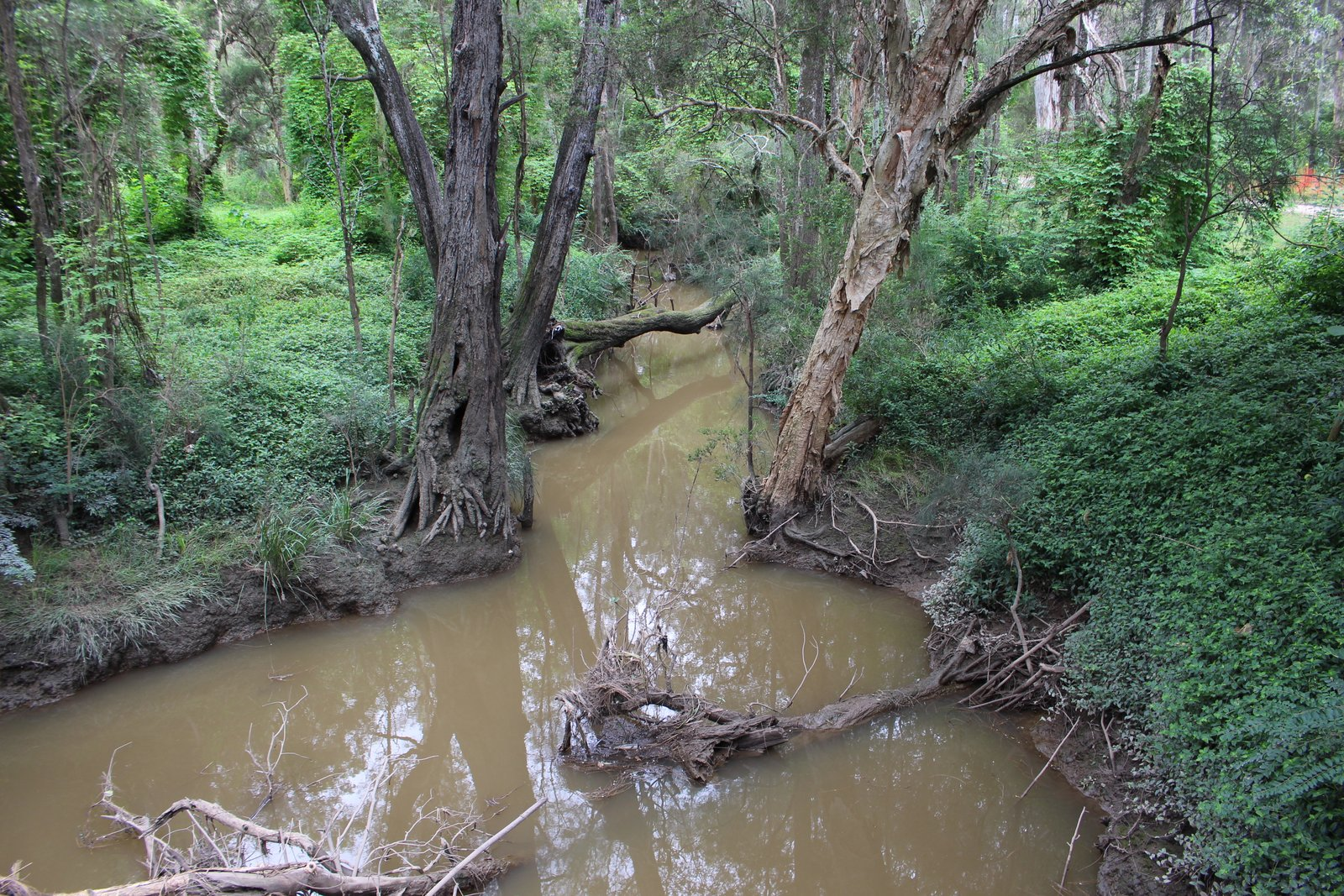
- at Nurragingy Reserve

Location
- Country: Australia
- State: New South Wales
- Region: Sydney basin (IBRA), Greater Western Sydney
- Local government areas: Cumberland, Fairfield, Blacktown

Physical characteristics
- Source: below Sugarloaf Ridge
  - location: near Smithfield
  - coordinates: 33°51′48″S 150°51′39″E
  - elevation: 116 m (381 ft)
- Mouth: confluence with South Creek
  - location: Vineyard
  - coordinates: 33°38′38″S 150°49′39″E
  - elevation: 3 m (9.8 ft)
- Length: 30 km (19 mi)
- Basin size: 36.22 km^{2} (13.98 sq mi)

Basin features
- River system: Hawkesbury-Nepean catchment
- Tributaries
  - left: Reedy Creek, Angus Creek, Bells Creek
  - right: Bungarribee Creek, Breakfast Creek, Burdekin Creek, Quakers Creek
- Nature reserve: Nurragingy Reserve

Eastern Creek, a watercourse that is part of the Hawkesbury-Nepean catchment, is located in Greater Western Sydney, New South Wales, Australia.

== Course and features ==
Eastern Creek rises in the western suburbs of Sydney, below Sugarloaf Ridge at Western Sydney Regional Park about 6 kilometres (3.7 mi) west by north of Smithfield. The creek flows generally north, joined by the Reedy, Angus, Bungarribee, Breakfast, Burdekin, Quakers, and Bells creeks, before reaching its confluence with South Creek, in the suburb of Vineyard. The creek descends 113 metres (371 ft) over its 30 kilometres (19 mi) course.

Eastern Creek is transversed by the M4 Western Motorway and the Great Western Highway between Prospect and Eastern Creek; and the Western railway line west of Doonside.

== See also ==
- Rivers of New South Wales
