= Bell Township, Pennsylvania =

Bell Township is the name of some places in the U.S. state of Pennsylvania:

- Bell Township, Clearfield County, Pennsylvania
- Bell Township, Jefferson County, Pennsylvania
- Bell Township, Westmoreland County, Pennsylvania

== See also ==
- Bell Township (disambiguation)
