= Bell Inn, Enfield =

Former pub in Enfield, London

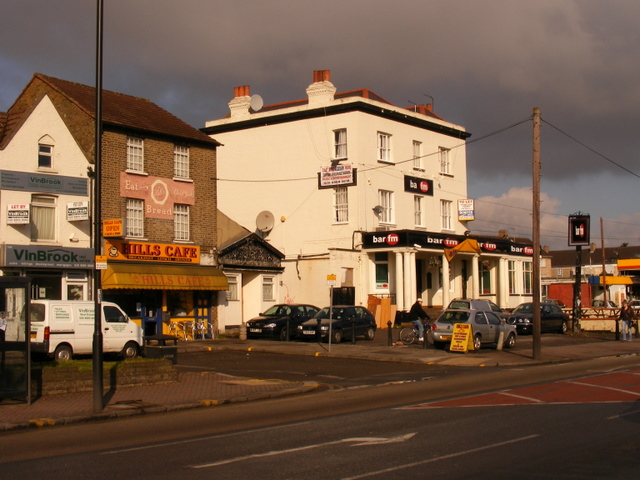
- The Bell, photographed in 2009.

- Location within London Borough of Enfield Location within Greater London

General information
- Location: Hertford Road, Enfield, London, England
- Coordinates: 51.6669°N 0.0430°W

Design and construction
- Designations

Listed Building – Grade II
- Official name: Bell Inn Public House
- Designated: 31 January 1974
- Reference no.: 1358709

The Bell Inn is a grade II listed former public house in Hertford Road, Enfield Wash, Enfield. The building dates from the second quarter of the 19th century. The facade has a projecting loggia with Roman Doric columns. It later operated under names including Bar FM, Chimes, the Texas Cantina and Club X Zone, and has since housed a Turkish restaurant.
