= Bell, South Africa =

Bell
- Location within Eastern Cape Location within South Africa
- Coordinates: 33.256°S 27.363°E
- Country: South Africa
- Province: Eastern Cape
- District: Amathole
- Municipality: Ngqushwa

Area
  - Total: 3.29 km^{2} (1.27 sq mi)

Population (2011)
  - Total: 865
  - Density: 263/km^{2} (681/sq mi)

Racial makeup (2011)
  - Black African: 99.7%
  - Indian/Asian: 0.1%
  - Other: 0.2%

First languages (2011)
  - Xhosa: 96.9%
  - English: 1.7%
  - Other: 1.4%
- Time zone: UTC+2 (SAST)
- Postal code (street): 5605

Bell is a village 30 km south-east of Peddie and 80 km south-west of East London. Named after Charles Davidson Bell (1813-1882), Surveyor-General in 1857.
