= Bell ID =

Bell Identification B.V.
- Trade name: Bell ID
- Company type: Private
- Industry: Software
- Predecessor: AND Identification B.V.
- Founded: 1993
- Fate: Acquired
- Successor: Visa Inc.
- Headquarters: Netherlands
- Products: Smart token management software
- Parent: Rambus (2016–2019)

Bell Identification B.V., or Bell ID, was a Dutch software company that developed smart token management software, including key management, smart card management, EMV data preparation, and host card emulation-based mobile payments software. Bell ID was acquired by Rambus in 2016 and in 2019, Visa Inc. acquired Bell ID from Rambus.

== History ==
Bell ID was formerly known as AND Identification B.V., and changed its name in 2000. The company was founded in 1993 to provide ID solutions for governments and enterprises in the Benelux region. In 2004, Bell ID became a privately held company, and established itself in the EMV smart card and mobile payments market. In 2012 Bell ID acquired Ecebs.

== Awards ==
In April 2014, Bell ID was awarded by Mondato with the European MFS Innovation of the Year Award and by Contactless Intelligence with a Contactless & Mobile Award in the ecosystem category for Secure Element in the Cloud. In June 2014, the same product received the NFCP award for the next big thing in proximity.
