= Bell, Book & Candle =

Bell, Book & Candle may refer to:

- Bell, book, and candle, an archaic procedure used for excommunication
- Bell, Book and Candle, a 1958 romantic comedy film
- Bell, Book & Candle (band), a German group
- Bell, Book and Candle (shop), a fictional shop in Good Witch (TV series)
- Bell, Book and Candle (play), a play by John Van Druten, the basis for the film
