= South Creek (New South Wales) =

Creek in Sydney, Australia

South
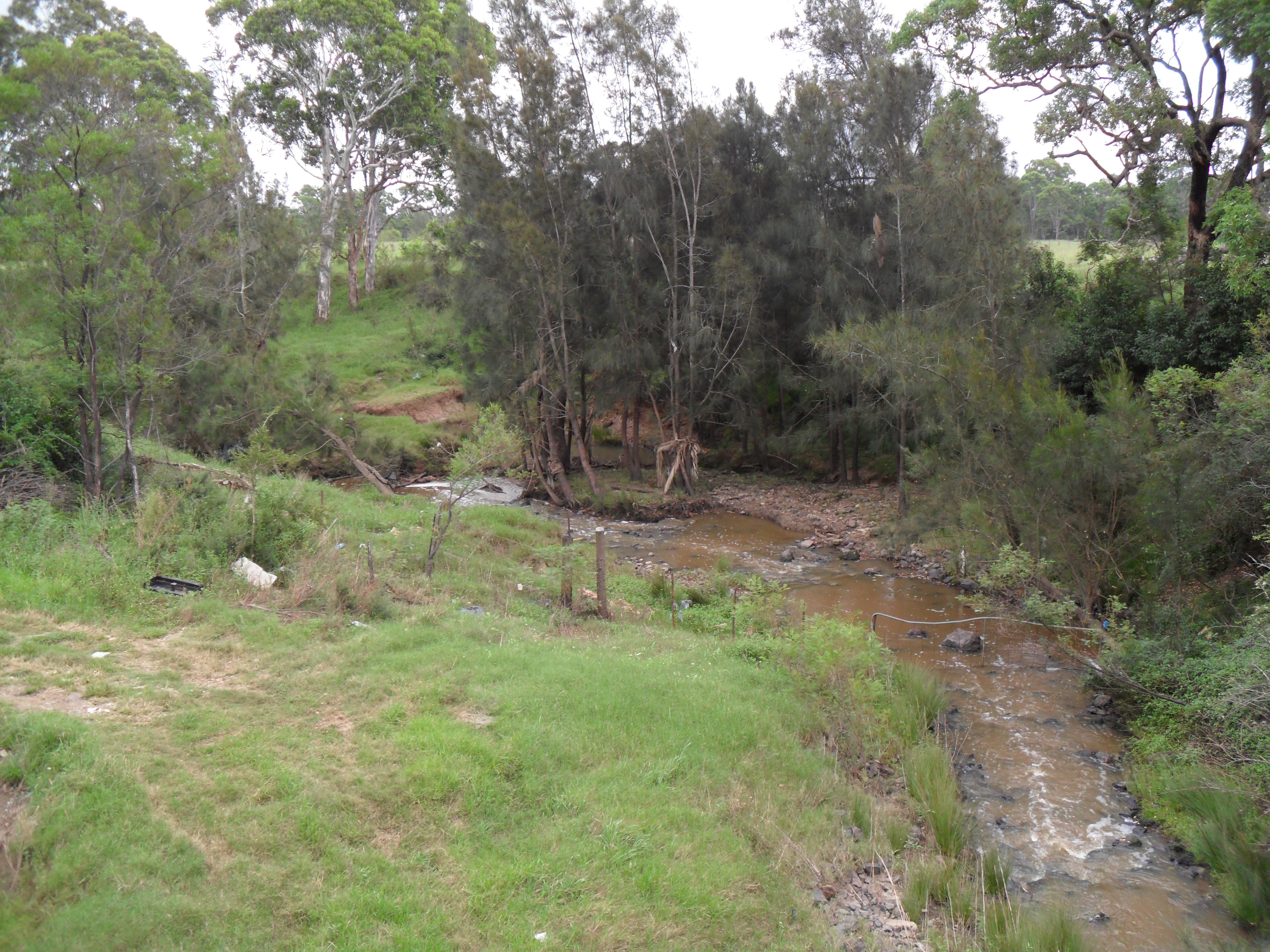
- Viewed from Luddenham Road, Orchard Hills, 2013.
- Etymology: Aboriginal Dharug: 'mother place'
- Native name: Wianamatta (Dharuk)

Location
- Country: Australia
- State: New South Wales
- Region: Sydney basin (IBRA), Greater Western Sydney
- Local government areas: Camden, Liverpool, Penrith, Blacktown, Hawkesbury

Physical characteristics
- Source: former Oran Park Raceway
  - location: Oran Park
  - coordinates: 34°01′12″S 150°46′34″E
  - elevation: 97 m (318 ft)
- Mouth: confluence with the Hawkesbury River
  - location: near Windsor
  - coordinates: 33°35′56″S 150°50′00″E
  - elevation: 2 m (6 ft 7 in)
- Length: 70 km (43 mi)

Basin features
- River system: Hawkesbury-Nepean catchment
- Tributaries
  - left: Badgerys Creek, Ropes Creek
  - right: Kemps Creek, Eastern Creek

The South Creek or Wianamatta is a creek that is part of the Hawkesbury-Nepean catchment, located on the Cumberland Plain in Greater Western Sydney, New South Wales, Australia.

== Course and features ==
The creek rises in Sydney's south western suburbs below the former Oran Park Raceway about 4 kilometres (2.5 mi) north-east of Narellan and 7 kilometres (4.3 mi) west of Minto. In its upper catchment, the creek forms the boundary between the suburbs of Oran Park and Catherine Field. The creek flows generally north, joined by seventeen tributaries including Badgerys Creek, Kemps Creek, Ropes Creek and Eastern Creek, until reaching its confluence with the Hawkesbury River, near Windsor. The creek descends 94 metres (308 ft) over its 70 kilometres (43 mi) course.

The creek also contains many fish such as GYANU fish Common Carp, Catfish (some areas only), Australian bass, and metre long eels

From source to mouth, the creek flows through or forms the boundary of the suburbs of Bringelly, Rossmore, Badgerys Creek, Kemps Creek, Claremont Meadows, Orchard Hills, Werrington, St Marys, Werrington County, Dunheved, Llandilo, Shanes Park, Berkshire Park, Windsor Downs, Riverstone, Vineyard, Mulgrave, Windsor, McGraths Hill and Pitt Town Bottoms.

=== Tributaries ===
The South Creek or Wianamatta is joined by Lowes Creek and Rileys Creek at Bringelly; by Thompsons Creek at Rossmore; by Badgerys Creek and by Kemps Creek at the suburb of Badgerys Creek; by Cosgrove Creek at Luddenham; by Blaxland Creek at Orchard Hills; by Byrnes Creek at St Marys; by Claremont Creek at Werrington; by Werrington Creek at Werrington County; by three unnamed creeks at Llandilo, Marsden Park, and Riverstone; by Ropes Creek at Shanes Park; by Eastern Creek at Vineyard; by McGraths Hill Wetlands and by McKenzies Creek at McGraths Hill.

== Etymology ==
Wianamatta is an Aboriginal word of the Dharug language, meaning 'mother place'. Evidence of early Aboriginal people has been found in several locations within the Blacktown Local government area. Shell middens from the Darug people have been found near the sewage treatment plant on Breakfast Creek and South Creek.

South Creek was dual-named as Wianamatta on 28 March 2003 by the Geographical Names Board of New South Wales (GNB).

It was dual-named after a submission that the name be changed. However, a lengthy investigation followed, and after consultation with local Aboriginal Land Councils it was decided after extensive workshops carried by the GNB, that instead, a dual-naming proposal should be pursued instead. Following that decision, the GNB carried out an extensive consultation throughout the entire state of NSW, contacting all Aboriginal land councils on record as well as placing entries in every prominent and regional newspaper explaining the proposal and inviting comments.

== History ==
After James Ruse sold his Experiment Farm at Parramatta, in January 1794 he obtained a grant of land at the junction of the Hawkesbury and South Creek (which for a time was known as Ruse's Creek).

A township of South Creek used to exist near St Marys. The name only existed for a few years in the early settlement of New South Wales and now it is part of St Marys/Dunheved. One of its pioneer settlers was Thomas Jamison (1753–1811) who arrived with the First Fleet and became Surgeon-General of New South Wales in 1801. Jamisontown in the Penrith area is also named after him.

== See also ==
- 1813 crossing of the Blue Mountains
- St Clair
- Rivers of New South Wales
