= Bell station =

Bell station may refer to:

- Bell station (Houston), Texas, U.S.
- Bell station (TRE), Fort Worth, Texas, U.S.
- Bell railway station, New South Wales, Australia
- Bell railway station, Melbourne, Victoria, Australia
- Bell Station, California, U.S., an unincorporated community
- Bell Station, a former name of Zinfandel, California, U.S.
