= Bell Cox =

Michael Bell Cox (11 October 1826 – 26 July 1897) was an Anglican priest in Ireland during the Nineteenth Century.

Cox was educated at Trinity College, Dublin. He was ordained in 1851. He became the incumbent at Glenties in 1856; and was Archdeacon of Raphoe from 1877 until July 1897. He was then appointed Dean of Raphoe in the Province of Armagh in the Church of Ireland but died before consecration at age 70.
