= Service bell =

Service bell may refer to:

- Call bell, a countertop bell used to summon an attendant to a service desk
- Servant bell, a bell used to call the attention of an in-house servant
