= Bell Lake =

Bell Lake may refer to:

- Bell Lake, Manitoba, Canada; a lake in Bell Lake Provincial Park
- Bell Lake Provincial Park, Manitoba, Canada
- Bell Lake, Ontario, Canada; any of several lakes, see List of lakes of Ontario: B
- Bell Lake, Halifax Regional Municipality, Nova Scotia, Canada; either of two lakes, see List of lakes of Nova Scotia

== See also ==
- Belle Lake (Nova Scotia), Canada; a lake on Cape Breton
- Belle Lake, Minnesota, USA; a lake
- Lake-Bell House, Washington County, Arkansas, USA; a historic building
- Lake Bell (born 1979), American film director
