= Hotel Bell (Alva, Oklahoma) =

- U.S. National Register of Historic Places
- Location within Oklahoma
- Location: 505 Barnes, Alva, Oklahoma
- Coordinates: 36°48′13″N 98°39′56″W
- Area: less than one acre
- Built: 1927
- Architectural style: Classical Revival
- NRHP reference No.: 13000395
- Added to NRHP: June 14, 2013

The Hotel Bell in Alva, Oklahoma was built in 1927. It was listed on the National Register of Historic Places in 2013.

It is a six-story three-part vertical building with frame of reinforced concrete and with floors and walls of hollow clay tiles and brick. It is a late 19th century Classical Revival. It has been the tallest building in northwestern Oklahoma. The hotel shut down in the early 1960s.

John and Amy Ryerson of Starr Lumber bought the building from Charles Ramy and Leland Steffen in 2002. An extensive renovation was completed in 2017 and it was reopened, after being closed for four decades.
