= West Avenue (Xi'an) =

Road in Xi'an, Shaanxi, China

West Avenue (Chinese: 西大街; pinyin: Xīdàjiē) in Chinese phonetic) is one of the most important streets in the city of Xi’an (a historical city in the middle of China). It has 400 years of history since the Ming Dynasty as a famous commercial street. The avenue starts at Bell Tower which is the core of the city and ends at West Gate (Chinese: 西门; pinyin: Xīmén).

== Origin ==
The status that West Avenue has attributes greatly to a temple that cohered to the street. The name of the temple is called City God Temple.

City God Temple hosts the most important god that protects the city, so this temple has had most influence on ordinary people. It became an important meeting place for religion, commercial and public affairs even 400 years ago. West Avenue benefits from this temple ever since its birth.

== Development ==
After the founding of People’s Republic of China in 1949, West Avenue had kept its dominance status for almost 30 years. The City God Temple was actually occupied by small merchants and focal handcraft artists, and then a market was shaped spontaneously just in front of the temple. People from other parts of the city and even remote countries and villages came to this market. Then commercial spread out in West Avenue. It had the first department store “Jianhua Department Store” of this city, and many traditional famous-brand stores.

== Decline ==
But when a free market policy was carried out in 1980s, commercial feature of West Avenue was challenge by other districts and streets. Actually there are 4 major avenues indicating 4 directions in central Xi’an city. West Avenue leads to the industrial quarter of the city, South to the education and technology, North has provincial offices as perimeter, East connects to another important street in the city. When the-once-state-owed factories in the west were frustrated in a more open market in the 1980s and 1990s, the economy of that area was also fluctuated. So West Avenue with its stores was far behind others. Its road was narrow, houses were old.

== Revitalization ==
In 2006, with the reconstruction of “Tablet Gate” of City God Temple, the widening and reconstruction project of West Avenue came to an end. Giant shopping malls with ancient Chinese style replace the shabby, tiny stores. City officials have a grand ambitious to revitalize this street that can attract more tourists, attribute to the city’s financial and provide more jobs.

However, the nature pattern of the city that accumulated in hundreds of years is wiped out in this area. Exaggerated ancient-style buildings decorate this street now. Maybe that can inspire citizens and commercials, but you can also find a more friendly and amiable environment just in the back streets that connects to West Avenue.
