= The Bell Inn, Long Hanborough =

Historic pub and restaurant in Oxfordshire, England

Coordinates: 51.825°N 1.386°W

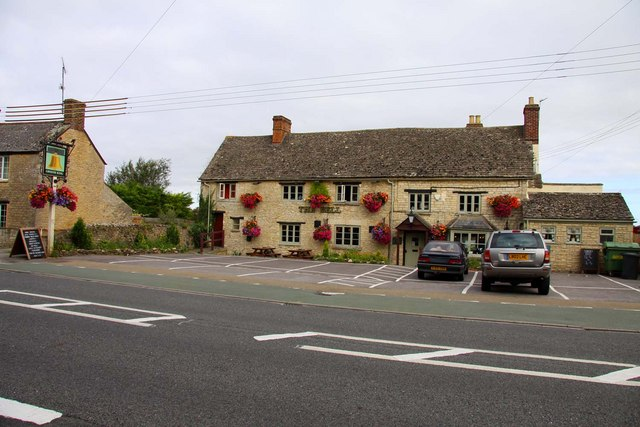
The Bell in August 2009

The Bell Inn, Long Hanborough is a former restaurant and public house in the village of Long Hanborough, Oxfordshire, England.

The Bell borders the grounds of Blenheim Palace, Woodstock where Sir Winston Churchill was born. It is approximately 5 miles (8 km) from Witney. It was renovated in 2008, providing an open-plan interior with bar and restaurant. Outside, there are views over the Evenlode Valley.

The pub featured in a food riot by women at the turn of the 19th century.

The pub closed in 2013 and has since been converted for residential use.

It has been a Grade II listed building since 1988. Parts of the building date from the seventeenth century, but it has been extended and modified subsequently.
