= Bell Creek (Gasconade River tributary) =

Stream in the U.S. state of Missouri

Coordinates: 37°54′56″N 92°10′18″W

Bell Creek (also called Bells Creek) is a stream in Pulaski County in the U.S. state of Missouri. It is a tributary of the Gasconade River.

The stream headwaters arise on the east side of Crocker adjacent to Missouri Route 17 at . The stream flows east and southeast to its confluence with the Gasconade just north of Wheelers Mill at .

Bell Creek has the name of the local Bell family.

== See also ==
- List of rivers of Missouri
