= Bell Yu Tian =

Malaysian singer-songwriter and music producer

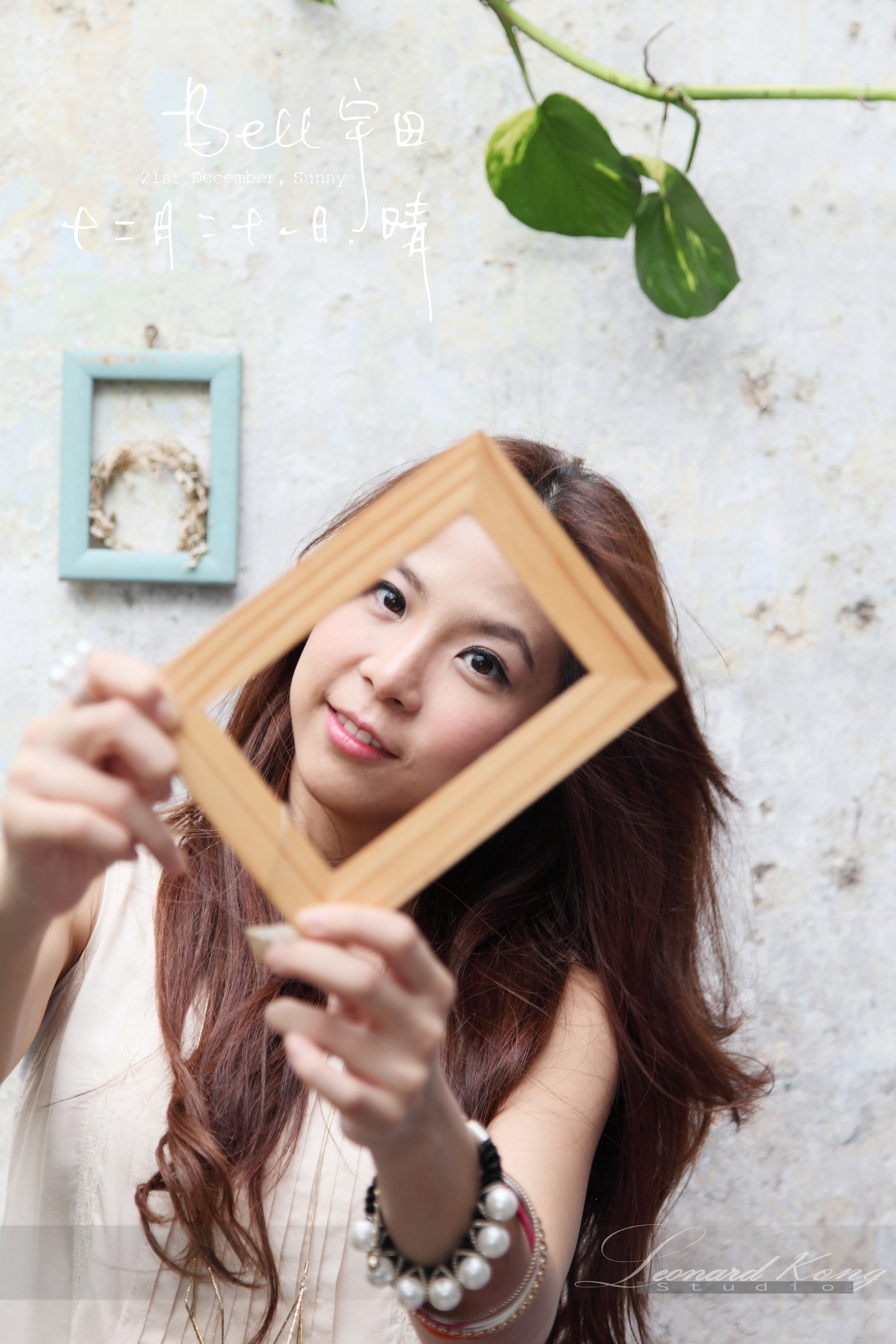
- Born: Melaka, Malaysia
- Occupations: Singer, songwriter
- Years active: 2012–present
- Website: Bell宇田 on Facebook

Bell Yu Tian is a Malaysian singer-songwriter and music producer from Malacca.

== Career ==
Bell Yu Tian is a songwriter and singer from Malaysia. She started her career in the entertainment industry in 2012 with her own composition titled Bring Me Away for the film Paper Moon. She not only sang the song, she was also the composer, producer, back up vocal, song arranger and pianist. Her songs and album topped the chart in Malaysia and she won numerous awards as the best new coming artiste in Malaysia. She also represented Malaysia in 2014 in Hong Kong for the Asian Pop Music Festival and won the best performer award. In 2012, she released the album Sunny and subsequently has released a number of singles as well as film compositions.

=== Album ===
Album Info	Release Date	Song List
Sunny	21 December 2012	Songlist: 1. Swetness In The Rain; 2. 21st December, Sunny; 3. Faded Away; 4. Miss You Dearly; 5. Softly & Tenderly; 6. Take Me Away; PaperMoon Movie Theme Song; 1. Tale Of The Red Beans; 2. My World; 3. I Honestly Love You; 4. Beautiful

=== Singles ===
Title	Release Date
Ji De Ni Shuo Guo	Dec 2013
ATM (ATM Movie Theme Song)	Feb 2015
My Little World (The Kid from the Big Apple - Movie Theme Song)	July 2015
Tadpole	April 2017
Before We Forget - Bell Yu Tian & JK (The Kid from the Big Apple 2 Before We Forget - Movie Theme Song)	June 2017

== Awards ==
Year	Music Awards	Category
2013	AIM Chinese Music Awards Malaysia	Best New Artiste - Gold
2013	MY ASTRO Music Awards	Take Me Away – Best Movie Theme Song
2013	MY ASTRO Music Awards	Sweetness In The Rain – Best Song
2013	Neway Karaoke Awards	Top 10 Most Popular Karaoke Songs - Sweetness In The Rain
2013	Neway Karaoke Awards	Most Popular Newcomer - Gold
2013	Neway Karaoke Awards	Best Female Singer Song Writer
2014	Global Chinese Golden Chart	MY FM Top Song of The Year - Sweetness In The Rain
2014	Hong Kong Asian-Pop Music Festival	Best Vocal Performance
2015	PWH Music Awards Malaysia	Best New Artiste (Gold)
2015	PWH Music Awards Malaysia	Top 10 Local Hits - Sweetness In The Rain

=== Music scoring ===
Movie Title
Paper Moon
ATM
Who’s Your Daddy?
The Kid from the Big Apple
The Kid from the Big Apple 2 - Before We Forget
