= Bell High School =

Bell High School may refer to:

- Bell High School (Ottawa), Ontario, Canada
- Bell High School (California), United States
- Bell Middle/High School (Florida), United States

== See also ==
- Bell County High School, Pineville, Kentucky, United States
- L. D. Bell High School, Hurst, Texas, United States
