= Bell Elliott Palmer =

American writer

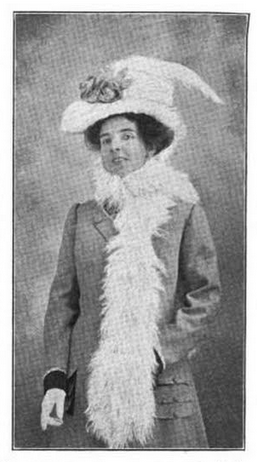
Bell Elliott Palmer, from a 1916 publication.

Bell Elliott Palmer (March 27, 1873 – October 2, 1947) was an American writer.

== Early life ==
Bell Elliott was born in Jacksonville, Illinois, the daughter of Richard Douglas Elliott (1848-1878) and Lucy H. Twyman Elliott (died 1878). She was raised by her grandparents after becoming an orphan as a small girl. She attended the University of Chicago.

== Career ==
Bell Elliott Palmer wrote dozens of plays, mostly one-act comedies, "clean and suitable for church, school, or dramatic clubs". Her titles included The Professor's Truant Gloves (1906), The Point of View (1906), Out of Town (1906), Mrs. Santa Claus, Militant (1914), The Love Flower (1921), What Can We Do with Aunt Sally? (1922), In the Garden of Life (1924), Fighting it Out at the Cheer Club (1924), Setting the Nation Right (1924), Not So Turribul (1925), It Can't Be Done (1925), Rest a Bit, Mother (1925), What's the Use! (1926), The Meddlesome Mrs. Mars (1929), We Never Gossip (1932), The Very Idea (1932), Fidgets (1932). Other titles, advertised in 1912, were His Uncle's Choice, or Dodging an Heiress, The Bluners from Blue Ridge, Aunt Billie From Texas, The Home of Confusion, Tilton, the Uplifter, Bob Upsets the Calendar, and They Do Say. Her Blessed Boy was added to the list by 1919.

Palmer published an epistolary novel, The Single-Code Girl (1915). She also wrote short stories, and articles for Out West and other periodicals.

== Personal life ==
Bell Elliott married James Allerton Palmer, a banker. They had three daughters. In 1916 she planned a long-distance walk with two of her daughters, from Los Angeles to Chicago. Palmer died in 1947, in Jacksonville, Illinois, survived by her daughters Anna Capps and Bell Voss. Her son-in-law was the artist Charles Merrick Capps.
