= Bell Tower Hotel =

Hotel in Xi'an, China

- Interactive map of the Bell Tower Hotel area

General information
- Location: Beilin District, Xi'an, China
- Coordinates: 34.2600°N 108.9417°E
- Renovated: 2003

Other information
- Number of rooms: 321

Bell Tower Hotel is a 4-star hotel in Xi'an, China. It located right in the heart of the city, opposite the well known Bell Tower and the newly built Bell & Drum Tower Square. One can find many historical sites within walking distance from the hotel.

== History ==
Bell Tower, originally built in the 17th year of Hongwu reign in the Ming dynasty with more than 600 years' history, stands in the center of Ancient Xi'an City. Jingyun Bell was originally cast in the 2nd year of Jingyun reign of Emperor Taizong in Tang dynasty; it is 2 m (6.6 ft) high with a diameter of 1.5 m (4.9 ft) and weighs about 5,000 kg (11,000 lb). The flying crane and twisting dragon are engraved on the surface of the bell and the bell's sound can reach more than 10 miles, which not only reflects hundreds of years' history but also deserves to be the symbol of Xi'an. According to the old legend, the hotel named Bell Tower Hotel.

== Rewards ==
The Bell Tower Hotel is prized as the "Golden Key Service Diamond Award" and honor title of the "Sincere Service Team Cooperation Award" granted by the Golden Key Hotels of the World.

== See also ==
- Terracotta Army
- Xi'an Incident
