= Glockenspiel (disambiguation) =

A glockenspiel is a percussion instrument consisting of pitched aluminum or steel bars.

Glockenspiel may also refer to:

- Keyboard glockenspiel, a glockenspiel operated by a keyboard mechanism
- Carillon, an instrument consisting of at least 23 cast bronze cup-shaped bells known in German as a Glockenspiel
- "Das Glockenspiel", a single from the Schiller debut album, Zeitgeist
- Bunnock, a game commonly referred to as glockenspiel

== See also ==
- Mt. Angel Glockenspiel, a building in Mt. Angel, Oregon
- Glockenspiel House, a building in Bremen, Germany, named after its carillon
- Rathaus-Glockenspiel, a clock in Marienplatz, Munich, Germany
