= Bell House =

Bell House or Bellhouse may refer to:

== Places ==
=== Canada ===
- Bell House (1910), a notable residence in Nutana, Saskatoon, Saskatchewan, Canada
- Bellhouse Provincial Park, British Columbia

=== Ireland ===
- Bell House (Ireland), part of Cambridge House Grammar School's house system named after musician Derek Bell

=== United Kingdom ===
- Bell House Gallery, Buntingford, England
- Bell House, Coxwold, almshouse in North Yorkshire
- Bell House, Dulwich, England
- Ramsden Bellhouse, a village in Essex
- Bell House Common, Hanworth, Norfolk, England
- Bell House, Milton of Campsie, Stirlingshire, Scotland, a Prospect 100 best modern Scottish building
- Bell houses, houses of George Bell

=== United States ===
- Willie Bell House, Mason's Bend, Alabama, a Rural Studio project
- Bell House (Prattville, Alabama)
- Bell House (Jonesboro, Arkansas)
- Lake-Bell House, Prairie Grove, Arkansas
- Bell House (Searcy, Arkansas)
- James George Bell House, a National Register of Historic Places listing in Los Angeles County, California
- Bell Farmhouse, Newark, Delaware
- R. H. and Jessie Bell House, a National Register of Historic Places listing in Ada County, Idaho
- Alvin Bushnell Bell House, Ida Grove, Iowa
- Foster/Bell House, Ottumwa, Iowa
- Hill McClelland Bell House, Des Moines, Iowa
- George and Annie Bell House, a National Register of Historic Places listings in Douglas County, Kansas
- Bell House (Edmonton, Kentucky)
- John Bell House (Lexington, Kentucky)
- Page-Bell House, a National Register of Historic Places listings in Trimble County, Kentucky
- Bell-Varner House, Leitersburg, Maryland
- Bell-Spalding House, Ann Arbor, Michigan
- Bell House (Starkville, Mississippi), a National Register of Historic Places listing in Oktibbeha County, Mississippi
- M. Fred Bell Rental Cottage, Fulton, Missouri
- Brandon-Bell-Collier House, Fulton, Missouri
- Jasper Newton Bell House, a National Register of Historic Places listing in Lancaster County, Nebraska
- Mary E. Bell House, Center Moriches, New York
- The Bell House (New York City), a comedy/music venue in Brooklyn, New York
- Bell-Sherrod House, Enfield, North Carolina
- Bryan-Bell Farm, Pollocksville, North Carolina
- Bell House (Fredericktown, Ohio), a National Register of Historic Places listing in Knox County, Ohio
- Bell's First Home, a National Register of Historic Places listing in Highland County, Ohio
- Dr. James Bell House, Cleveland, Ohio
- John C. Bell House, Philadelphia, Pennsylvania
- Isaac Bell House, Newport, Rhode Island
- Allen-Bell House, a National Register of Historic Places listing in Bastrop County, Texas
- John Y. Bell House, a National Register of Historic Places listings in DeWitt County, Texas
- Rogers-Bell House, a National Register of Historic Places listing in Travis County, Texas
- Faires-Bell House, a National Register of Historic Places listing in Collin County, Texas
- Bell-Johnson House, a National Register of Historic Places listings in Cache County, Utah
- Bell House (Colonial Beach, Virginia)
- Howard-Bell-Feather House, Riner, Virginia
- Dr. Robert and Jessie Bell House, a National Register of Historic Places listing in Spokane County, Washington
- John and Margaret Bell House, Spring Prairie, Wisconsin

== Other uses ==
- Bellhouse (barque), a British barque
- Bellhouse (surname)

== See also ==
- John Bell House (disambiguation)
- Belhus (disambiguation)
- Bell Farm (disambiguation)
- Bell housing, auto part
- House v. Bell, 2006 United States Supreme Court case
