= John Bell House =

John Bell House may refer to

in the United States

(by state)

- John Bell House (Lexington, Kentucky), listed on the NRHP in Kentucky
- John C. Bell House, Philadelphia, PA, listed on the NRHP in Pennsylvania
- John Bell Farm, West Whiteland, PA, listed on the NRHP in Pennsylvania
- John Y. Bell House, Cuero, TX, listed on the NRHP in Texas
- John and Margaret Bell House, Spring Prairie, WI, listed on the NRHP in Wisconsin
