= Bellhouse (surname) =

Bellhouse is a locative surname that derives from Middle English bel-hous, Old English bell-hūs, or the place name Bell House. Notable people with the surname include:

- Brian Bellhouse (1937–2017), British academic, engineer, and entrepreneur
- David Bellhouse (1764–1840), English Victorian builder
- Ernest Bellhouse (1871–1920), English footballer
- Michael Bellhouse (born 1976), English cricketer
- Molly Blackburn, née Bellhouse (1930–1985), South African anti-Apartheid campaigner
- Richard Bellhouse (1825–1906), English cricketer, watercolourist, and architect
- Thomas Bellhouse (1818–1886), English cricketer

== See also ==
- Bell House (disambiguation)
