= Ponape =

Ponape may refer to:

- Pohnpei, an island in the Federated States of Micronesia
- Ponape (barque), a German sailing ship
