= Regina Elena =

Regina Elena (English: Queen Elena) may refer to

- Queen Elena of Italy (Italian: Regina Elena)
- The Premio Regina Elena, an Italian flat race for horses
- Regina Elena, an Italian barque launched in 1903
- Regina Elena, an Italian battleship launched in 1904.
- Queen Mother Elena of Romania
