= Bell Farm =

Bell Farm may refer to:

in Canada

- Bell Farm (Indian Head, Saskatchewan), an endangered Canadian Heritage site

in the United States

- Bell Farmhouse, Newark, Delaware
- Bell Ranch, New Mexico
- Bryan-Bell Farm, Pollocksville, North Carolina, listed on the NRHP in North Carolina
- Hiram Bell Farmstead, Columbiana, Ohio
- John Bell Farm, West Whiteland, Pennsylvania
- Marcus Sears Bell Farm, New Richmond, Wisconsin
