= Clara Hill House =

Historic building in Meridian, Idaho, US

- U.S. National Register of Historic Places
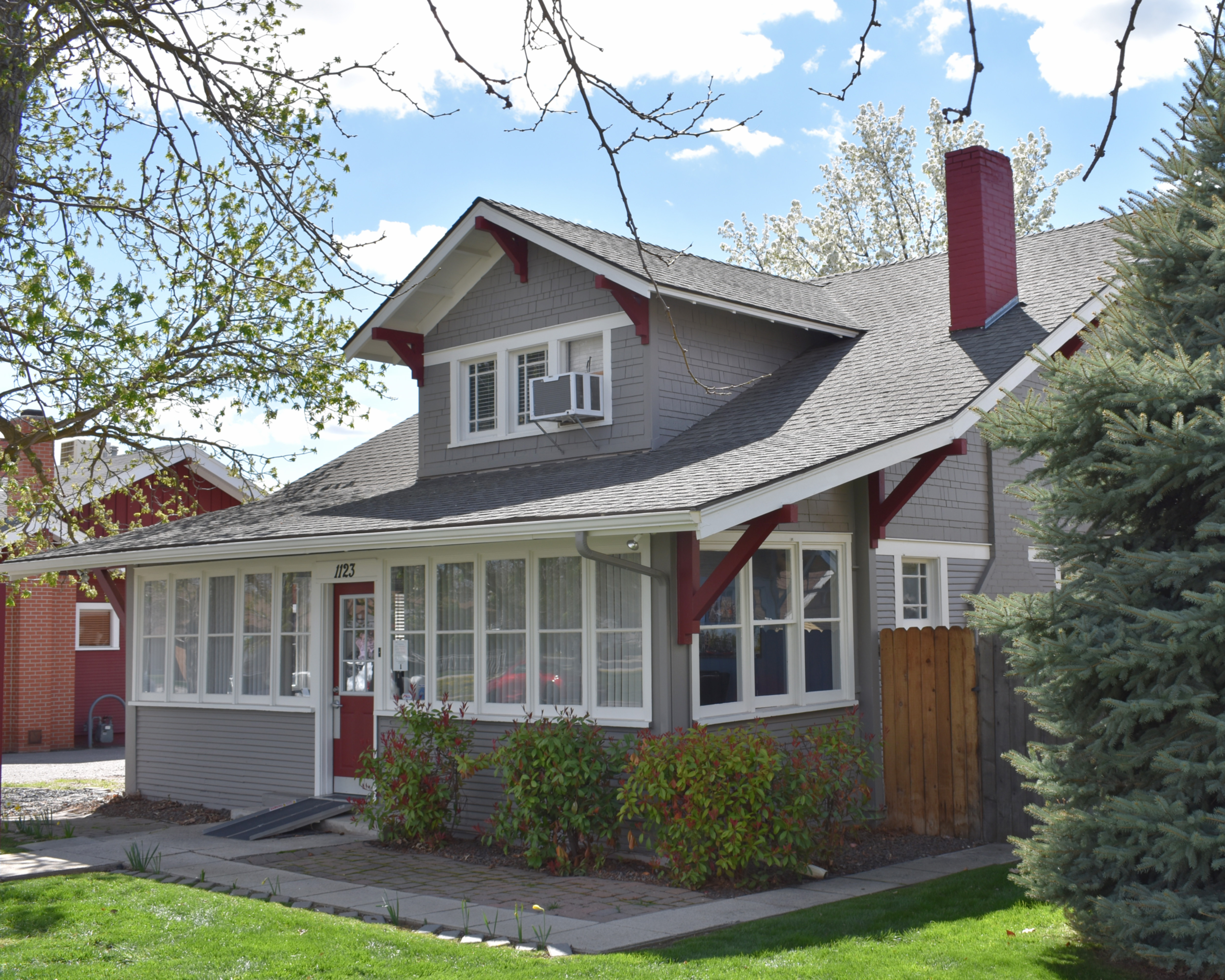
- The Clara Hill House in 2019

- Location within Idaho Location within the United States
- Location: 1123 N. Main St., Meridian, Idaho
- Coordinates: 43°36′52″N 116°23′28″W
- Area: less than one acre
- Built: 1920
- Built by: Artz, Charles F.
- Architectural style: Bungalow/craftsman
- NRHP reference No.: 05001600
- Added to NRHP: February 1, 2006

The Clara Hill House in Meridian, Idaho, is a 1 1/2-story Craftsman Bungalow constructed in 1919–20. The house features an enclosed porch facing North Main Street, with a front facing gabled dormer above and behind the porch. The lateral ridge beam extends beyond left and right dormered gables. First floor exterior walls are clad in weatherboard, and gable walls are covered in wood shingles. The house was added to the National Register of Historic Places in 2006.

== History ==
Charles F. Artz, a local excavation and building contractor, began construction of the Clara Hill House, part of Meridian's Nourse Third Addition, in May, 1919. Artz sold the house in February, 1920, to Arthur and Mae Estes. Sheep rancher Arthur Estes recently had been appointed state sheep inspector. Artz sold additional property at the site to Mae Estes in June, 1920, and Estes purchased more adjacent property from its developer, Frank Nourse, in December.

In 1925 Mae Estes filed for divorce, claiming that Arthur Estes had been unfaithful. She may have owned the house and property until her death in 1938.

Sheep rancher Angus Hill died in 1938, and his widow, Clara Hill, purchased the house in that year. She occupied the house until her death in 1966.

Since the mid 1990s, Dorian Photography has owned the Clara Hill House.

== See also ==
- R. H. and Jessie Bell House
