= Belhus =

Belhus may refer to:

- Belhus, Western Australia
- Belhus, Essex
  - Belhus (ward)

== See also ==
- Bell House (disambiguation)
