= Ernest Bellhouse =

English footballer

Personal information
- Full name: Ernest Walter Bellhouse
- Date of birth: 15 July 1871
- Place of birth: Sale, England
- Date of death: 1920 (aged 48–49)
- Position: Half back

Senior career*
Years	Team	Apps	(Gls)
1887	Repton School		
1889	Derby County	2	(0)
- * Club domestic league appearances and goals

Ernest Bellhouse (1871-1920) was an English footballer who played in the Football League for Derby County.

Ernest Bellhouse played association football for the famous Derbyshire school Repton from 1887. The records do not show if he was a pupil but as he was 16 in 1887 he was likely to be.

Centre-Half had been a problem position for Derby County in 1888-1889 and various players were tried. J Smith had become the regular centre-half but he missed/was unavailable for the Boxing Day match against Bolton Wanderers. Smith again was unavailable, this time for the visit of Wolverhampton Wanderers on 12 January. This gave Bellhouse his opportunity and he took the centre-half position, aged 17 years 171 days and he had to face Wolves centre-forward, John Brodie who had scored 10 goals in 12 games. Ernest Bellhouse and his defence colleagues had a magnificent game against one of the best teams of those days. On a windy and rainy day Derby County dominated the first-half against what was described as a "poor Wolves team". Derby County led 2–0 at half-time but once again the clean-sheet was thanks to County goalkeeper Joseph Marshall. The second half was more close-fought but Derby County got their third goal 20 minutes from the end which caused the County Ground, Derby to start to empty out because of the wet weather. Derby County won 3-0 not only achieving their third win but achieving their first clean-sheet in a League match. Ernest Bellhouse was retained but, as J Smith was fit to play for the trip to Turf Moor, Burnley on 19-Jan-1889 Bellhouse was moved to right-half to cover the absence of regular first-team player, Albert Williamson. Derby County lost 0–1.

Ernest Bellhouse never played top-flight football again.

Derby County finished 10th in the Football League and had to seek re-election. They scored 41 goals and conceded 61 goals in 22 games, the third worst defence of the season.

Bellhouse died at the age of 48/49 in 1920.
