= Hill McClelland Bell House =

Historic house in Iowa, United States

- U.S. National Register of Historic Places
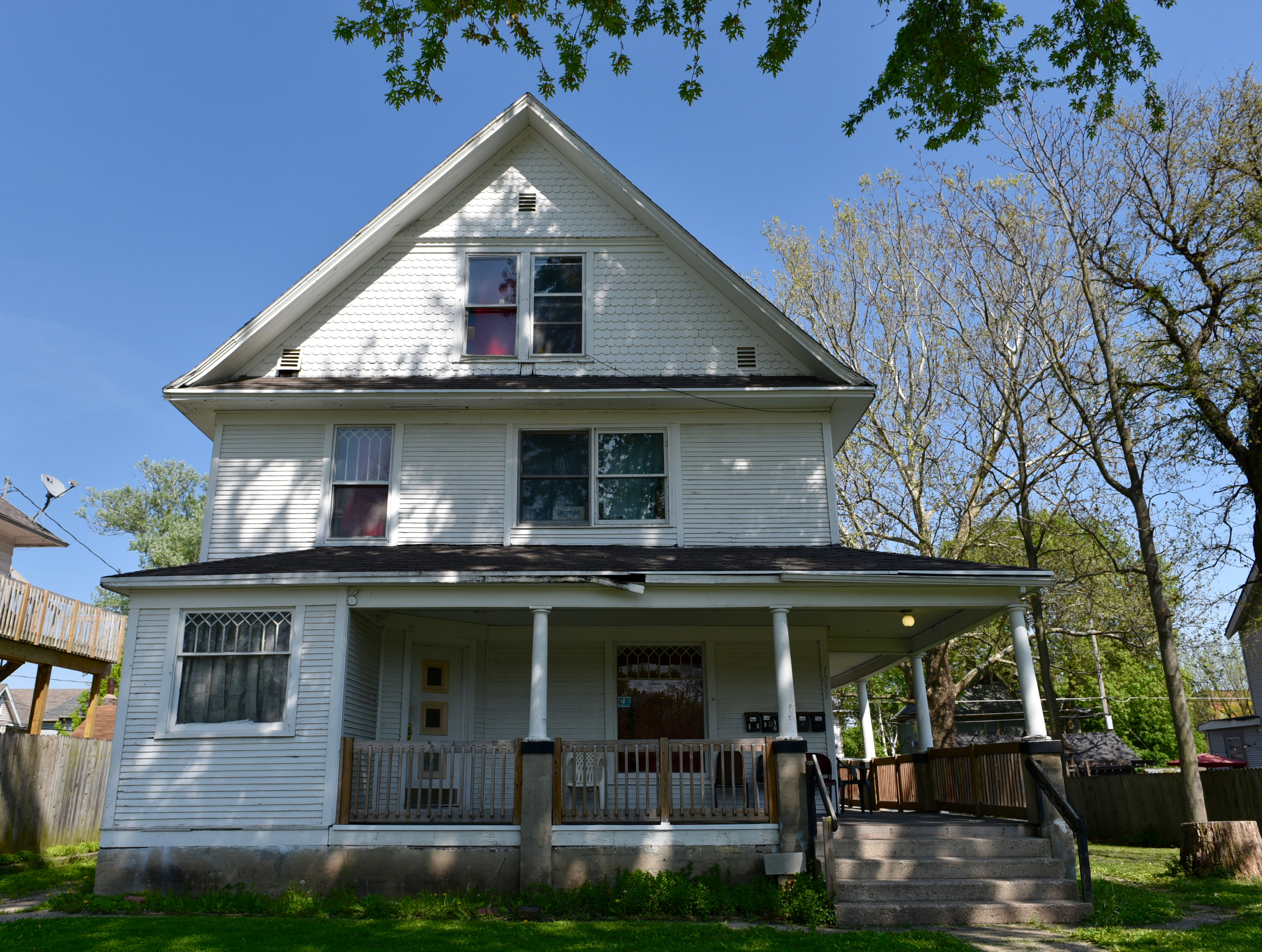

- Location within Iowa Location within the United States
- Location: 1091 26th St., Des Moines, Iowa
- Coordinates: 41°35′52.3″N 93°39′06.8″W
- Area: less than one acre
- Built: 1902
- Architectural style: Late Victorian
- MPS: Drake University and Related Properties in Des Moines, Iowa, 1881--1918 MPS
- NRHP reference No.: 88001334
- Added to NRHP: January 11, 1988

The Hill McClelland Bell House is a historic building located in Des Moines, Iowa, United States. Built 1902, the 2½-story structure features a rectangular plan, a gable front, and a wrap-around porch. Decorative elements include wood shingles in the gable end, and some of the windows have a diamond mullion pattern. The house's significance is derived from its association with Hill McClelland Bell, president of Drake University from 1902 to 1918. This was a period of dramatic growth for the college. It was during his tenure that the institution was accredited with the North Central Association of Secondary Schools and Colleges, the establishment of a faculty pension, an increase in the school's endowment, a decrease in its debts, eminent professors joined the faculty, and several colleges were reorganized. Enrollment increased during this period of time, and five significant buildings were built on campus. The house was listed on the National Register of Historic Places in 1988.
