= R. H. and Jessie Bell House =

Historic building in Meridian, Idaho

- R.H. and Jessie Bell House
- U.S. National Register of Historic Places
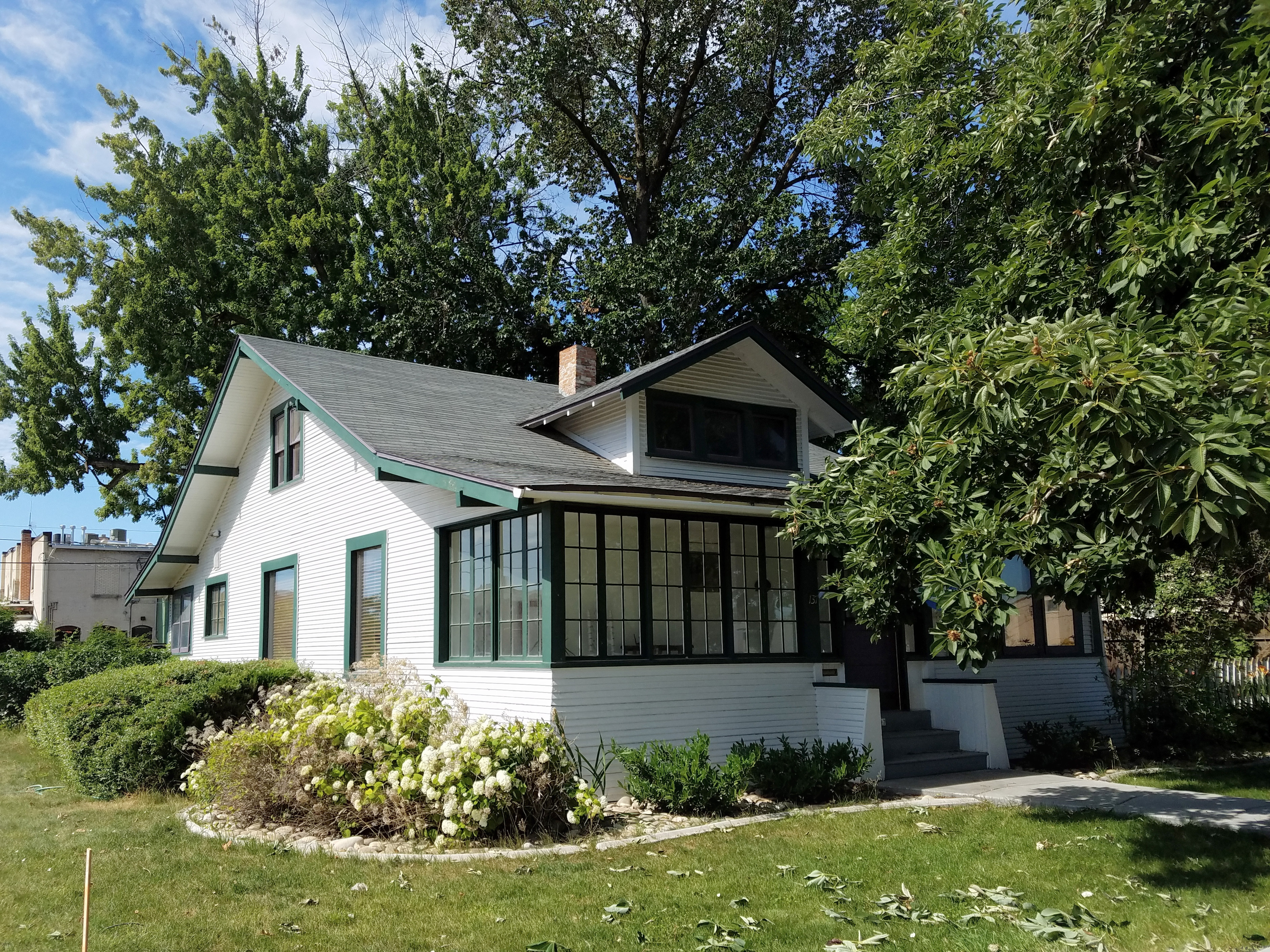
- The R.H. and Jessie Bell House in 2018

- Location within Idaho Location within the United States
- Location: 137 E. Pine St., Meridian, Idaho
- Coordinates: 43°36′42″N 116°23′22″W
- Area: less than one acre
- Built: 1922
- Built by: Artz, Charles
- Architect: Krulish, John
- Architectural style: Bungalow/craftsman
- NRHP reference No.: 05001599
- Added to NRHP: February 1, 2006

The R.H. and Jessie Bell House in Meridian, Idaho, is a 1 1/2-story Craftsman Bungalow designed by John Krulish and constructed in 1922. A lateral ridgebeam runs parallel to Pine Street and extends the roof beyond gabled dormer windows at left and right. A front dormer is prominent above and behind a cross facade, enclosed porch. The house was added to the National Register of Historic Places in 2006.

The Bell House was designed for Sam H. Griffith, mayor of Meridian, at the end of his term of office. Griffith and R.H. Bell were partners in the Meridian Coal Company.

A separate account allows that the Bell House was constructed by Charles Artz in 1920 for Sam H. Griffith, the manager of Meridian Lumber. When Bell became manager of the firm, he purchased the house and the lumber company.

== Ralph H. and Jessie M. Bell ==
Ralph H. (Jack) and Jessie M. Bell were active in Meridian social life, and Ralph Bell managed the Meridian Elevator Company, a grain storage firm. Bell later served as president of the Meridian Building & Loan Association. Jessie Bell served as president of Meridian Ladies' Aid, Woman's Society of Christian Service, and United Methodist Women.

== See also ==
- Clara Hill House
