= Bell-Johnson House =

- U.S. National Register of Historic Places
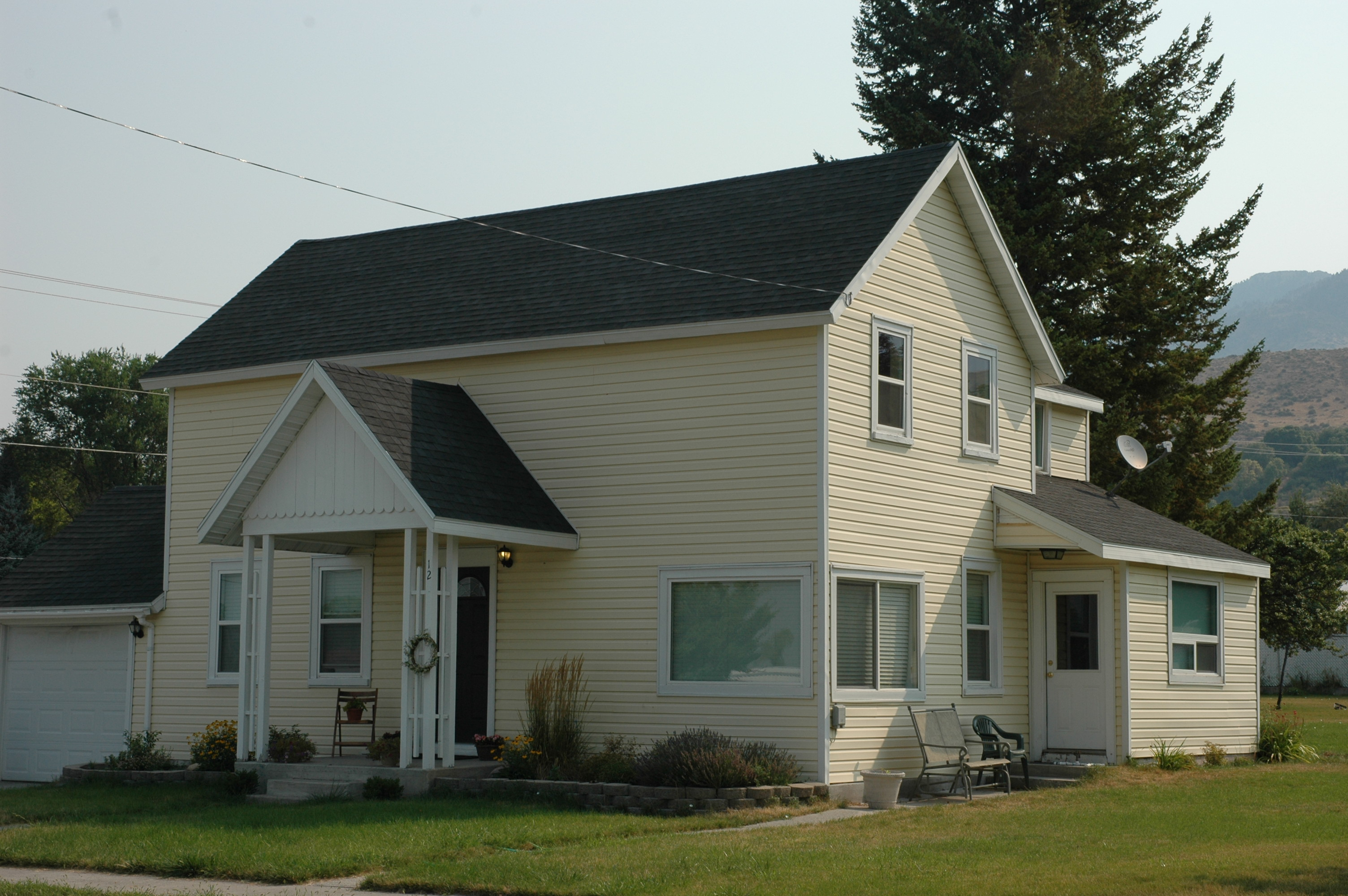

- Location within Utah Location within the United States
- Location: 12 North 200 East, Richmond, Utah
- Coordinates: 41°55′30″N 111°48′05″W
- Area: 0.4 acres (0.16 ha)
- Built: c.1875
- Architectural style: Late Victorian, Late 19th And 20th Century Revivals
- MPS: Richmond, Utah MPS
- NRHP reference No.: 04001118
- Added to NRHP: October 8, 2004

The Bell-Johnson House, at 12 North 200 East in Richmond, Utah, was built around 1875. It was listed on the National Register of Historic Places in 2004. The listing included three contributing buildings.

It is Late Victorian in style.
