= Alvin Bushnell Bell House =

Historic house in Iowa, United States

- U.S. National Register of Historic Places
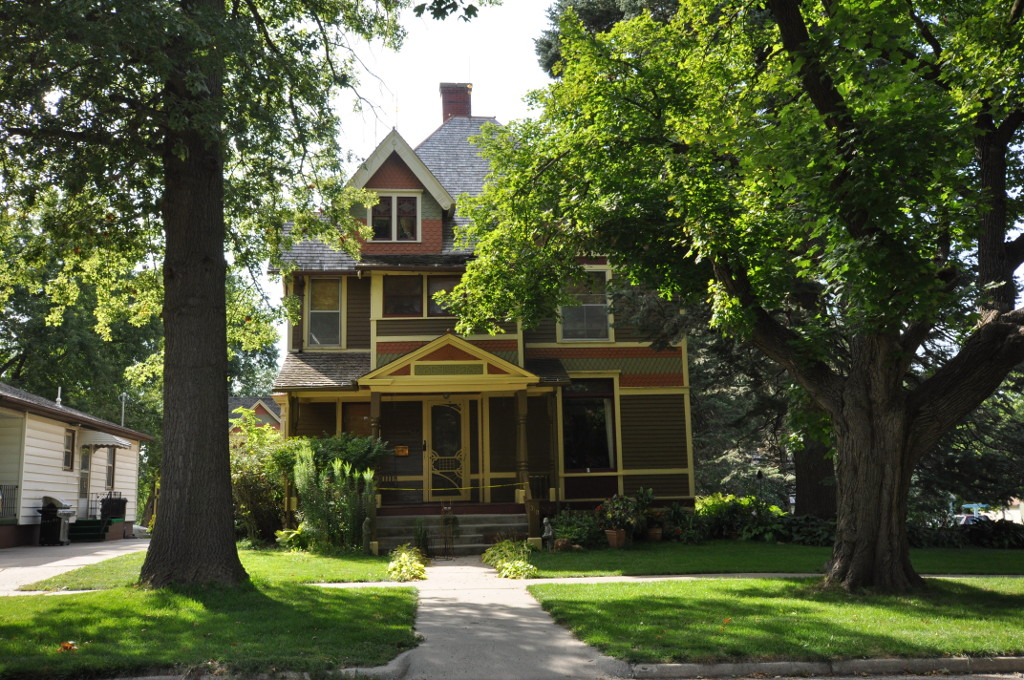

- Location within Iowa Location within the United States
- Location: 310 Quimby St., Ida Grove, Iowa
- Coordinates: 42°20′37″N 95°28′27″W
- Area: less than one acre
- Built: 1895
- Built by: Thomas & Wm. Bassett
- Architect: George Franklin Barber
- Architectural style: Queen Anne
- NRHP reference No.: 83000369
- Added to NRHP: January 27, 1983

The Alvin Bushnell Bell House, also known as the Kee House, is a historic building located in Ida Grove, Iowa, United States. Alvin Bell was a native of Indiana and moved to Ida County in 1880. He was initially engaged in farming before he moved to Ida Grove where he was involved in a successful career in the livestock industry. By 1894, he had started to purchase land that would become the 1,200-acre (490 ha) Bell Ranch. The design of the house reflects one of the "mail order" houses of George Franklin Barber. It was constructed by local builders Thomas and William Bassett, and completed in 1895. The house is a 2 1/2-story frame house in the Queen Anne style. It is capped with a high hipped, cross gabled roof. The exterior features rich exterior ornamentation. Also on the property is one non-contributing structure. The house was listed on the National Register of Historic Places on January 27, 1983.
