= Michael Bellhouse =

English cricketer

Personal information
- Full name: Michael Ramsay Bellhouse
- Born: 11 October 1976 (age 50); Wandsworth, London, England
- Batting: Right-handed
- Bowling: Right-arm fast-medium

Domestic team information
- Years: Team
- 1997–2001: Oxfordshire

Career statistics
Competition	List A
Matches	2
Runs scored	33
Batting average	16.50
100s/50s	0/0
Top score	24
Balls bowled	108
Wickets	0
Bowling average	–
5 wickets in innings	–
10 wickets in match	–
Best bowling	–
Catches/stumpings	0/–
- Source: Cricinfo, 19 May 2011

Michael Ramsay Bellhouse (born 11 October 1976) is a former English cricketer. Bellhouse was a right-handed batsman who bowled right-arm fast-medium. He was born in Wandsworth, London.

Bellhouse made his debut for Oxfordshire in the 1997 MCCA Knockout Trophy against Bedfordshire. Bellhouse played Minor counties cricket for Oxfordshire from 1997 to 2001, which included 13 Minor Counties Championship matches and 3 MCCA Knockout Trophy matches. He made his List A debut against Wales Minor Counties in the 2000 NatWest Trophy. He played his second and final List A match against Huntingdonshire in the 2001 Cheltenham & Gloucester Trophy. In his 2 List A matches he scored 33 runs at a batting average of 16.50, with a high score of 24. With the ball he bowled 18 wicket-less overs.

He also played Second XI cricket for the Middlesex Second XI in 1999.
