= Bell-Spalding House =

- U.S. National Register of Historic Places
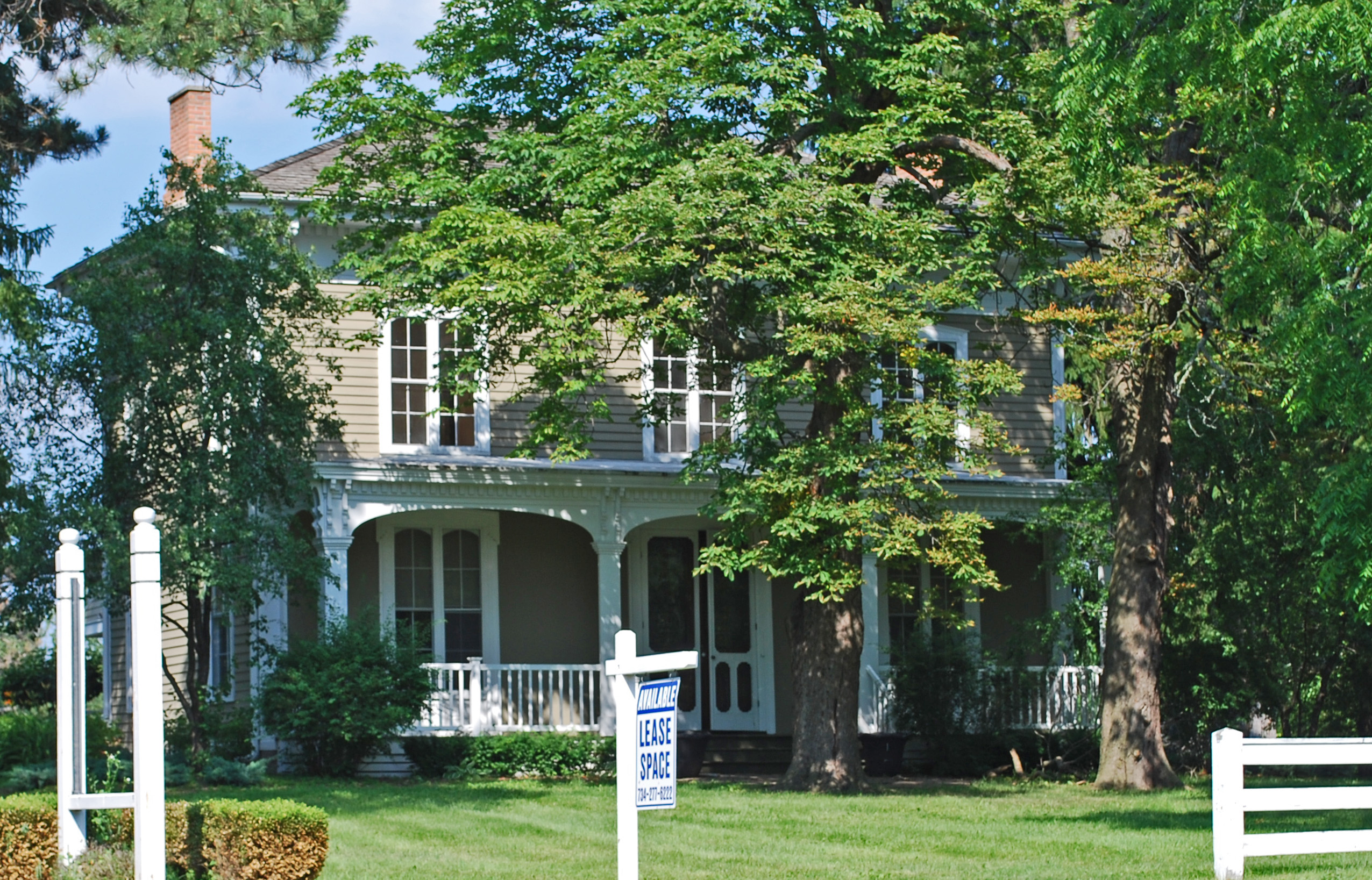

- Location within Michigan Location within the United States
- Interactive map showing the location of the Bell-Spalding House
- Location: 2117 Washtenaw Ave., Ann Arbor, Michigan
- Coordinates: 42°15′55″N 83°43′05″W
- Area: 7 acres (2.8 ha)
- Built: 1854
- Architectural style: Greek Revival, Italianate
- NRHP reference No.: 90001957
- Added to NRHP: December 28, 1990

The Bell-Spalding House, also known as the Tuomy House, is a single-family home located at 2117 Washtenaw Avenue in Ann Arbor, Michigan. It was listed on the National Register of Historic Places in 1990.

== History ==
Beginning in 1853, George W. and Jane E. Bell consolidated a number of smaller parcels into a larger farmstead. Most likely in 1854, the couple built a small Greek Revival farmhouse that is now the rear ell of the current building. In 1859, the Bells sold their property to Ransom and Hariot Richards, who in turn sold it to David and Julia Henning in 1863. The Hennings sold the portion of the land which included this house to Frederick A. and Almina S. Spalding (or Spaulding) in 1864. Frederick Spalding was born in about 1800 in Cayuga County, New York and his wife, Almina Shaw, was born in about 1818. They lived in New York until 1863 or 1864, when they moved to this property.

Soon after purchasing the property, the Spaldings constructed the Italianate dwelling that comprises most of the current house, attaching it to the already-extant Greek Revival house. The Spaldings devoted themselves to farming the property, living here until Frederick's death in 1874. Their sons, Frederick Jr, and Volney, established themselves in the Ann Arbor community. Frederick Spalding Jr graduated from the University of Michigan medical school and set up a practice in Ann Arbor, and Volney Spalding became a botany professor at the University, as well as the founder of the University Botanical Gardens. After Frederick Sr's death, Almina moved in with her son Frederick Jr until her own death in 1889.

After Frederick Sr's death in 1874, the farmstead was purchased by brothers Patrick and Cornelius L. Tuomy, with Cornelius farming the land and taking up residence in the house. The Tuomys were sons of Irish immigrants who had settled in Washtenaw County in 1835. Cornelius farmed the land as a bachelor until his marriage to Julia Ann Kearney ("a woman of rare intelligence, social power, and popularity") in 1885. They raised three children: Bill, Kathryn, and Thomas, and lived in the house until Cornelius's death in 1912. Thomas died in 1918, and when Bill returned from World War I in 1919, he and Kathryn went into the real estate business, developing some of the farmstead.

Kathryn Tuomy died in 1965 and Bill Tuomy followed in 1966. The house and two surrounding acres were transferred to the University of Michigan, for use as the headquarters of the Historical Society of Michigan and the Academy of Arts, Science and Letters. In 1982, the ownership of the house was transferred to the Society outright. In 2007 the Society sold it to a private owner.

== Description ==
The Bell-Spalding House was built in two primary sections. The original portion, from about 1854, is a one-and-one-half-story timber-framed Greek Revival structure. The main portion, from about 1864, is a two-story, three-bay, Italianate structure. Further, single-story additions surround the 1854 section.

The original 1854 section is timber-framed and wood-sheathed on a fieldstone foundation coated with cement. The original center entrance with flanking sidelights is still located within the house. The house likely originally had first floor windows and a single-story porch, but these are now covered over with additions. However, the front facade's three frieze windows, board-and-batten siding, and eavesline, and gable roof are all still visible.

The 1864 Italianate addition is a balloon-framed structure covered with clapboard with a hipped roof. It sits on a fieldstone foundation coated with cement. It has a center double-door entryway flanked with pairs of four-over-four, double-hung sash window units with pediments above and kickplates below. The siding is tongue-and-groove rather than clapboard on the first floor level. A porch spans the width of the first floor. The second floor contains three evenly spaced pairs of four-over-four double-hung sash window units similar to those on the first floor.

Other additions, likely also from 1864, surround the 1854 house. These are single-story, shed-roofed extensions with double-hung windows.

== See also ==
- Tuomy Hills Service Station
