= Marcus Sears Bell Farm =

- U.S. National Register of Historic Places
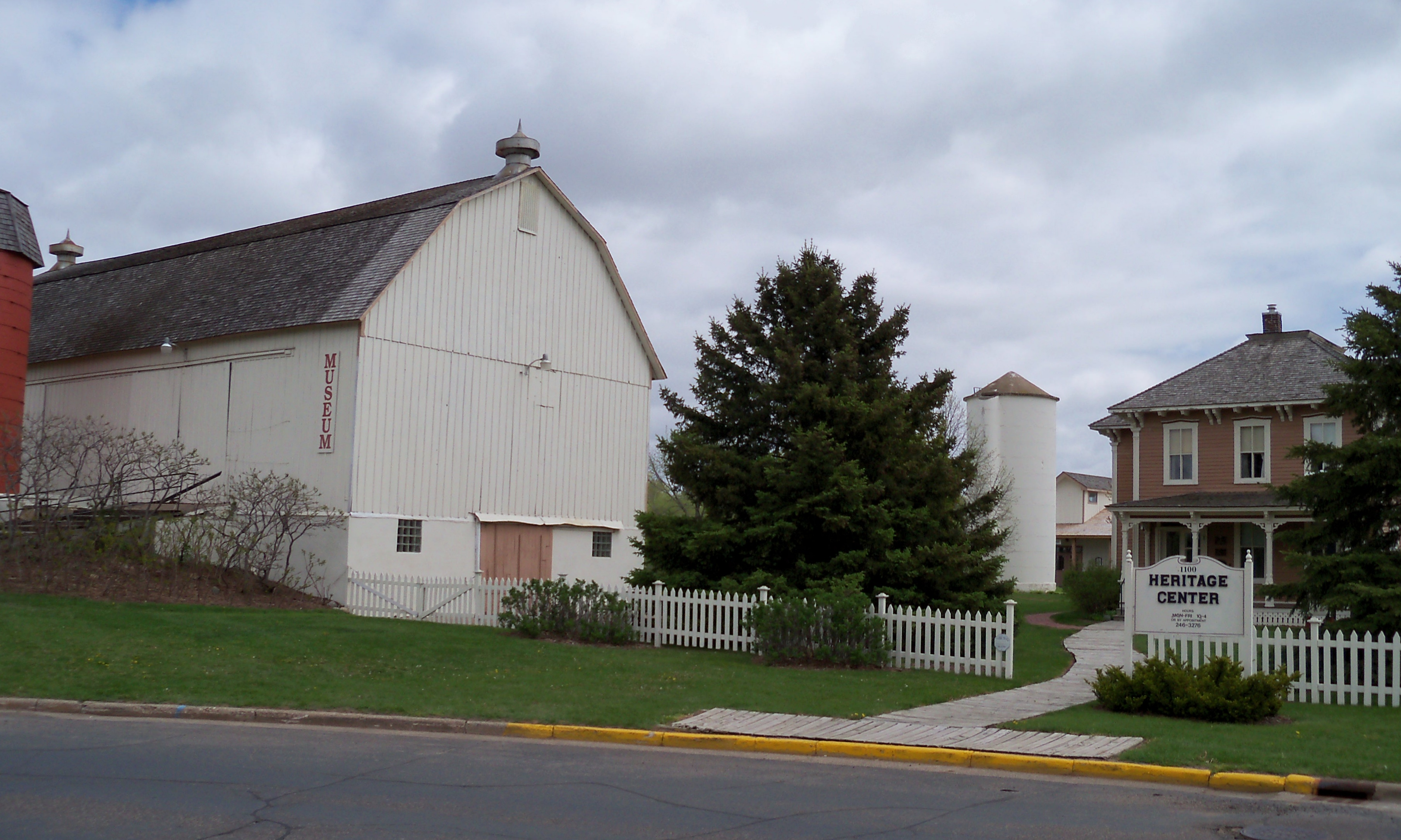
- Marcus Sears Bell Farm

- Location within Wisconsin Location within the United States
- Location: 1100 Heritage Dr. New Richmond, Wisconsin
- Coordinates: 45°06′38″N 92°32′06″W
- Area: 1.7 acres (0.69 ha)
- Built: 1884
- Architectural style: Italianate
- MPS: New Richmond MRA
- NRHP reference No.: 88000614
- Added to NRHP: May 31, 1988

The Marcus Sears Bell Farm, also known as the Bell-Tierney Farmstead, is located in New Richmond, Wisconsin, United States. It was added to the National Register of Historic Places in 1988.

It includes a two-story Italianate farmhouse with a hipped roof and with endboard pilasters.

The house was moved about 300 feet (91 m) in 1982 to avoid demolition.

== New Richmond Heritage Center ==
The Bell-Tierney Farmstead is now the central site of the New Richmond Heritage Center. Other historic buildings on the property include a log barn with blacksmith and carpenter tool collections, a one-room schoolhouse, a mid-20th century rural general store, and a late 19th-century Lutheran church.
