= Dr. James Bell House =

Historic house in Ohio, United States

- U.S. National Register of Historic Places
- U.S. Historic district – Contributing property
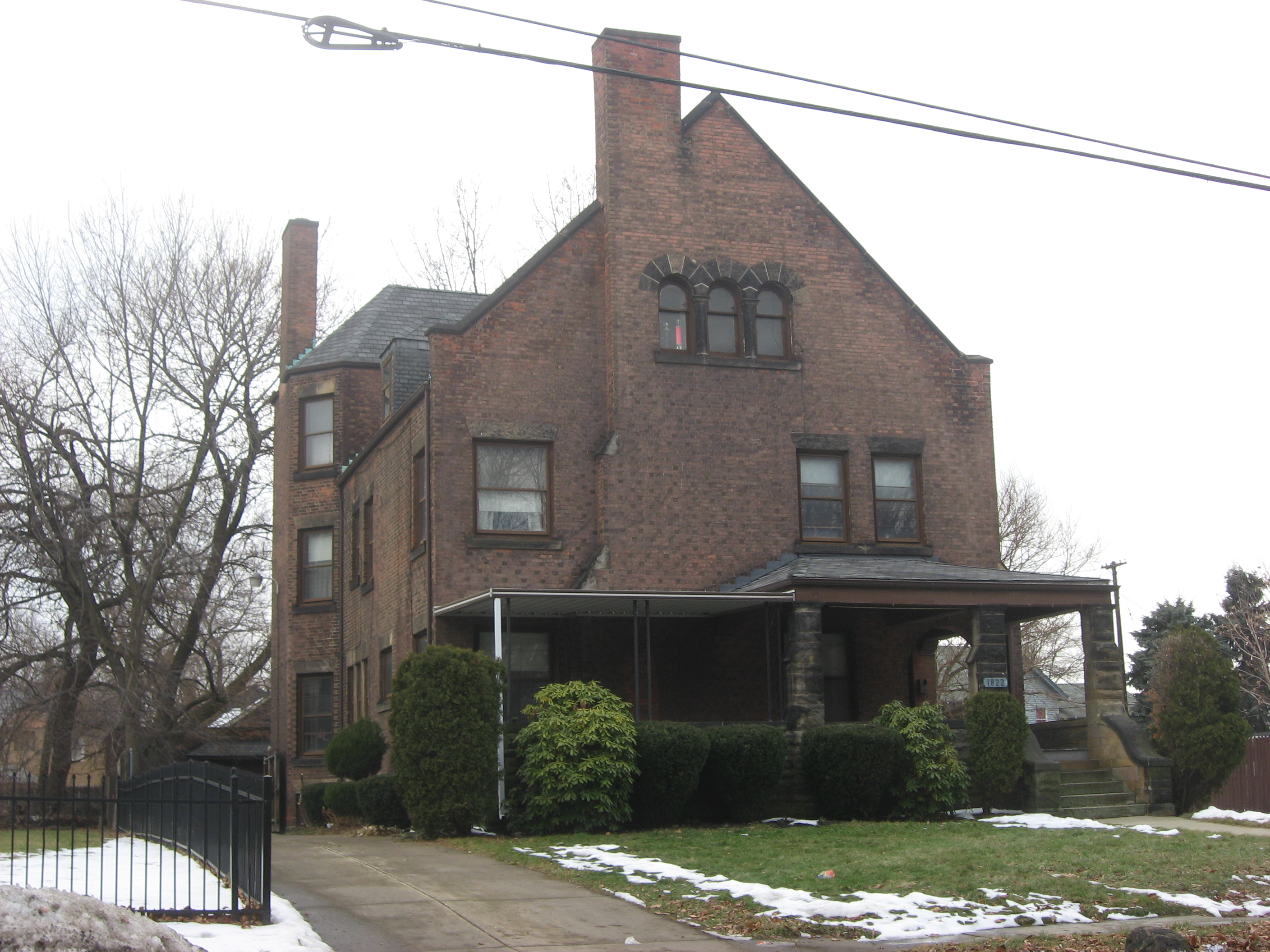

- Location within Cleveland Location within Ohio Location within the United States
- Location: 1822 E. 89th Street, Cleveland, Ohio, U.S.
- Coordinates: 41°30′28″N 81°37′30″W
- Built: 1901
- Architect: George J. Hardway
- Architectural style: Richardsonian Romanesque
- Part of: East 89th Street Historic District (ID88000678)
- NRHP reference No.: 86002878

Significant dates
- Added to NRHP: October 16, 1986
- Designated NRHP: October 16, 1986
- Designated CP: May 26, 1988

The Dr. James Bell House, also known as the Bell-Williams House, is a historic home located at 1822 E. 89th Street in Cleveland, Ohio, in the United States. Designed by noted local architect George J. Hardway for Dr. James Bell (a local dentist), it was completed in 1901. The home is a prime example of the Cleveland-area reaction at the end of the 19th century against high Victorian architecture, utilizing elements of Richardsonian Romanesque architecture to create a highly individualized, severe style.

The home was added to the National Register of Historic Places on October 16, 1986. The home is part of the East 89th Street Historic District, which was added to the National Register of Historic Places on May 26, 1988.

== About the house ==
James Richard Bell was a prominent dentist in Cleveland in the late 19th and early 20th centuries. In 1900, he commissioned noted local architect George J. Hardway to design a large residence on E. 89th Street in the southeast quadrant of the Hough neighborhood, one of the city's oldest settled areas and which at that time was inhabited largely by white, middle-class and upper-middle-class residents. The block on which Bell chose to build was built up with a number of large residences over the past 30 years, ranging in style from Italianate to extremely elaborate Queen Anne style. The increasingly elaborate embellishments of Victorian architecture had fallen out of favor with homeowners and architects in northeast Ohio by the late 1890s, and Bell and Hardway agreed on a home that was simple to the point of being severe.

The Bell House is largely Richardsonian Romanesque in style. However, it deviates from this style by featuring a contemporary massing and relying on plain exterior walls. The three-story structure is constructed of stone and brick. The front of the house is roughly square, with an east-facing gable, a single dormer on the south side, and steep roof pitch. The third-floor windows are topped by round stone arches, with stone slabs constituting the lintel and sill of the first and second story windows. A rusticated stone porch with canopy provided the entrance to the house. The narrow-depth center section of the house features projecting polygonal bay windows on all three floors on the south side. This projection is topped by a hip-end roof. The north side of the center section is essentially a triple-wide dormer or gable facing north, with a gable roof. The rear of the building, which is about as large as the front section, returns to the square plan, although it features two dormers on the north side and none on the south. The home originally had 12 rooms, four baths, and a third-floor ballroom. By the 1970s, the ballroom had been divided and the house now had a total of 21 rooms.

Bell occupied the home until his death in 1912. The home was bequeathed to his wife, Anna Roeder Bell. She died in 1940, and bequeathed the home to her daughter, Frieda Meriam. Mrs. Meriam died in 1942, and the home was sold to John A. Smith in 1943. By 1947, the home belonged to the Sabo family, and by 1948 the Jaskell family. By 1956, it was owned by Enoch Spence, who sold it by 1961 to Harold C. Scheunemann, who in turn sold it to Raymond Beedlow by 1966.

The Hough neighborhood became an overwhelmingly poor African American area by 1960. In May 1968, the mansion was purchased by the Berry Foundation. It became the home of the Martin Luther King Residential Youth House, a residential home for troubled black youth. The ballroom was probably turned into bedrooms about this time. In the early or mid 1970s, the youth house closed, and the Lee Heights Community Church rented the structure for use by The Straight-up Half-Way House, a transitional residence for alcoholics, criminals, and drug addicts.

The Berry Foundation sold the house in 1979 to a private owner, Margaret J. Williams.

Because it exemplifies the local architectural reaction to the excesses of Victorian architecture, the house was added to the National Register of Historic Places on October 16, 1986. It was also named a Cleveland Landmark by the Cleveland Landmarks Commission, under the name Bell-Williams House.
