= Bell House (Searcy, Arkansas) =

Historic house in Arkansas, United States

- U.S. National Register of Historic Places
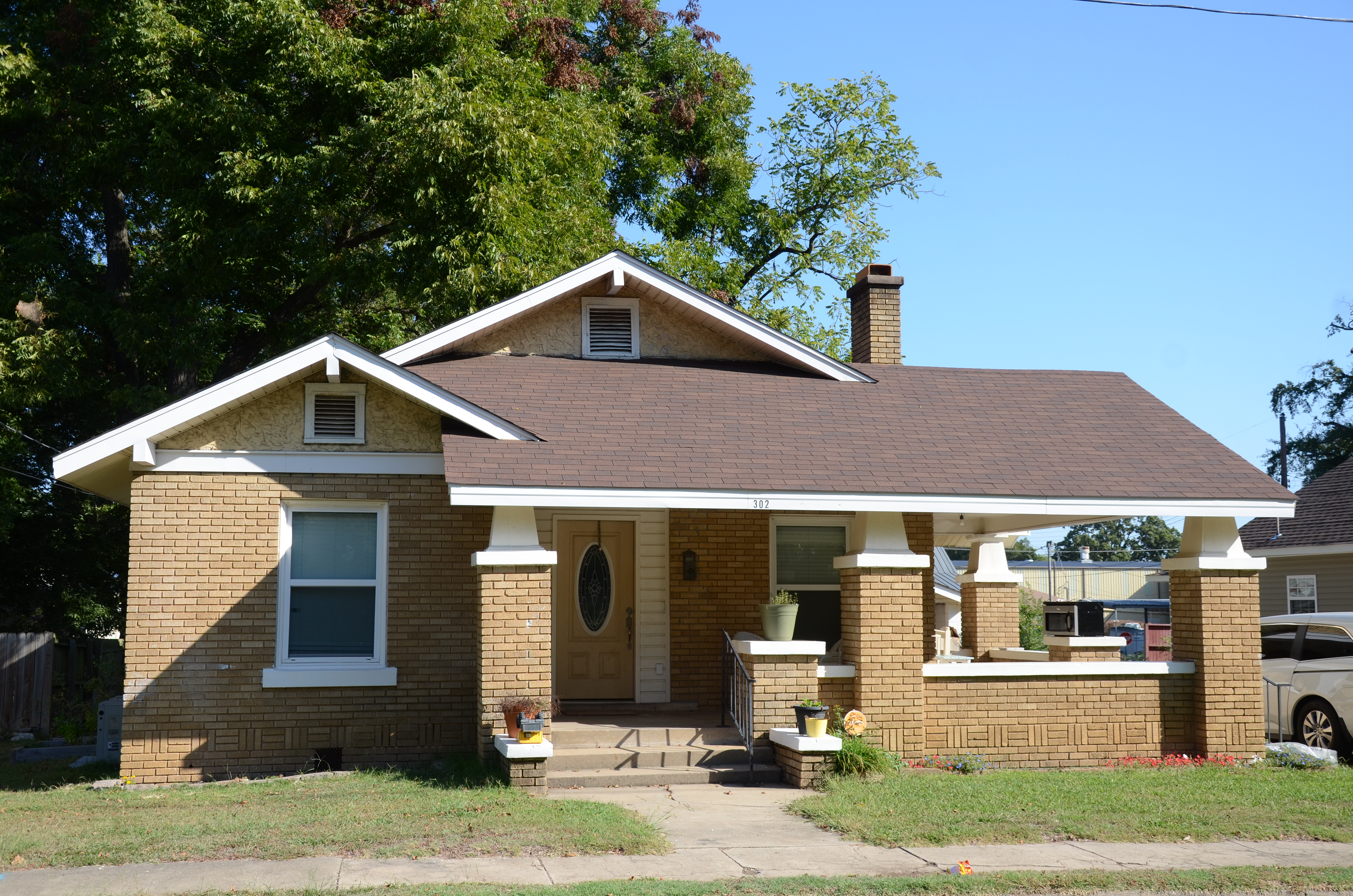

- Location within Arkansas Location within the United States
- Location: 302 W. Woodruff Ave., Searcy, Arkansas
- Coordinates: 35°14′47″N 91°44′24″W
- Area: less than one acre
- Built: 1915
- Architectural style: Bungalow/craftsman
- MPS: White County MPS
- NRHP reference No.: 91001201
- Added to NRHP: September 5, 1991

The Bell House is a historic house at 302 West Woodruff Avenue in Searcy, Arkansas. It is a single-story brick structure, with an irregular roofline. A porch, headed by a side gable entrance projects to the right, continuing across the front to meet a small front-gable projecting in front of a higher front-facing gable roof. The porch is supported by high brick piers topped by short wooden posts. Built in 1915, it is a fine local example of Craftsman architecture.

The house was listed on the National Register of Historic Places in 1991.

== See also ==
- National Register of Historic Places listings in White County, Arkansas
