= Lake-Bell House =

Historic house in Arkansas, United States

- U.S. National Register of Historic Places
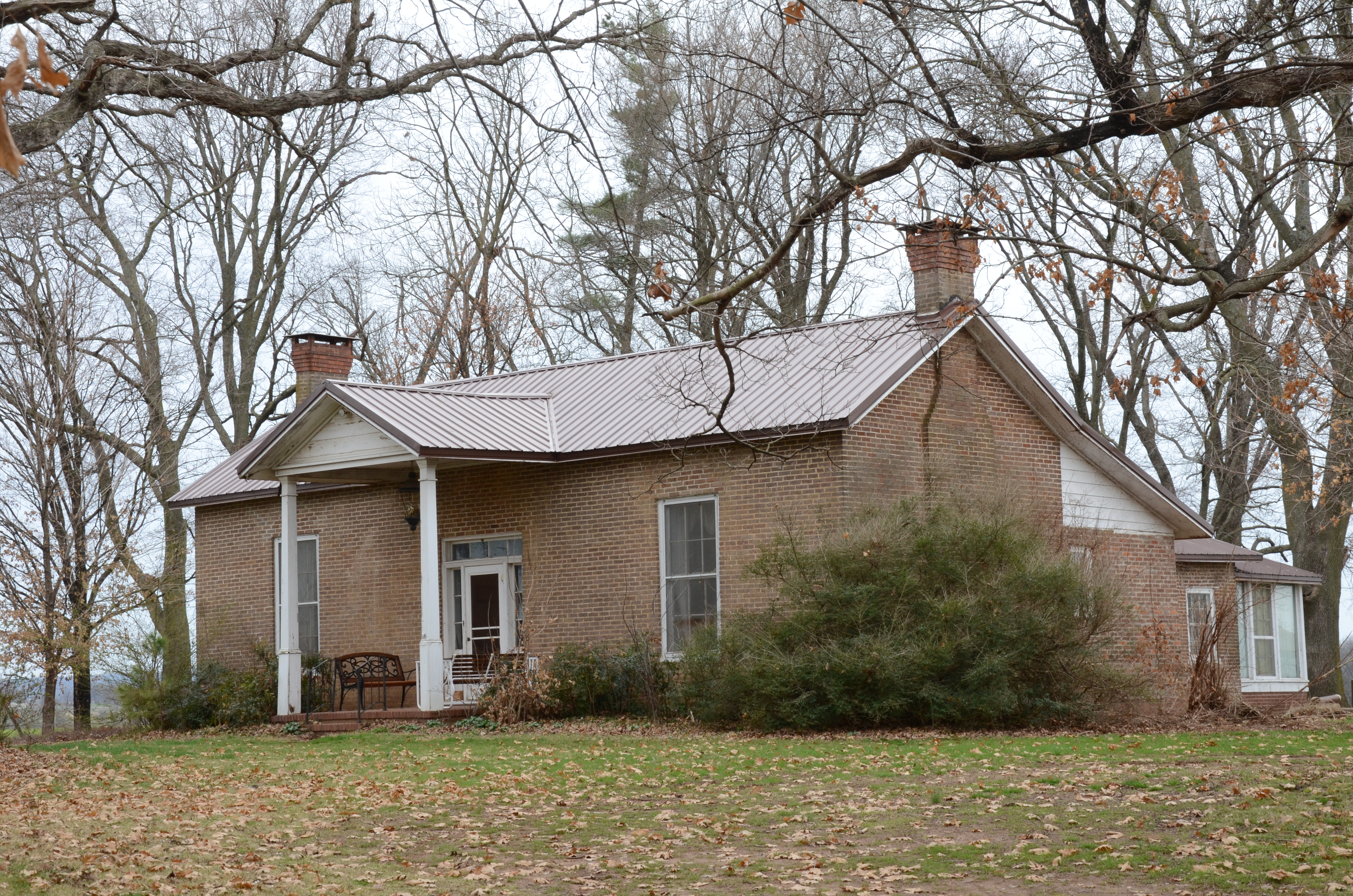

- Location within Arkansas Location within the United States
- Nearest city: Prairie Grove, Arkansas
- Coordinates: 36°0′3″N 94°18′12″W
- Area: less than one acre
- Built: 1871
- Built by: Alexander Hendry
- Architectural style: Greek Revival, Georgian
- NRHP reference No.: 74000504
- Added to NRHP: November 8, 1974

The Lake-Bell House is a historic house in rural Washington County, Arkansas. It is located just north of a westward bend in County Road 80 on the north side of Prairie Grove Battlefield State Park. It is a single-story brick structure, with a side-gable roof and a gabled front entry portico with square columns. The front facade is a spare three bays wide, and the main block is but one bay deep, but obscures a rear ell that enlarges the building substantially. The house's construction date is uncertain, but it was probably built c. 1870 by Milton F. Lake, who moved to the area after the American Civil War.

The house was listed on the National Register of Historic Places in 1974.

== See also ==
- National Register of Historic Places listings in Washington County, Arkansas
