= John C. Bell House =

Historic house in Pennsylvania, United States

- U.S. National Register of Historic Places
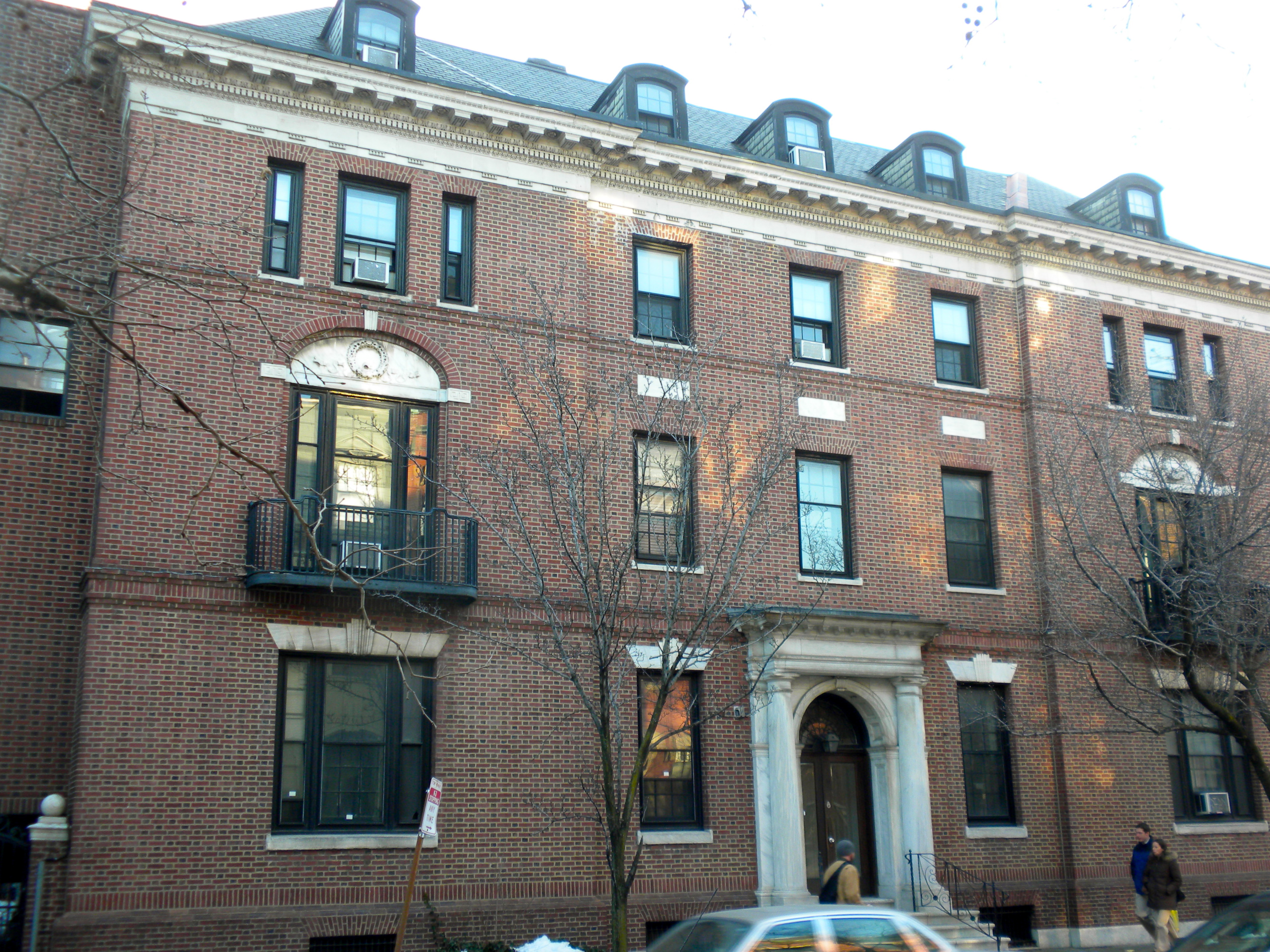

- Location within Philadelphia Location within Pennsylvania Location within the United States
- Location: 229 S. 22nd St., Philadelphia, Pennsylvania
- Coordinates: 39°57′0″N 75°10′40″W
- Area: 0.1 acres (0.040 ha)
- Built: 1906
- Architect: Horace Trumbauer
- Architectural style: Colonial Revival, Neo-Georgian
- NRHP reference No.: 82003807
- Added to NRHP: April 13, 1982

The John C. Bell House is an historic house that is located at 229 South 22nd Street in the Rittenhouse Square neighborhood of Philadelphia, Pennsylvania, United States.

== History and architectural features ==
Designed by architect Horace Trumbauer in the Colonial Revival style, this historic structure was erected in 1906, and was listed on the National Register of Historic Places in 1982.

The house was built for John C. Bell, who served as Attorney General of Pennsylvania. His sons, John C. Bell, Jr., who served as Lieutenant Governor and Governor of Pennsylvania as well as Chief Justice of the Pennsylvania Supreme Court, and Bert Bell, co-founder of the Philadelphia Eagles and NFL Commissioner, lived in the house. In 1944, the house was sold by the Bell family and converted into apartments.

A top-floor balcony collapsed on January 11, 2014, leaving one person dead and two others seriously injured.
