= John Bell House (Lexington, Kentucky) =

Historic house in Kentucky, United States

- U.S. National Register of Historic Places
- Location within Kentucky Location within the United States
- Nearest city: Lexington, Kentucky
- Coordinates: 38°4′59″N 84°31′48″W
- Built: c.1810
- Architectural style: Federal
- MPS: Early Stone Buildings of Central Kentucky TR
- NRHP reference No.: 83002757
- Added to NRHP: June 23, 1983

John Bell House in Lexington, Kentucky, also known as Stonehigh or John Webb House, was built in c. 1810 by John Bell. It was listed on the National Register of Historic Places in 1983.

It is a two-story stone house built c.1810 with a one-story stone ell built at the same time. It also has a one-story brick ell built c.1840 to serve as a kitchen. In 1982 was in excellent condition. It was then in a picturesque rural setting but is now within Lexington.

The property includes a brick smokehouse, a two-story spring house and granary, and more.
