= John Bell Farm =

- U.S. National Register of Historic Places
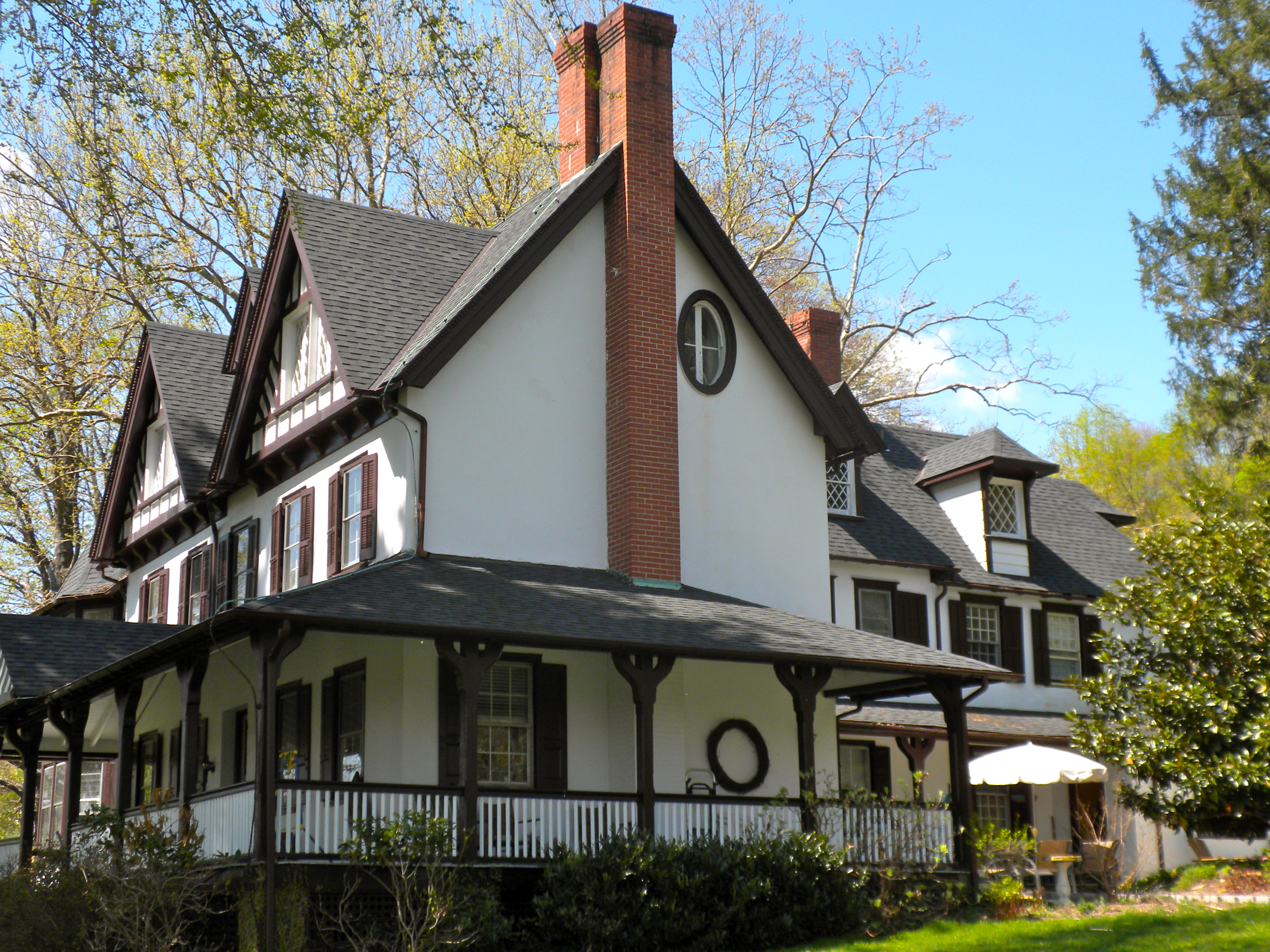
- John Bell Farm, April 2010

- Location within Pennsylvania Location within the United States
- Location: 463 N. Ship Rd., West Whiteland Township, Pennsylvania
- Coordinates: 40°2′39″N 75°37′17″W
- Area: 5.3 acres (2.1 ha)
- Built: 1840
- Architectural style: Queen Anne, Elizabethan
- MPS: West Whiteland Township MRA
- NRHP reference No.: 84003235
- Added to NRHP: September 6, 1984

The John Bell Farm is an historic home and farm complex in West Whiteland Township, Chester County, Pennsylvania, United States.

It was listed on the National Register of Historic Places in 1984.

== History and architectural features ==
This historic complex was originally built during the 1840s and then extensively remodeled in 1889 in the Queen Anne style. The original house consists of the two-story, five-bay, stone central block with two-story service wing. When remodeled, the roof received a cross-gable and dormer windows. Also added was the two-story library wing, kitchen extension, and two-sided porch. Also located on the property are a contributing spring house, tenant house, corn crib, and barn.
