= Ponape (barque) =

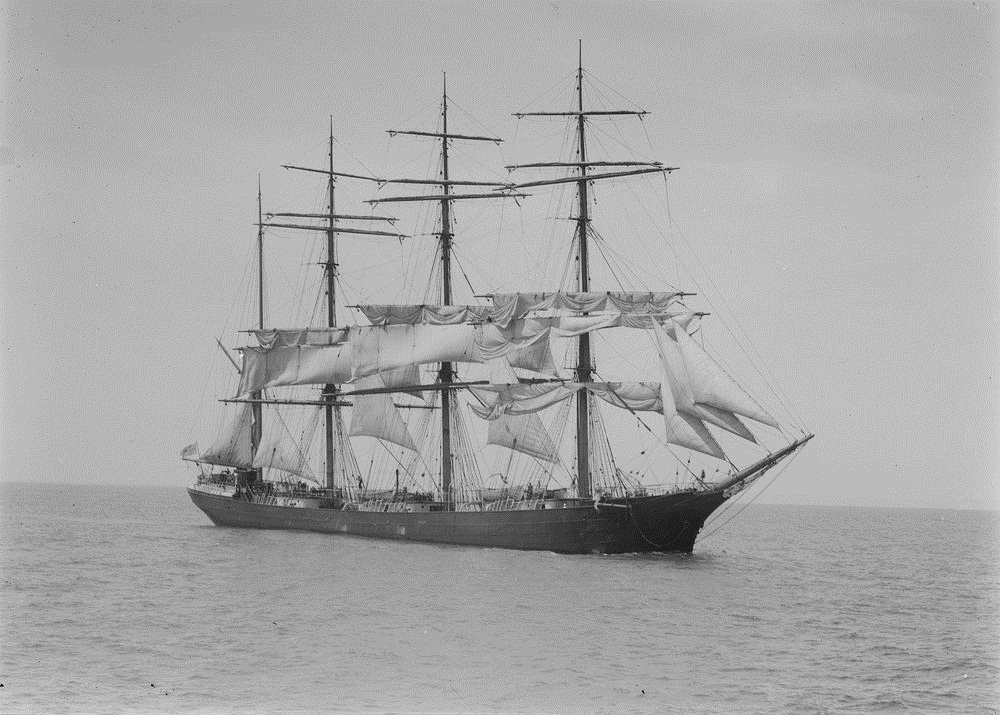

History
- Name: Regina Elena (1903–11); Ponape (1911–14); Bellhouse (1914–25); Ponape (1925–36)
- Namesake: Queen Elena of Italy
- Owner: Pietro Milesi, Genoa (1903–06); A & P Milesi, Genoa (1906–11); F. Laeisz, Hamburg (1911–14); British Government (1914–15); A/S Bellhouse, Tønsberg (1915–25); Hugo Lundqvist, Mariehamn (1925–29); Gustaf Erikson, Mariehamn (1929–36)
- Operator: Pietro Milesi, Genoa (1903–06); A & P Milesi, Genoa (1906–11); F. Laeisz, Hamburg (1911–14); James Bell, Hull (1914–15); Alf Monsen, Tønsberg (1915–25); Hugo Lundqvist, Mariehamn (1925–29); Gustaf Erikson, Mariehamn (1929–36)
- Port of registry: (Italy) Genoa (1903–11); (German Empire) Hamburg (1911–14); (United Kingdom) London (1914–15); (Norway) Tønsberg (1915–25); (Finland) Mariehamn (1925–36)
- Builder: Società Esercizio Baccini, Genoa
- Launched: July 1903
- Completed: July 1903
- In service: 1903
- Identification: Code Letters TPQS (1925–33); Code Letters OHQX (1933–36); Finnish Official Number 778 (1925–36)
- Fate: Scrapped 1936

General characteristics
- Tonnage: 2,342 GRT; 1,974 NRT; 3,500 DWT
- Length: 297 ft 2 in (90.58 m)
- Beam: 42 ft 5 in (12.93 m)
- Depth: 23 ft 2 in (7.06 m)
- Propulsion: sails
- Sail plan: Barque

Ponape was a four-masted steel–hulled barque which was built in 1903 in Italy as Regina Elena for an Italian owner. In 1911 she was sold to Germany and renamed Ponape. In 1914 she was arrested by HMS Majestic and confiscated as a war prize by the Admiralty. She was renamed Bellhouse In 1915 she was sold to Norwegian owners. In 1925, she was sold to Finland and again named Ponape serving until she was scrapped in 1936.

== Description ==
Regina Elena was built by Società Esercizio Bacini, Genoa,. She was 297 feet 2 inches (90.58 m) long, with a beam of 42 feet 5 inches (12.93 m) and a depth of 23 feet 2 inches (7.06 m). She had a GRT of 2,342, and was 1,974 NRT. Her DWT was 3,500. She had four masts and was rigged as a barque, with royal sails over double top and topgallant sails. Regina Elena was launched in July 1903, and completed that month.

== History ==
Regina Elena was built for Pietro Milesi, Genoa. Her first voyage under captain Ameglio was from Genoa to New York and Yokohama, Japan with a consignment of 98,000 boxes of oil, earning Milesi ¢17 per box. From Yokohama she sailed to Port Royal, Jamaica to collect a cargo of lumber which was taken to Antofagasta, Chile where she loaded a cargo of nitrates and departed for Genoa. Her second voyage followed the same route as the first, except that her final destination was Rotterdam, the Netherlands. Regina Elena's third voyage was from Antwerp, Belgium to San Francisco carrying general cargo. In San Francisco, she loaded cereals for Delagoa Bay, Mozambique. A cargo of timber was then taken to Sydney. She then loaded coal at Newcastle, and sailed to Junín, Argentina, the passage taking 35 days. Nitrates were loaded, and Regina Elena sailed to Funchal, Portugal in 89 days, where orders were given to discharge her cargo at Genoa. Her fourth voyage was from Genoa to Barry, Wales where a cargo of coal was loaded for Callao, Peru, which was reached in 104 days. She then sailed to Ballestas where a cargo of guano was loaded. This was taken to Antwerp, the voyage taking 134 days due to hurricane-force winds at Cape Horn.

In 1911, Regina Elena was sold to F. Laeisz, Hamburg for £13,000. She was renamed Ponape. On 20 September 1914, Ponape was arrested by HMS Majestic and escorted into Falmouth. She was declared a war prize and placed under the management of James Bell, Hull by the Admiralty. She was then renamed Bellhouse.

In May 1915, Bellhouse was sold to A/S Bellhouse, Tønsberg, Norway. She was operated under the management of Alf Monsen, Tønsberg. In 1925, Bellhouse was sold to Hugo Lundquist, Mariehamn, Finland and renamed Ponape. She was assigned the Finnish Official Number 778 and the Code Letters TPQS. In 1925, Ponape was carrying a cargo of lumber to Melbourne, Australia when she was caught in a storm to the north west of Iceland and was almost swamped. The voyage to Melbourne took 155 days. She loaded a cargo of grain at Melbourne destined for Europe.

On 31 August 1929, she was sold to Gustav Erikson, Mariehamn for £4,600. She was employed on the wheat trade from Australia. Between 1929 and 1932 the following times are recorded for voyages that Ponape made – Geelong to Falmouth in 89 days; Cardiff to Port Lincoln in 86 days; Port Lincoln to Callao in 50 days; Vlissingen to Port Lincoln in 89 days; Adelaide to Queenstown in 99 days; Copenhagen to Port Lincoln in 106 days; Port Lincoln to Queenstown in 118 days; Lourenço Marques to Port Lincoln in 34 days. Her Code Letters were changed to OHQX in 1934. In September 1936, Ponape was sold to shipbreakers at Libau, Latvia, for £4,600. Her figurehead is preserved at the Ålands Sjöfartsmuseum, Mariehamn.

== Captains ==
The captains of the ship were:-

- Giovanni Ameglio (1903–11)
- Johan August Danielsson (1925–27)
- Arthur Marander (1927–29)
- Erik Uno Eliel Karlsson (1929–32)
- Hugo Donatus Karlsson (1932–33)
- Carl Valfrid Granith (1933–36)
